= Waltham Forest Green Party =

Waltham Forest Green Party, a branch of the Green Party of England and Wales in London

- Governing body: Executive Committee
- Internal Party Coordinator: Sarah Creurer
- Treasurer: Cassie Thomas
- Council Leader: Paul Perkins
- Deputy Council Leader: Eva Tabbasam
- Founded: May 1978
- Preceded by: Waltham Forest Ecology Party; Waltham Forest and Redbridge Green Party
- Membership (November 2025): 1,400+
- Ideology: Green politics
- Political position: Left-wing
- National affiliation: Green Party of England and Wales
- Colours: Green
- Waltham Forest London Borough Council seats: 31 / 60

Website
- walthamforest.greenparty.org.uk

The Waltham Forest Green Party is the local branch of the Green Party of England and Wales operating within the London Borough of Waltham Forest.

In May 2026, the party won overall control of Waltham Forest London Borough Council for the first time, becoming the first Green-controlled council in London.

Paul Perkins and Eva Tabbasam were appointed joint leaders of the Green group of councillors on 14 May 2026, assuming the respective positions of leader and deputy leader of Waltham Forest Council.

== Organisation ==
The Waltham Forest branch of the Ecology Party was founded in May 1978. A separate Redbridge branch of the Ecology Party was meeting independently from at least 1984.

The Ecology Party had renamed itself the Green Party of England and Wales in 1985. The Waltham Forest and Redbridge branches subsequently operated as a combined entity from around 2003, before separating into independent borough-level organisations ahead of the 2022 local elections.

The Waltham Forest Green Party operates through ward-based groups and specialist teams, with elected roles chosen annually by members. Ahead of the 2026 local elections, Rob Gardner served as party co-chair alongside Paul Perkins.

== Electoral history ==
=== Ecology Party years (1978–1985) ===
The Waltham Forest branch of the Ecology Party was founded in May 1978. This is recorded in a branch secretary's report of May 1980, held at the LSE Library as part of the archived papers of former national party chair Jonathon Porritt. By 1980, the London Ecology Party was operating from Walthamstow, with Jean Lambert acting as regional co-ordinator.

==== Role of Steve Lambert ====
Steve Lambert joined the Ecology Party in 1976 and convened the first meeting of the London Ecology Party in October of that year. In November 1986, he wrote a contemporaneous chronology of the London Ecology Party's formation on the occasion of its tenth anniversary. Alongside Jonathon Porritt and Jonathan Tyler, he was elected to the national party's executive committee at its 1977 conference.

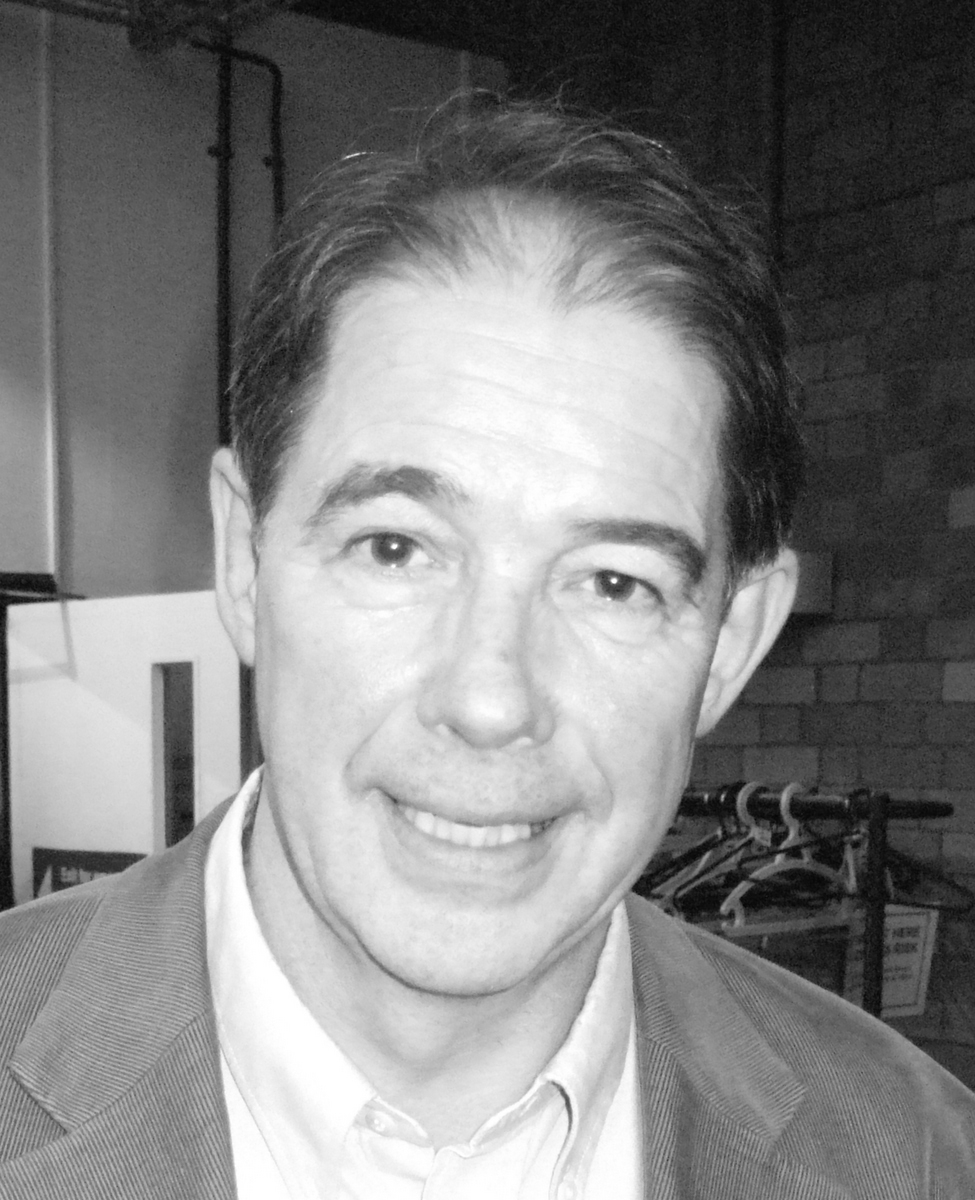
Jonathon Porritt

The Waltham Forest branch's earliest electoral activity came at the local elections in 1978, when Steve Lambert stood in Hoe Street under the banner of the "Save London Alliance" — a coalition of independent and Ecology Party candidates standing across the city — receiving 215 votes (5.6%). His election leaflet, archived at the LSE, set out a platform of conserving natural resources, pollution control, energy self-sufficiency and local democracy. The "Alliance" fielded candidates across the capital, including Jonathon Porritt's candidacy in Hamilton Terrace ward, Westminster.

Steve Lambert went on to stand at the 1979 general election in the Chingford constituency, receiving 649 votes (1.5%). At the 1983 general election in the Walthamstow constituency, he received 424 votes (1.3%).

By the 1982 council elections, the branch had expanded considerably, fielding candidates across the borough, including Chingford Green, Hale End, Hatch Lane, Hoe Street and Larkswood. The London Ecology Party also contested the 1981 Greater London Council election, polling 17,515 votes across 38 seats contested, on a manifesto entitled Green Light for London.

=== Early Green Party years (1986–1989) ===
==== 1986 local elections ====
The Ecology Party changed its name to the Green Party of England and Wales in 1985. The branch contested the 1986 local elections under the Green Party name for the first time, fielding candidates across multiple wards, including Chapel End, Chingford Green, Hale End, Hatch Lane, High Street, Hoe Street, Larkswood, Leyton and Wood Street. Steve Lambert stood again in Hoe Street, receiving 318 votes (7.0%).

==== Role of Jean Lambert ====
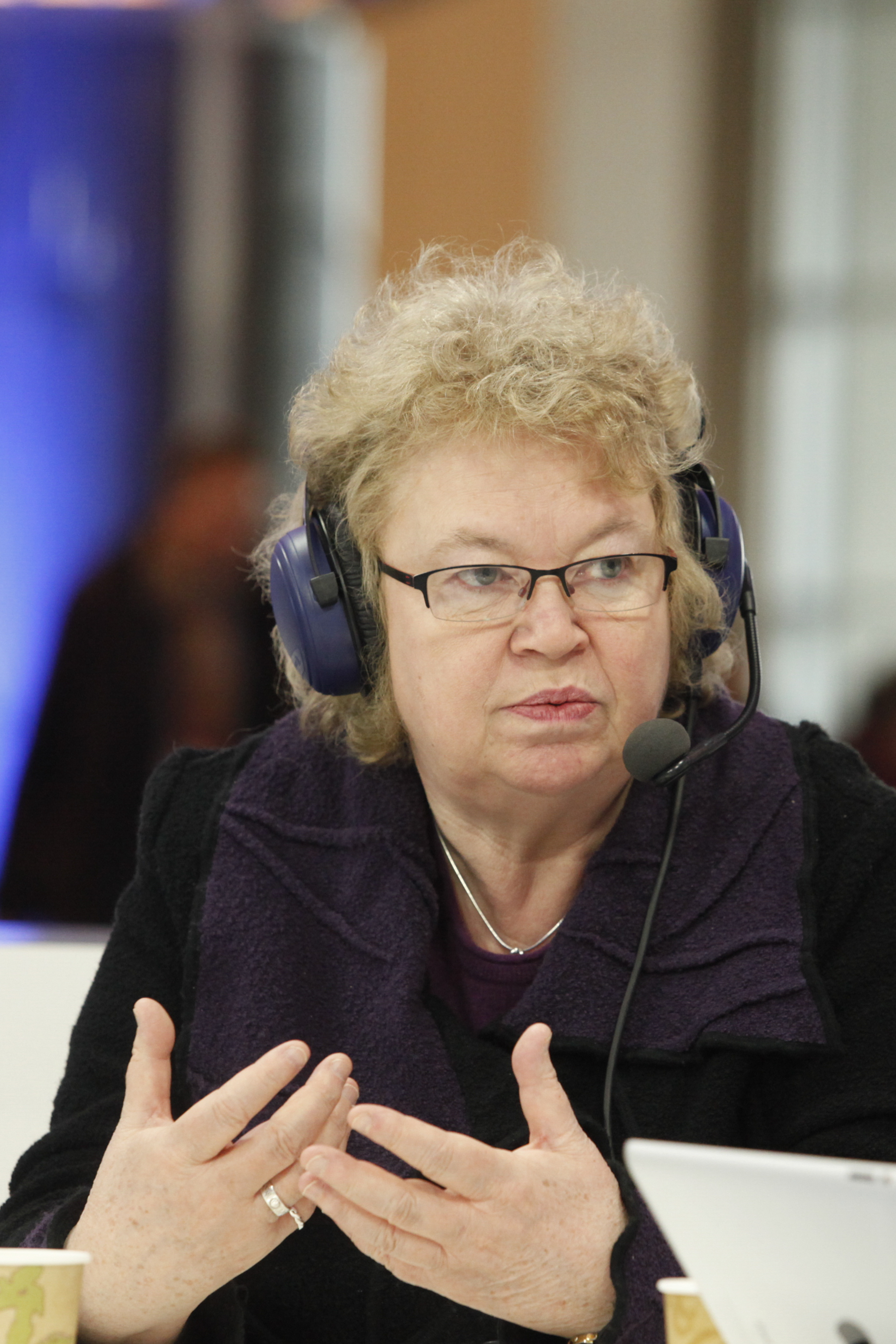
Jean Lambert

A notable figure during this period was Jean Lambert, a teacher in Walthamstow who joined the Ecology Party in 1977. She was secretary of the London Ecology Party in 1977. She later served as co-chair of the Ecology Party from 1982 to 1985 — alongside Jonathon Porritt and Paul Ekins — and later as co-chair of the Green Party from 1986 to 1987.

Jean Lambert also helped establish the London Green Party, contributed to drafting the constitution of the Green Party of England and Wales, and served as chair of the national party executive in 1994. She was the Greens' Principal Speaker in 1992–93 and 1998–99, and was one of the UK's first Green Members of the European Parliament for London in 1999, serving until 2019.

As a Green MEP for London, she engaged in Waltham Forest events and initiatives. Earlier, as the London Ecology Party coordinator, she submitted comments to a Newham report on public awareness of nuclear waste transport through London in 1981, a cause she continued to champion as an MEP, speaking at a demonstration against nuclear waste trains on the North London line in 2010.

=== Green Party activities (1990–2023) ===
For over three decades after its foundation, the Waltham Forest Green Party fielded candidates at both parliamentary and local levels but won no seats on Waltham Forest Council.

==== 1990 council elections ====
At the 1990 local elections, held in the wake of a national Green Party "surge" at the 1989 European election, it fielded candidates across thirteen Waltham Forest wards, receiving 5,377 votes (2.42%) borough-wide — its strongest result to that point.

Steve Lambert stood for in Hoe Street at twelve consecutive elections between 1978 and 2022, with his vote share growing from 5.6% in 1978 to 32.2% in 2022. Despite a steady increase in vote share, England's first-past-the-post voting system consistently prevented the branch from gaining representation. The borough-wide vote share across this period was as follows:

Election	1990	1994	1998	2002	2006	2010	2014	2018	2022
Votes	5,377	2,051	2,408	4,487	8,094	12,133	10,482	10,963	12,396
Vote share	2.42%	1.07%	1.70%	2.89%	4.7%	4.3%	5.6%	5.5%	7.5%
Seats	0	0	0	0	0	0	0	0	0

The party experienced a growth in membership during this period. In February 2015, the East London and West Essex Guardian reported that its membership had risen by 354% since January 2014, reflecting a broader rise in national Green Party membership ahead of the 2015 general election. The Waltham Forest branch increase was part of a broader phenomenon, as between October 2014 and May 2015, the Green Party's membership across England and Wales increased from under 20,000 to over 60,000 in a period described as the "Green surge".

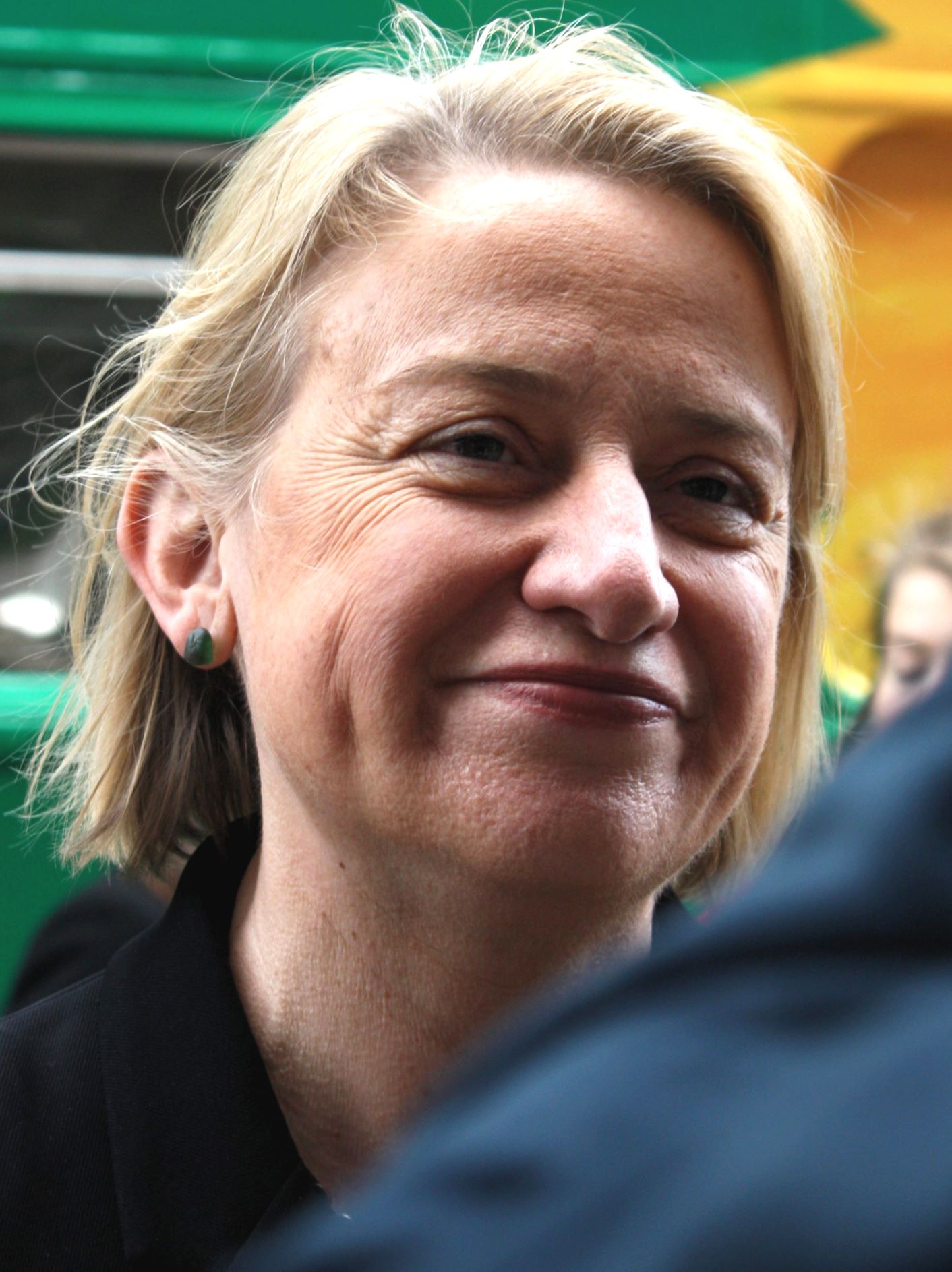
Natalie Bennett, Green Party leader (2012-16)

==== RoseMary Warrington ====
A long-standing figure in the Waltham Forest party was RoseMary Warrington, a local resident who joined the Green Party in 2009 and stood as a candidate in Waltham Forest Council elections from 2010 onwards. She was an officer of the branch from 2011 and of the London Green Party from 2012. Warrington was later elected to represent Leytonstone in the 2026 council elections, receiving 1,707 votes.

==== Melanie Strickland ====
Another borough resident associated with the branch was Melanie Strickland, one of the Stansted 15; a group of fifteen activists who, in March 2017, peacefully blocked a deportation flight at Stansted Airport. The group was convicted under the Aviation and Maritime Security Act 1990, and their convictions were quashed by the Court of Appeal in February 2021. Strickland's membership of the Waltham Forest Greens was noted in a letter published in The Guardian in October 2018.

=== 2022 local elections ===
Results of the 2022 Waltham Forest Council election

At the 2022 local elections, the branch received 7.5% of the borough-wide vote (12,396 votes) but returned no councillors, while the Labour Party won 47 of 60 seats with 59.2% of the vote. Rachel Barrat received 1,132 votes (42.0%) in St James ward and Charlotte Lafferty received 557 votes (19.3%) in Leytonstone ward. The strongest performances were concentrated in inner wards such as St James, Leytonstone and William Morris, where Green candidates achieved double-digit vote shares despite no councillors being elected.

=== 2024 general election ===
The 2024 general election marked a significant shift in the branch's electoral profile across the borough. In the Walthamstow constituency, Rosie Rowlands came second with 9,176 votes (20.0%), a swing of +16.4 percentage points — the branch's strongest parliamentary result in the borough to that date. In the Leyton and Wanstead constituency, Charlotte Lafferty also came second with 6,791 votes (15.5%), a swing of +11.7 percentage points. The results reflected an increase in Green support across the borough, with the party overtaking the Conservatives in both Walthamstow and Leyton and Wanstead.

The three Waltham Forest constituencies were won by Stella Creasy (Labour/Co-op, Walthamstow), Calvin Bailey (Labour, Leyton and Wanstead) and Iain Duncan Smith (Conservative, Chingford and Woodford Green). The branch did not contest the marginal constituency of Chingford and Woodford Green in 2024 in an attempt to help defeat Duncan Smith.

=== Activities between 2024–26 ===
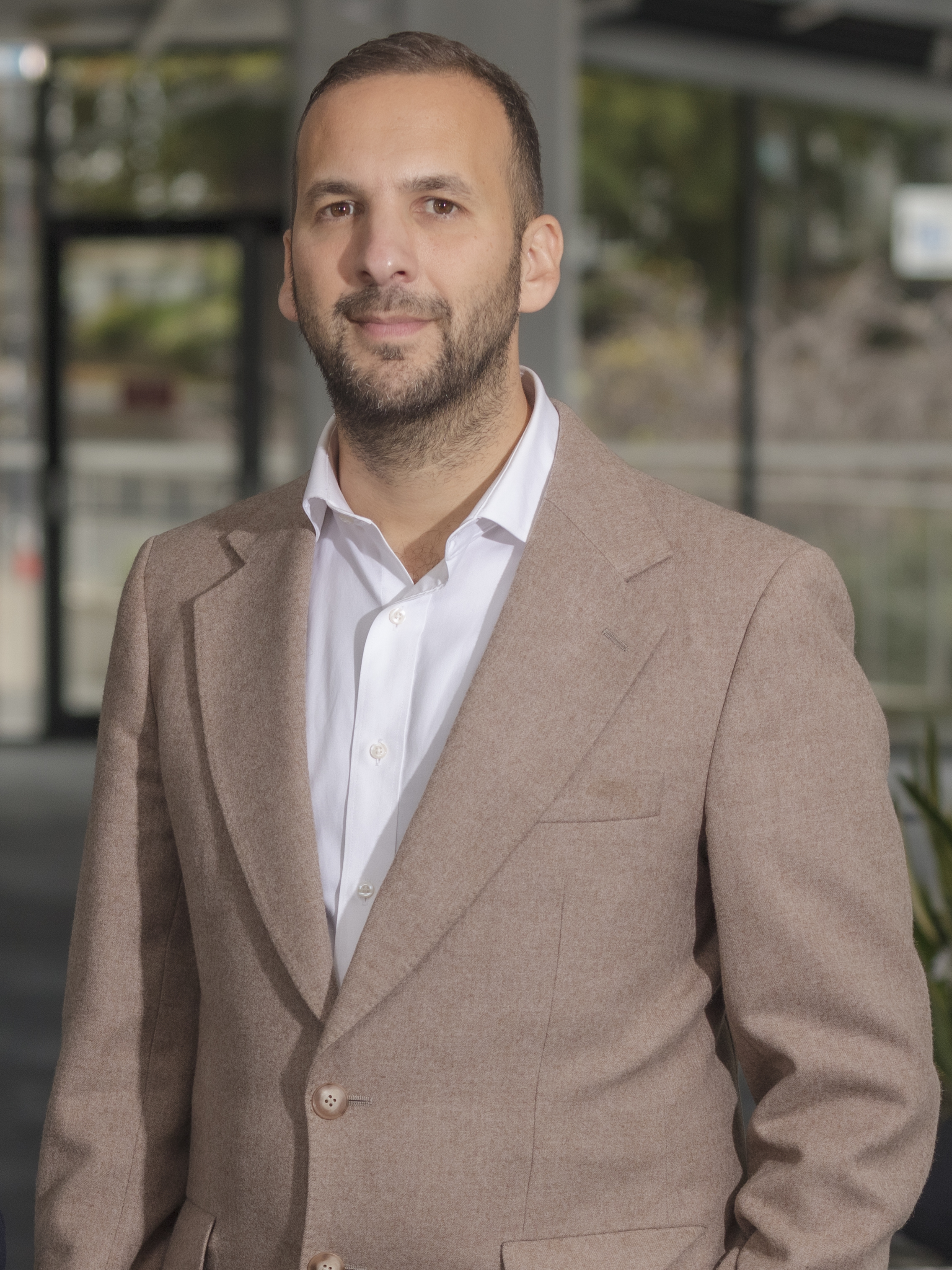
Zack Polanski

Following the 2024 general election, the branch underwent a period of organisational change. Membership increased from 630 in September 2025 to over 1,400 by late October — a 122% increase in under two months — driven in part by dissatisfaction with the Labour government and the popularity of new national party leader Zack Polanski. The branch established a campaigning team in the borough for the first time, with members conducting door-knocking and leafleting across wards where it had previously run minimal campaigns.

Candidates including Solène Fabios, who had stood independently in Lea Bridge in 2022, joined the branch ahead of the 2026 elections. In the 2022 local elections, Green candidates had finished second behind Labour in twelve of the borough's twenty-two wards — seven of them in Walthamstow — providing the organisational foundation for a borough-wide challenge in 2026.

== 2026 local elections ==
Graph of all opinion polls conducted ahead of the next UK general election using LOESS lines

The Waltham Forest Greens' 2026 campaign took place against a backdrop of sharply rising Green Party support nationally under Zack Polanski, who had been elected party leader in September 2025 — and under whose leadership national membership tripled to over 200,000 by March 2026 — with the Greens overtaking both Labour and the Conservatives in national polls for the first time in March 2026. Locally, the campaign was shaped by significant Labour vulnerability following the council's emergency £19 million government loan and a substantial increase in membership.

=== Campaign ===
Ahead of the 7 May 2026 local elections, the Waltham Forest Greens published a manifesto entitled Hope and a Plan for Waltham Forest. According to contemporaneous reporting, the manifesto centred on three broad commitments: open and accountable governance, community-led decision-making, and investment in local services. Proposed policies included measures on affordable housing, a dedicated renters' support service, reform of adult social care, street cleaning and road maintenance, youth sports and arts provision, guaranteed resident access to green space, and publication of a divestment roadmap for the council's pension fund.

Candidates were fielded in all wards except Larkswood and Valley, where the Greens stood aside in support of the Chingford and Woodford Green Community Independents — a group backed by Faiza Shaheen, the former Labour politician who had been controversially deselected as the Labour candidate for Chingford and Woodford Green ahead of the 2024 general election. The group fielded six candidates across Larkswood and Valley but did not win any seats.

Ahead of the election, a YouGov poll commissioned by Sky News projected the Green Party would win the largest share of votes in Waltham Forest, ending sixteen years of Labour control of the council — a finding Labour dismissed as "speculative". The same poll projected further Green gains in Hackney, Lewisham and Lambeth.

=== Election results ===
Map of the 2026 Waltham Forest Borough Council election results

Elections took place on 7 May 2026 across all 22 wards of Waltham Forest, with 60 councillors elected in total across six two-member and sixteen three-member wards. Official results recorded a turnout of 42.08%.

2026 Waltham Forest Council election results
Party	Seats	Change	Votes	Vote %	Swing	
	Green	31	▲31	81,553	37.2%	▲ +29.7%
	Labour	15	▼32	71,284	32.6%	▼ −26.6%
	Conservative	14	▲1	34,121	15.6%	▼ −6.6%
	Reform UK	0	—	14,165	6.5%	▲ +6.3%
	Liberal Democrats	0	—	9,322	4.3%	▼ −3.1%

=== Election count ===
The first Green victory of the count came in Cathall, where Rachel Barrat claimed the party's first-ever seat on Waltham Forest Council, receiving 872 votes. Shortly after, Chanté Johnson won in Markhouse. In Lea Bridge, the Green Party won all three seats, ending Labour's representation in the ward. Further full-slate Green wins followed in St James, High Street, Cann Hall, Forest, Grove Green, Chapel End and Leyton. The Green majority was confirmed with the declaration of Higham Hill.

Labour retained seats in Hoe Street, William Morris, Upper Walthamstow, Wood Street, Hale End and Highams Park South, plus three seats across Leytonstone, Markhouse and Higham Hill wards, finishing on 15 councillors. The Conservatives held Chingford Green, Endlebury, Hatch Lane and Highams Park North, Larkswood and Valley, gaining one seat to finish on 14 councillors. Reform UK contested multiple wards but won none. The Liberal Democrats failed to win a seat, having lost all representation at the 2014 elections.

=== Reaction ===
Waltham Forest Council elections results, 8 May 2026

Following the declaration of results, Rob Gardner, elected to represent Leyton and local party co-chair, said that the outcome demonstrated significant demand for political change in Waltham Forest after decades of Labour control, and described the party's advance from no councillors to overall control as "phenomenal".

The Green Party leader Zack Polanski said that the results signalled the end of two-party politics, arguing that "the new politics is the Green Party versus Reform".

Sadiq Khan, the Labour Mayor of London, stated that he would work collaboratively with the borough's council leaders across all political parties to serve London residents. Kizzy Gardiner, the new leader of Labour group on the council following the 2026 elections, stated that Labour would "work with the new administration in the best interests of all residents" while continuing to hold the Greens to account.

== Elected Green councillors (May 2026) ==
The following Green Party candidates were elected to Waltham Forest Council on 7 May 2026.

Green Party councillors elected in Waltham Forest May 2026
Ward	Councillor	Votes
Cann Hall	Tom Hainge	1,951
Cann Hall	Peter Richardson	1,900
Cann Hall	Eva Tabbasam	1,970
Cathall	Rachel Barrat	872
Chapel End	Luke Glazzard	1,744
Chapel End	Layla Rosa	1,808
Chapel End	Sue Wheat	1,784
Forest	Yuksel Gonul	2,337
Forest	Simone McNichols-Thomas	2,401
Forest	Paul Perkins	2,332
Grove Green	Sarah Bentley	2,231
Grove Green	Charlotte Lafferty	2,030
Grove Green	Paul Treacy	1,828
High Street	Lisa Bryan	1,882
High Street	John Donegan	1,759
High Street	Marcelo Hart-Camus	1,708
Higham Hill	Louise Ashcroft	1,486
Higham Hill	Em Dean	1,251
Lea Bridge	Liz Biggs	2,443
Lea Bridge	Solène Fabios	2,325
Lea Bridge	Rosie Rowlands	2,303
Leyton	Rob Gardner	1,799
Leyton	Daisy Richards	1,822
Leyton	Demetrius Williams	1,657
Leytonstone	Denise Alder	1,767
Leytonstone	RoseMary Warrington	1,707
Markhouse	Chanté Johnson	1,170
St James	David Berrie	2,169
St James	Martin Edobor	2,144
St James	Anna Rose Kerr	2,194
William Morris	Ben Copsey	1,847

Several Waltham Forest Green Party candidates narrowly missed election. As shown in the table below, the closest defeat came in William Morris — just 17 votes behind the last elected candidate — while the widest margin among the near-misses was 59 votes in Markhouse.

Waltham Forest Green Party near-misses
Ward	Green candidate	Green votes	Last elected candidate	Elected candidate votes	Margin
William Morris	Robyn Page	1,786	Jack Phipps (Labour)	1,803	17
Wood Street	Charlie Loveday	1,249	Stephanie Talbut (Labour)	1,270	21
Higham Hill	Marco Hacon	1,148	Kira Lewis (Labour)	1,170	22
Hoe Street	Laura Pearce	1,729	Ahsan Khan (Labour)	1,783	54
Markhouse	Richard Wild	1,100	Sharon Waldron (Labour)	1,159	59

== Leadership ==
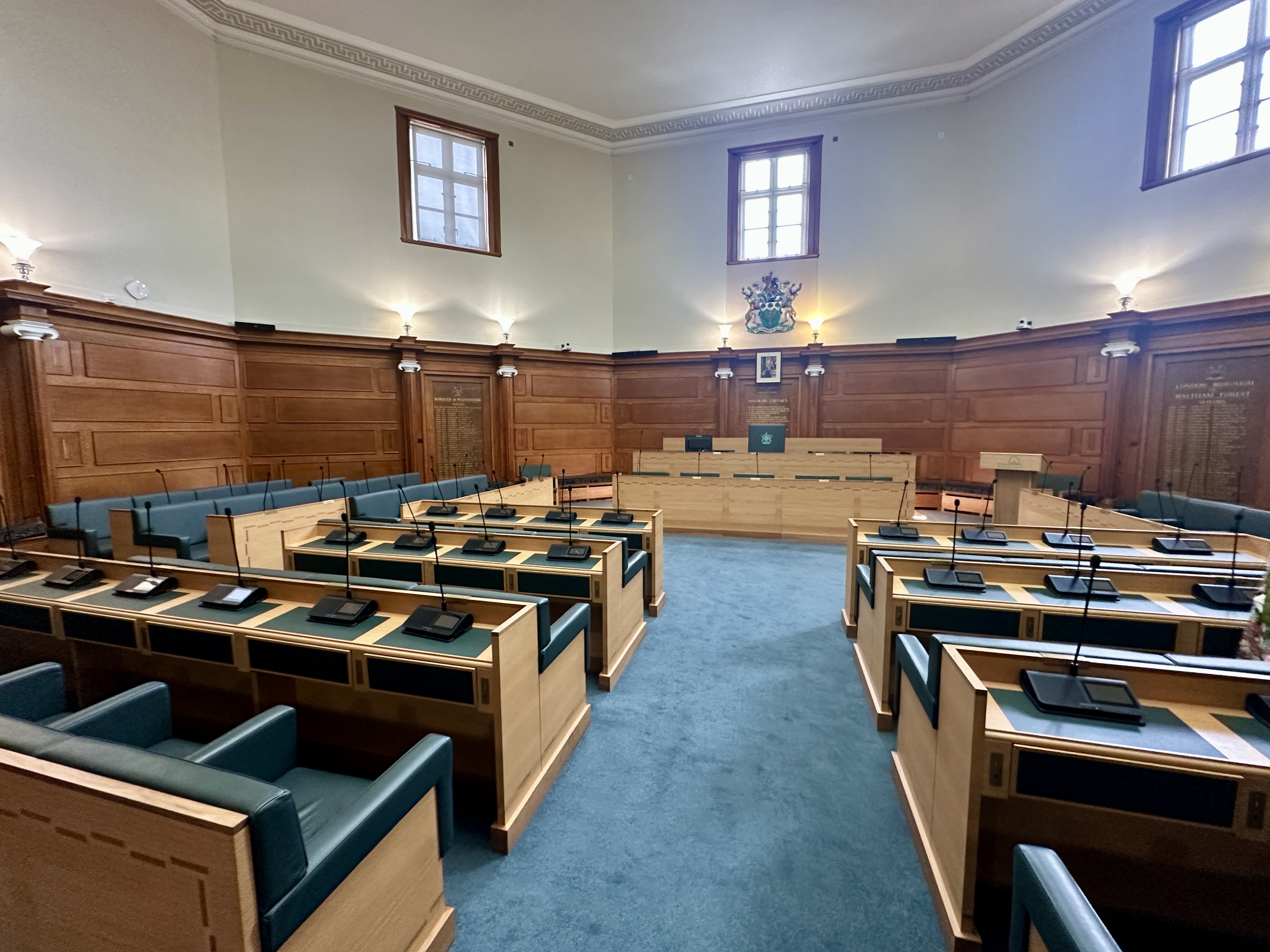
Waltham Forest Council town hall chamber

Following the election, the 31 Green councillors selected Paul Perkins and Eva Tabbasam as joint leaders of the Green group via secret ballot on 14 May 2026.

As the council's constitution requires a single council leader, the two adopted a rotating leadership model, described at the time as uncommon in local government. Under the arrangement, Perkins serves as council leader with Tabbasam as deputy leader from May 2026 to May 2027, at which point the roles are scheduled to switch for the May 2027 to May 2028 term. Perkins was elected in Forest and Tabbasam was elected in Cann Hall.

== Significance of 2026 victory ==
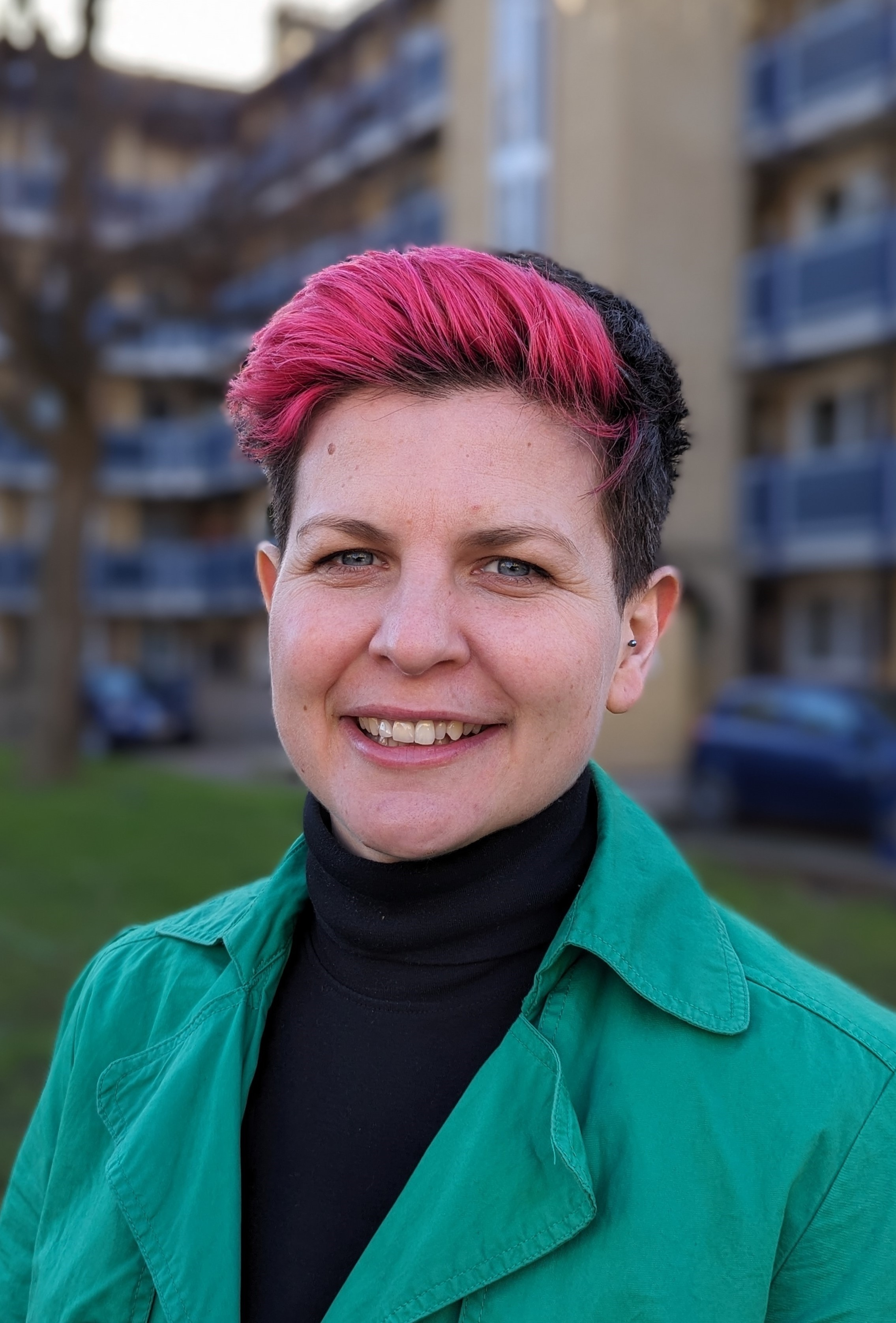
Zoë Garbett

The 2026 result made Waltham Forest the first Green-controlled council in London and only the second Green-majority council in the history of the UK, following Mid Suffolk District Council in 2023.

The result ended a near-unbroken period of Labour dominance in the borough dating to the council's foundation in 1965, interrupted only by the 1968 elections in which the Conservatives won 44 of 60 seats — a surge driven by national anti-Labour sentiment — before Labour reclaimed control at subsequent elections.

By May 2026, the Green Party held councillors in 22 of the 32 London boroughs, with 288 Green councillors across the capital. Alongside Waltham Forest, Greens controlled Hackney (40 seats) and Lewisham (39 seats) outright, and was the largest party without overall control in Haringey and Lambeth (27 seats each). At the same elections, the Greens' Zoë Garbett was elected as Mayor of Hackney and Liam Shrivastava as Mayor of Lewisham.

London Councils 2026: Green Party successes
Council	Control	Lab	Con	Lib Dem	Green	Reform	Other	Vacant	Total
Hackney	GRN Mayor	9	6	0	40	0	0	2	57
Lewisham	GRN Mayor	14	0	0	39	0	0	1	54
Waltham Forest	GRN	15	14	0	31	0	0	0	60
Lambeth	LAB	26	0	8	27	0	0	2	63
Haringey	LAB	21	0	8	27	0	0	1	57
Southwark	LAB	29	0	12	22	0	0	0	63

Zack Polanski is a former resident of Walthamstow and has publicly stated his intention to stand as a parliamentary candidate in a North London constituency — naming Walthamstow as one possibility — at the next UK general election.

== Green Administration (2026—) ==
=== Early priorities ===
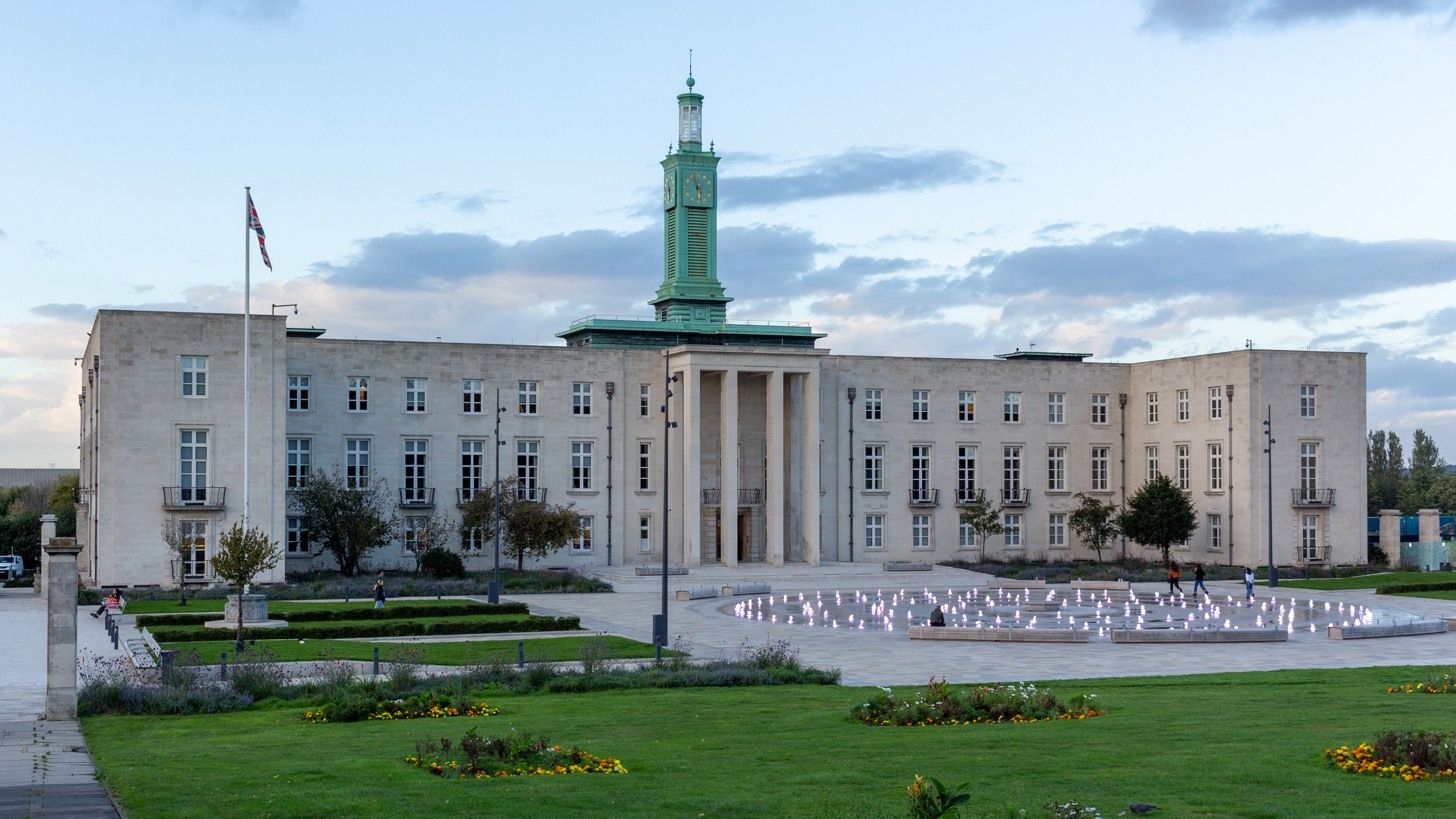
Waltham Forest Town Hall

The new Green administration identified the council's finances as its immediate priority. A spokesperson stated that "council finances are a huge concern" and that the administration was conducting a "thorough review" of the council's records, to which it had not previously had access as an opposition group.

The council's largest financial pressures were temporary accommodation and social care, which together accounted for approximately 70% of spending — both statutory services the council is legally required to provide. The administration stated that residents would have "a greater say in plans that affect their neighbourhoods" and that decisions would be "rooted in community participation".

The administration also announced plans to publish a divestment roadmap for the council's pension fund investments, a policy shared with the newly Green-controlled Hackney Council.

In a statement following his appointment, Paul Perkins announced plans to establish a "Commission for the Future" to bring the voices of young people, community organisations and local businesses into the council's decision-making.

=== Annual meeting of the Council (May 2026) ===
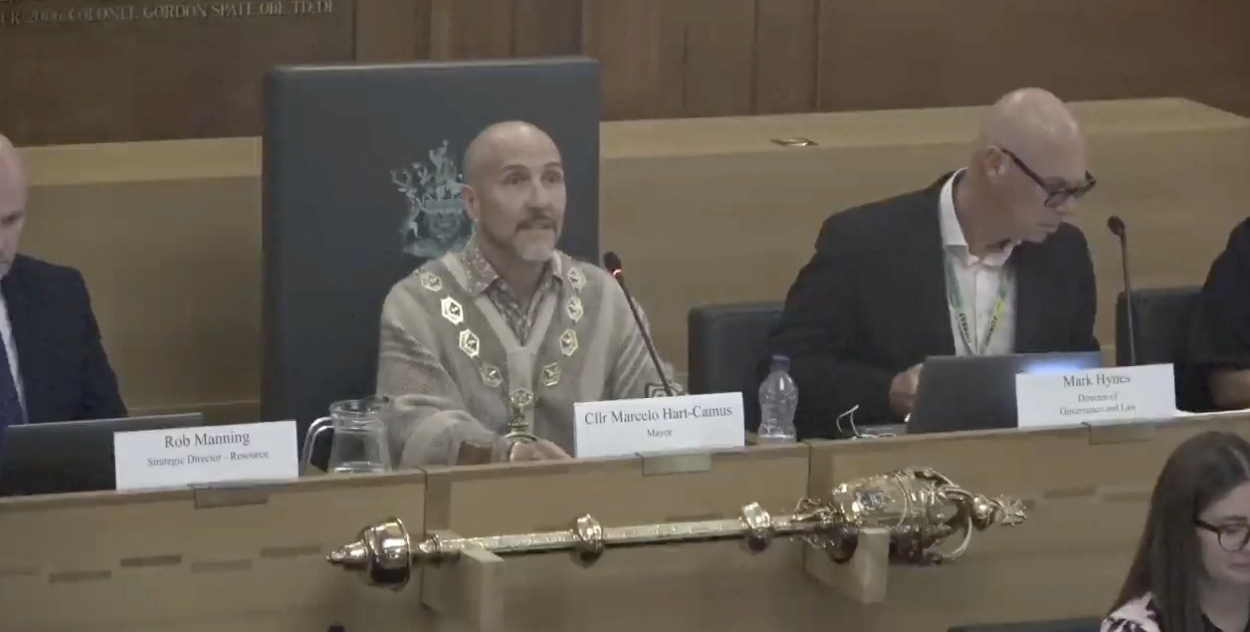
Marcelo Hart-Camus at his swearing-in as Mayor of Waltham Forest, 21 May 2026

At the first annual meeting of the new administration, held in the Town Hall on 21 May 2026, Marcelo Hart-Camus (High Street) was elected Mayor of the London Borough of Waltham Forest for 2026–27, succeeding Tony Bell. Hart-Camus wore a poncho during his swearing-in ceremony as a visual acknowledgement of his Latin American heritage.

Paul Perkins was formally appointed leader of the council, with Rob Gardner confirmed as Green group coordinator. Perkins announced the membership of his cabinet, with Eva Tabbasam serving as deputy leader alongside her housing and regeneration portfolio.

=== Inaugural Green Cabinet (2026–27) ===
The cabinet's portfolios reflect Green priorities, with dedicated responsibilities for flood resilience, biodiversity and fly-tipping (Sarah Bentley), violence against women and girls (Charlotte Lafferty), digital inclusion and poverty reduction (Paul Treacy), and Whipps Cross Hospital development (Martin Edobor) sitting alongside the core machinery of housing, finance and children's services.

Portfolio	Cabinet member
Leader	Paul Perkins
Deputy Leader; Housing and Regeneration	Eva Tabbasam
Climate and Air Quality	Sarah Bentley
Inclusive Economy	Chanté Johnson
Finance and Resources	Em Dean
Community Safety	Charlotte Lafferty
Children and Young People	Daisy Richards
Adults and Health	Martin Edobor
Communities and Libraries	Paul Treacy
Culture, Sports and Communications	Anna Rose Kerr

Committee seats were allocated in proportion to the council's political composition. The chairmanship of the audit and governance committee was allocated to Conservative group leader Emma Best; and the children and families and the health and adult social care scrutiny committees were allocated to Labour councillors Yusuf Patel and Karen Bellamy respectively.

== Executive Committee (2026–) ==
Following an EGM in July 2026, the party elected a new executive committee – appointing Sarah Creurer (Internal Party Coordinator), Cassie Thomas (Treasurer and Electoral Agent), Robyn Page (Membership Coordinator), Daisy Sands (Policy & Scrutiny), Jake Smith (Fundraising Coordinator), Jamie Woolley (Communications Coordinator) – and constituency coordinators Rory Fitzgerald (Walthamstow), Saqeed Howlader (Chingford) and Lesley Perkins (Wanstead & Leyton).

== See also ==
- London Borough of Waltham Forest
- Waltham Forest London Borough Council
- 2026 Waltham Forest London Borough Council election
- Waltham Forest London Borough Council elections
- Green Party of England and Wales
- Ecology Party
- Jean Lambert (politician)
- Walthamstow (UK Parliament constituency)
- Leyton and Wanstead (UK Parliament constituency)
- Chingford and Woodford Green (UK Parliament constituency)
