= 1998 Waltham Forest London Borough Council election =

1998 local election in England

- 7 May 1998

57 seats up for election to Waltham Forest London Borough Council 29 seats needed for a majority
- Registered: 156,186
- Turnout: 53,404, 34.19% (▼10.46)

	First party	Second party	Third party
Leader	Huw Morgan-Thomas	Unknown	Unknown
Party	Labour	Conservative	Liberal Democrats
Leader since	1994	Unknown	Unknown
Leader's seat	Leytonstone	Unknown	Unknown
Last election	27 seats, 42.83%	16 seats, 23.34%	14 seats, 31.99%
Seats before	28	16	13
Seats won	30	15	12
Seat change	▲2	▼1	▼1
Popular vote	60,808	32,979	44,195
Percentage	43.08%	23.36%	31.31%
Swing	▼4.29	▼4.71	▼0.68
Council control before election
No Overall Control
Council control after election
Labour

The 1998 Election to Waltham Forest Council, a borough in London. England was held in May 1998. The whole council was up for election for the first time since the 1994 election.

Waltham Forest local elections are held every four years, with the next due and held in 2002. The Labour Party won majority control of the council.

== Background ==
In the 4 years from the 1994 election until this election there was 1 by-election to replace a councillor who resigned from his seat, one which resulted in Labour gaining a seat from the Liberal Democrats. In addition to this 3 Labour councillors defected to other parties, 1 to the Liberal Democrats and 2 more to third parties. These changes meant that just before the election the composition of the council was as follows:

↓
24	14	16	2	1
Labour	Lib Dem	Conservative	Other	Vacant

== Election result ==
Waltham Forest local election result 1998
Party	Seats	Gains	Losses	Net gain/loss	Seats %	Votes %	Votes	+/−
Labour	30	3	1	▲2	52.63	43.08	60,808	▼4.29
Conservative	15	0	1	▼1	26.32	23.36	32,979	▼4.71
Liberal Democrats	12	1	2	▼1	21.05	31.31	44,195	▼0.68
Green	0	0	0	Steady	0.00	1.70	2,408	▲0.63
Ind. Residents	0	0	0	Steady	0.00	0.19	267	New
BNP	0	0	0	Steady	0.00	0.14	197	New
Independent	0	0	0	Steady	0.00	0.12	171	▼0.43
Socialist (GB)	0	0	0	Steady	0.00	0.10	135	New
Total	57						141,160	

After the election the composition of the council was as follows:

↓
30	12	15
Labour	Lib Dem	Conservative

== Ward results ==
(*) - Indicates an incumbent candidate

(†) - Indicates an incumbent candidate standing in a different ward

=== Cann Hall ===
Cann Hall (3)
Party	Candidate	Votes	%	±%
Liberal Democrats	Clyde Kitson*	1,741	64.26	▲10.37
Liberal Democrats	Keith Rayner*	1,652		
Liberal Democrats	Elizabeth Phillips*	1,651		
Labour	Jahungir Khan	855	31.81	▼9.02
Labour	Ian Leslie	847		
Labour	John Walsh	795		
Conservative	Mary Neilson-Hansen	114	3.93	▼1.35
Conservative	Adrian Fannon	98		
Conservative	David Hemsted	96		
Registered electors		7,538		▼287
Turnout		2,847	37.77	▼12.13
Rejected ballots		18	0.63	▲0.55
Liberal Democrats hold				
Liberal Democrats hold				
Liberal Democrats hold				

=== Cathall ===
Cathall (3)
Party	Candidate	Votes	%	±%
Labour	Milton Martin	1,143	62.17	▼3.49
Labour	Shameem Highfield	1,086		
Labour	Terence Wheeler*	1,071		
Liberal Democrats	Abdul Mian	321	17.46	▲1.70
Liberal Democrats	Mark Southall	318		
Liberal Democrats	Angela Wait	288		
Green	Stephen Clough	193	10.91	New
Conservative	Roger Hemsted	175	9.46	▼0.98
Conservative	Margery Williams	165		
Conservative	Edward Robinson	162		
Registered electors		7,412		▼754
Turnout		1,818	24.53	▼12.13
Rejected ballots		10	0.55	▲0.25
Labour hold				
Labour hold				
Labour hold				

=== Chapel End ===
Chapel End (3)
Party	Candidate	Votes	%	±%
Liberal Democrats	Patricia Atherton*	1,402	47.68	▼4.73
Liberal Democrats	Robert Belam*	1,395		
Liberal Democrats	Graham Woolnough*	1,354		
Labour	Jack Kaye	949	30.14	▲4.01
Labour	Richard Sweden	855		
Labour	Mahesh Laheru	820		
Conservative	Christopher McMurray	504	18.21	▲1.86
Conservative	Eric Edis	502		
Conservative	Richard McCauley	502		
BNP	Alan Gould	141	5.11	New
Registered electors		7,825		▼92
Turnout		3,003	38.38	▼11.80
Rejected ballots		15	0.50	▲0.42
Liberal Democrats hold				
Liberal Democrats hold				
Liberal Democrats hold				

=== Chingford Green ===
Chingford Green (3)
Party	Candidate	Votes	%	±%
Conservative	Michael Fish*	1,846	58.20	▲8.18
Conservative	Derek Arnold*	1,815		
Conservative	Michael Lewis*	1,721		
Liberal Democrats	Henry Boyle	719	21.56	▼7.48
Liberal Democrats	Ian Paterson	677		
Labour	Elizabeth Lee	663	20.23	▲1.80
Labour	Richard Davies	618		
Liberal Democrats	Christopher Mullington	598		
Labour	Rita O'Reilly	590		
Registered electors		8,934		▼103
Turnout		3,295	36.88	▲10.87
Rejected ballots		11	0.33	▲0.26
Conservative hold				
Conservative hold				
Conservative hold				

=== Endlebury ===
Endlebury (2)
Party	Candidate	Votes	%	±%
Conservative	Peter Herrington	1,311	62.26	▲4.62
Conservative	Mladen Jovcic*	1,271		
Labour	Stephen Pierpoint	403	17.43	▼1.95
Liberal Democrats	Kathleen Mudie	325	14.76	▼8.22
Labour	Krit Serai	320		
Liberal Democrats	Monica Phemister	287		
Green	Joan Allen	115	5.55	New
Registered electors		6,269		▲15
Turnout		2,185	34.85	▼9.49
Rejected ballots		9	0.41	▲0.16
Conservative hold				
Conservative hold				

=== Forest ===
Forest (3)
Party	Candidate	Votes	%	±%
Labour	Mohammed Rahman*	1,691	53.95	▲6.09
Labour	Kabal Dhillon*	1,479		
Labour	Simon Tucker	1,453		
Liberal Democrats	Mohammed Shafiq	1,078	36.96	▼7.97
Liberal Democrats	Patrick Smith	1,066		
Liberal Democrats	Peter Strachan	1,023		
Conservative	Thomas Kelly	285	9.09	▲1.88
Conservative	David Evans	268		
Conservative	Nicholas Purkis	226		
Registered electors		7,752		▼151
Turnout		3,025	39.02	▼11.53
Rejected ballots		35	1.16	▲0.89
Labour hold				
Labour hold				
Labour hold				

=== Grove Green ===
Grove Green (3)
Party	Candidate	Votes	%	±%
Labour	Tarsem Bhogal*	1,203	47.89	▼7.21
Labour	Jane Duran	1,133		
Labour	Andrew Lock*	1,108		
Liberal Democrats	Nazir Butt	821	32.30	▲6.30
Liberal Democrats	Mohamed Bagas	772		
Liberal Democrats	Jeniffer Sullivan	730		
Green	William Measure	277	11.56	▲3.37
Conservative	Rosemary Holman	226	8.25	▼2.46
Conservative	Barbara Martin	193		
Conservative	Pamela Jovcic	173		
Registered electors		7,782		▼209
Turnout		2,439	31.34	▼11.31
Rejected ballots		31	1.27	▲1.09
Labour hold				
Labour hold				
Labour hold				

=== Hale End ===
Hale End (2)
Party	Candidate	Votes	%	±%
Conservative	Douglas Norman*	850	37.18	▼0.14
Conservative	Lesley Finlayson*	833		
Liberal Democrats	Joan Carder	723	31.92	▲1.34
Liberal Democrats	John Beanse	722		
Labour	Martin Dore	597	26.09	▲1.39
Labour	Jennifer Williams^{†} (Note: Williams was a sitting councillor representing the High Street ward)	584		
Green	Michael Farrell	109	4.82	▼2.58
Registered electors		5,487		▲131
Turnout		2,336	42.57	▼10.94
Rejected ballots		8	0.34	▲0.27
Conservative hold				
Conservative hold				

=== Hatch Lane ===
Hatch Lane (3)
Party	Candidate	Votes	%	±%
Conservative	Geoffrey Walker*	1,297	43.73	▼4.68
Conservative	Marion Fitzgerald	1,287		
Conservative	Laurie Braham*	1,232		
Labour	Stewart Blackledge	1,121	37.06	▲8.13
Labour	David Hayes	1,072		
Labour	Gerard Lyons	1,041		
Liberal Democrats	Frank Brown	371	11.79	▼10.87
Liberal Democrats	Janet Hoskins	341		
Liberal Democrats	John Smith-Pryor	317		
Green	Robert Tatam	216	7.43	New
Registered electors		8,253		▼38
Turnout		2,946	35.70	▼8.70
Rejected ballots		13	0.44	▲0.25
Conservative hold				
Conservative hold				
Conservative hold				

=== High Street ===
High Street (3)
Party	Candidate	Votes	%	±%
Labour	Liaquat Ali*	1,402	47.68	▼6.34
Labour	David Blunt	1,351		
Liberal Democrats	Robert Wheatley^{†} (Note: Wheatley was a sitting councillor representing the Higham Hill ward)	1,321	42.91	▲12.45
Labour	Aktar Beg*	1,199		
Liberal Democrats	Mohammad Diwan	1,144		
Liberal Democrats	Franklyn Georges	1.091		
Conservative	Fiona Buchanan	288	9.41	▼6.12
Conservative	Robert Brock	267		
Conservative	Riaz Butt	225		
Registered electors		7,974		▼124
Turnout		3,086	38.70	▼6.08
Rejected ballots		22	0.71	▲0.49
Labour hold				
Labour hold				
Liberal Democrats gain from Labour				

=== Higham Hill ===
Higham Hill (2)
Party	Candidate	Votes	%	±%
Liberal Democrats	Robert Carey*	781	44.70	▼22.06
Liberal Democrats	Peter Woolcott	679		
Labour	Peter Barnett	599	35.15	▲9.98
Labour	Karen Dunphie	549		
Ind. Residents	David Bracegirdle	152	8.18	New
Conservative	Douglas Buchanan	149	8.54	▲0.43
Conservative	Philip Hallsworth	130		
Ind. Residents	Reginald Reed	115		
BNP	Terence Cooper	56	3.43	New
Registered electors		4,882		▼156
Turnout		1,756	35.97	▼14.59
Rejected ballots		5	0.28	▲0.08
Liberal Democrats hold				
Liberal Democrats hold				

=== Hoe Street ===
Hoe Street (3)
Party	Candidate	Votes	%	±%
Labour	Sylvia Poulsen*	1,504	51.33	▼1.18
Labour	Eric Sizer*	1,461		
Labour	Mohammed Nasim*	1,328		
Conservative	Jenny Buzzard	501	17.14	▼3.18
Conservative	Paul Buzzard	497		
Liberal Democrats	Patricia Wardell	483	14.28	▼1.02
Green	Stephen Lambert	481	17.25	▲5.38
Conservative	Khan Mehboob	435		
Liberal Democrats	Mohammed Aslam	366		
Liberal Democrats	Liaquat Ali	345		
Registered electors		9,001		▼245
Turnout		2,803	31.14	▼12.87
Rejected ballots		21	0.75	▲0.50
Labour hold				
Labour hold				
Labour hold				

=== Larkswood ===
Larkswood (3)
Party	Candidate	Votes	%	±%
Conservative	John Walter*	1,482	51.71	▲0.46
Conservative	Michael Thompson*	1,445		
Conservative	Eric Williams*	1,400		
Labour	Carolyn Brown	949	33.28	▲4.94
Labour	David Evans	930		
Labour	Patricia Evans	906		
Liberal Democrats	Violet Wells	445	15.01	▼5.40
Liberal Democrats	Geraldine McElarney	409		
Liberal Democrats	Keith Wanden	402		
Registered electors		10,086		▲245
Turnout		3,048	30.22	▼12.60
Rejected ballots		12	0.39	▲0.08
Conservative hold				
Conservative hold				
Conservative hold				

=== Lea Bridge ===
Lea Bridge (3)
Party	Candidate	Votes	%	±%
Labour	Anthony Buckley*	1,226	54.63	▼8.23
Labour	Sarah Buckley*	1,206		
Labour	Roberto Bruni	1,062		
Liberal Democrats	Mehor Khan	628	28.33	▲12.87
Liberal Democrats	Kay-Lorraine Andrews	607		
Liberal Democrats	Mashoodul Qureshi	577		
Conservative	Barbara Strank	377	17.04	▼1.41
Conservative	Susan Webb	362		
Conservative	John Strank	351		
Registered electors		7,818		▼323
Turnout		2,410	30.83	▼7.00
Rejected ballots		20	0.83	▲0.51
Labour hold				
Labour hold				
Labour hold				

=== Leyton ===
Leyton (3)
Party	Candidate	Votes	%	±%
Liberal Democrats	Robert Sullivan*	1,636	49.60	▼3.03
Liberal Democrats	Loretta Hodges*	1,615		
Liberal Democrats	Charles Tuckey*	1,549		
Labour	Christopher Robbins	1,306	39.58	▼7.78
Labour	Paul Redcliffe^{†} (Note: Redcliffe was a sitting councillor representing the Grove Green ward)	1,272		
Labour	Clive Morton	1,253		
Socialist (GB)	Louise Thompson	135	4.18	New
Green	David Smith	117	3.63	New
Conservative	Geoffrey Carr	105	3.01	New
Conservative	Victor Thompson	97		
Conservative	Nicola Thompson	89		
Registered electors		7,845		▼499
Turnout		3,343	42.61	▼6.11
Rejected ballots		16	0.48	▲0.18
Liberal Democrats hold				
Liberal Democrats hold				
Liberal Democrats hold				

=== Leytonstone ===
Leytonstone (3)
Party	Candidate	Votes	%	±%
Labour	Jennifer Gray*	1,398	47.53	▼4.02
Labour	Huw Morgan-Thomas*	1,268		
Labour	Clyde Loakes	1,237		
Liberal Democrats	John Howard	808	29.11	▲4.28
Liberal Democrats	Shahnaz Malik	807		
Liberal Democrats	Antony Gammage	775		
Green	Maureen Measure	246	8.99	▼1.02
Conservative	Amanda Comber	235	8.12	▼5.49
Conservative	Sylvia Herrington	216		
Conservative	Michael Williams	216		
Independent	Roderick Milroy	171	6.25	New
Registered electors		7,531		▼723
Turnout		2,643	35.09	▼7.77
Rejected ballots		12	0.45	▲0.22
Labour hold				
Labour hold				
Labour hold				

=== Lloyd Park ===
Lloyd Park (3)
Party	Candidate	Votes	%	±%
Labour	Evan Jones*	1,149	58.38	▲8.57
Labour	Martin O'Connor	1,129		
Labour	Narinder Matharoo*	983		
Liberal Democrats	Stanley Forecast	417	22.32	▲2.48
Liberal Democrats	Peter Hatton	416		
Liberal Democrats	Michael Hopkins	414		
Conservative	Cuthbert Brewster	371	19.30	▼0.10
Conservative	Carolyn Edis	360		
Conservative	Andrew Hemsted	347		
Registered electors		7,563		▼694
Turnout		2,114	27.95	▼12.90
Rejected ballots		21	0.99	▲0.84
Labour hold				
Labour hold				
Labour hold				

=== St James Street ===
St James Street (3)
Party	Candidate	Votes	%	±%
Labour	Diana Murray*	1,245	49.83	▲4.85
Labour	Tahir Kamal	1,162		
Labour	Graham Smith	1,153		
Conservative	Ashgar Ali	693	22.86	▲10.11
Conservative	Christine Pollinger	470		
Conservative	David Webb	470		
Liberal Democrats	Yousaff Khan	452	15.05	▲3.29
Liberal Democrats	Mohammed Younis	351		
Green	Thomas Ruxton	292	12.26	▲4.30
Liberal Democrats	Mohammed Sheikh	272		
Registered electors		9,392		▼327
Turnout		2,539	27.03	▼11.83
Rejected ballots		17	0.67	▲0.54
Labour hold				
Labour hold				
Labour hold				

=== Valley ===
Valley (3)
Party	Candidate	Votes	%	±%
Conservative	John Gover*	1,080	45.52	▲2.50
Labour	Margaret Broadley	1,022	41.62	▲13.40
Conservative	Jeremy Evans*	1,018		
Conservative	Nial Finlayson*	997		
Labour	Michael Jeremiah	917		
Labour	Nicholas Russell	891		
Liberal Democrats	David Young	325	12.85	▼8.47
Liberal Democrats	Keith Hardy	286		
Liberal Democrats	Jane Croucher	263		
Registered electors		8,254		▼141
Turnout		2,453	29.72	▼8.67
Rejected ballots		18	0.73	▲0.48
Conservative hold				
Labour gain from Conservative				
Conservative hold				

=== Wood Street ===
Wood Street (3)
Party	Candidate	Votes	%	±%
Labour	Angela Bean* (Note: Bean was elected in a by-election triggered bgy the resignation of Cllr Neal Chubb in 1997)	1,522	41.15	▲0.59
Labour	Chris Dunn	1,367		
Labour	Peter Dawe	1,365		
Liberal Democrats	Peter Leighton*	1,316	37.14	▼8.48
Liberal Democrats	Robert Meadowcroft	1,275		
Liberal Democrats	Sean Meiszner*	1,248		
Conservative	Michael Caplan	394	11.20	▼2.62
Conservative	Tina McMurray	389		
Conservative	Jude Lobendham	375		
Green	Christine Olende	362	10.51	New
Registered electors		8,588		▼192
Turnout		3,315	38.60	▼11.19
Rejected ballots		14	0.42	▲0.35
Labour gain from Liberal Democrats				
Labour gain from Liberal Democrats				
Labour gain from Liberal Democrats				
