= 1994 Waltham Forest London Borough Council election =

1994 local election in England

- 5 May 1994

All 57 seats up for election to Waltham Forest London Borough Council 29 seats needed for a majority
- Registered: 160,833
- Turnout: 71,808, 44.65% (▼6.16)

	First party	Second party	Third party
Leader	Huw Morgan-Thomas	Unknown	Unknown
Party	Labour	Conservative	Liberal Democrats
Leader since	1994	Unknown	Unknown
Leader's seat	Leytonstone	Unknown	Unknown
Last election	30 seats, 38.84%	16 seats, 34.74%	11 seats, 23.60%
Seats before	30	16	11
Seats won	27	16	14
Seat change	▼3	Steady	▲3
Popular vote	81,960	44,677	61,225
Percentage	42.83%	23.34%	31.99%
Swing	▲3.99	▼11.40	▲8.39
Council control before election
Labour
Council control after election
No Overall Control

The 1994 Waltham Forest Council election took place on 5 May 1994 to elect members of Waltham Forest London Borough Council in London, England. The whole council was up for election and the council went into no overall control.

== Election result ==
Waltham Forest local election result 1994
Party	Seats	Gains	Losses	Net gain/loss	Seats %	Votes %	Votes	+/−
Labour	27	1	4	▼3	47.37	42.83	81,960	▲3.99
Conservative	16	0	0	Steady	28.07	23.34	44,677	▼11.40
Liberal Democrats	14	4	1	▲3	24.56	31.99	61,225	▲8.39
Green	0	0	0	Steady	0.00	1.07	2,051	▼1.35
Independent	0	0	0	Steady	0.00	0.55	1,050	▲0.47
Militant Labour	0	0	0	Steady	0.00	0.22	423	New
Total	57						191,386	

== Ward results ==
(*) - Indicates an Incumbent candidate

(†) - Indicates an incumbent candidate who is standing in a different ward

=== Cann Hall ===
Cann Hall (3)
Party	Candidate	Votes	%	±%
Liberal Democrats	Clyde Kitson*	2,081	53.89	▲1.95
Liberal Democrats	Keith Rayner*	1,962		
Liberal Democrats	Elizabeth Phillips	1,925		
Labour	Rita O'Reilly	1,578	40.83	▼0.39
Labour	Marcel Bhugon	1,483		
Labour	Simon Tucker	1,461		
Conservative	Thomas Kelly	255	5.28	▼1.56
Conservative	Roger Hemsted	170		
Conservative	Brian Walker	159		
Registered electors		7,805		▼23
Turnout		3,895	49.90	▼3.31
Rejected ballots		3	0.08	▼0.04
Liberal Democrats hold				
Liberal Democrats hold				
Liberal Democrats hold				

=== Cathall ===
Cathall (3)
Party	Candidate	Votes	%	±%
Labour	Liza Cragg	2,005	65.66	▲4.36
Labour	David Lee*	1,936		
Labour	Terence Wheeler*	1,871		
Liberal Democrats	Huw Jenkins	483	15.76	▲3.50
Liberal Democrats	Peter Mason	471		
Liberal Democrats	Angela Wait	442		
Conservative	Maureen Chambers	331	10.44	▼3.86
Conservative	Peter Chambers	316		
Conservative	Sylvia Herrington	277		
Independent	Thomas Jones	240	8.14	New
Registered electors		8,166		▼114
Turnout		2,994	36.66	▼4.92
Rejected ballots		9	0.30	▲0.13
Labour hold				
Labour hold				
Labour hold				

=== Chapel End ===
Chapel End (3)
Party	Candidate	Votes	%	±%
Liberal Democrats	Robert Belam*	2,103	52.41	▲14.66
Liberal Democrats	Patricia Atherton	2,052		
Liberal Democrats	Graham Woolnough*	1,970		
Labour	Jack Kaye	1,095	26.13	▲3.28
Labour	Sylbert Rudder	992		
Labour	Rukhsana Khan	967		
Conservative	David Angus	688	16.35	▼15.72
Conservative	Michael Caplan	618		
Conservative	Philippa Stone	604		
Green	Richard Burkett	199	5.11	▼2.22
Registered electors		7,917		▼307
Turnout		3,973	50.18	▼5.64
Rejected ballots		3	0.08	▲0.04
Liberal Democrats hold				
Liberal Democrats hold				
Liberal Democrats hold				

=== Chingford Green ===
Chingford Green (3)
Party	Candidate	Votes	%	±%
Conservative	Derek Arnold*	2,121	50.02	▼8.05
Conservative	Michael Fish*	2,078		
Conservative	Michael Lewis*	1,988		
Liberal Democrats	John Beanse	1,295	29.04	▲7.00
Liberal Democrats	Kenneth Coates	1,229		
Liberal Democrats	Monica Phemister	1,068		
Labour	Jill Daines	754	18.03	▲5.63
Labour	Beryl Eccleston	742		
Labour	Elizabeth Lee	732		
Independent	Christine Johns	120	2.91	▲2.31
Registered electors		9,037		▲162
Turnout		4,315	47.75	▼11.16
Rejected ballots		3	0.07	▼0.04
Conservative hold				
Conservative hold				
Conservative hold				

=== Endlebury ===
Endlebury (2)
Party	Candidate	Votes	%	±%
Conservative	Mladen Jovcic*	1,584	57.64	▼9.12
Conservative	Waldemar Neilson-Hansen*	1,419		
Liberal Democrats	Kathleen Mudie	607	22.98	▲10.28
Liberal Democrats	William Goss	590		
Labour	Paul Connell	518	19.38	▲6.53
Labour	Yasmin Beg	492		
Registered electors		6,254		▼10
Turnout		2,773	44.34	▼10.83
Rejected ballots		7	0.25	▲0.13
Conservative hold				
Conservative hold				

=== Forest ===
Forest (3)
Party	Candidate	Votes	%	±%
Labour	Mohammed Rahman^{†} (Note: Rahman was a sitting councillor representing the High Street ward)	1,818	47.86	▲8.59
Labour	Kabal Dhillon	1,768		
Labour	Denise Liunberg*	1,768		
Liberal Democrats	Patrick Smith	1,685	44.93	▲6.04
Liberal Democrats	Juliet Strachan	1,681		
Liberal Democrats	James Tynan	1,662		
Conservative	Jahn Baksh	287	7.21	▼7.31
Conservative	Fiore Hampstead	260		
Conservative	Martyn Hempsted	260		
Registered electors		7,903		▼207
Turnout		4,019	50.85	▲0.65
Rejected ballots		11	0.27	▲0.02
Labour hold				
Labour gain from Liberal Democrats				
Labour hold				

=== Grove Green ===
Grove Green (3)
Party	Candidate	Votes	%	±%
Labour	Tarsem Bhogal*	1,868	55.10	▲6.99
Labour	Andrew Lock	1,818		
Labour	Paul Redcliffe*	1,807		
Liberal Democrats	Paul Mason	900	26.00	▼3.32
Liberal Democrats	Dorothy Morton	880		
Liberal Democrats	Sydney Morton	811		
Conservative	Mohammed Ishaq	419	10.71	▼3.35
Conservative	Gillian Hemsted	339		
Conservative	Kathleenn Smith	311		
Green	Maureen Measure	272	8.19	▼0.32
Registered electors		7,991		▼240
Turnout		3,408	42.65	▼7.60
Rejected ballots		6	0.18	▼0.01
Labour hold				
Labour hold				
Labour hold				

=== Hale End ===
Hale End (2)
Party	Candidate	Votes	%	±%
Conservative	Lesley Finlayson*	1,065	37.32	▼17.64
Conservative	Douglas Norman*	1,053		
Liberal Democrats	James O'Rourke	876	30.58	▲19.87
Liberal Democrats	Ian Paterson	860		
Labour	Jean Black	702	24.70	▲1.58
Labour	Patrick Hart	699		
Green	Robert Tatam	210	7.40	▼3.81
Registered electors		5,356		▼155
Turnout		2,866	53.51	▼4.30
Rejected ballots		2	0.07	▼0.09
Conservative hold				
Conservative hold				

=== Hatch Lane ===
Hatch Lane (3)
Party	Candidate	Votes	%	±%
Conservative	Jane Watts*	1,655	48.41	▼5.49
Conservative	Laurie Braham*	1,652		
Conservative	Geoffrey Walker	1,627		
Labour	Christopher Duran	1,017	28.93	▲2.96
Labour	Donald Henry	1,012		
Labour	Sagar Sehgal	920		
Liberal Democrats	Joan Carder	790	22.66	▲11.03
Liberal Democrats	Edna Harper	769		
Liberal Democrats	Michael Foulds	750		
Registered electors		8,291		▼291
Turnout		3,681	44.40	▼9.35
Rejected ballots		7	0.19	▲0.06
Conservative hold				
Conservative hold				
Conservative hold				

=== High Street ===
High Street (3)
Party	Candidate	Votes	%	±%
Labour	Liaquat Ali	1,876	54.02	▲7.02
Labour	Jennifer Williams	1,808		
Labour	Aktar Beg*	1,722		
Liberal Democrats	Peter Hatton	1,030	30.46	▲8.75
Liberal Democrats	Peter Woollcott	1,024		
Liberal Democrats	Mohammad Mir	995		
Conservative	Janice Guest	552	15.53	▼13.73
Conservative	Anthony O'Connor	524		
Conservative	Anne Havelock-Lipman	478		
Registered electors		8,098		▲16
Turnout		3,626	44.78	▼6.05
Rejected ballots		8	0.22	▲0.03
Labour hold				
Labour hold				
Labour hold				

=== Higham Hill ===
Higham Hill (2)
Party	Candidate	Votes	%	±%
Liberal Democrats	Robert Wheatley	1,665	66.76	▲8.43
Liberal Democrats	Robert Carey*	1,596		
Labour	Kazim Altan	647	25.13	▼0.82
Labour	Amarjit Devgun	581		
Conservative	Albert Read	209	8.11	▼7.61
Conservative	Nazir Khiljee	187		
Registered electors		5,038		▲39
Turnout		2,547	50.56	▼4.33
Rejected ballots		5	0.20	▲0.09
Liberal Democrats hold				
Liberal Democrats hold				

=== Hoe Street ===
Hoe Street (3)
Party	Candidate	Votes	%	±%
Labour	Sylvia Poulsen*	2,088	52.51	▲2.33
Labour	Mohammed Nasim	2,081		
Labour	Eric Sizer*	2,079		
Conservative	Ashgar Ali	896	20.32	▼5.14
Conservative	David Richards	795		
Conservative	Mushtaq Sheikh	726		
Liberal Democrats	Michael Harkin	618	15.30	▲5.90
Liberal Democrats	Frank Blewett	615		
Liberal Democrats	Anthony Long	588		
Green	Stephen Lambert	471	11.87	▼1.10
Registered electors		9,246		▲202
Turnout		4,069	44.01	▼6.10
Rejected ballots		10	0.25	▲0.03
Labour hold				
Labour hold				
Labour hold				

=== Larkswood ===
Larkswood (3)
Party	Candidate	Votes	%	±%
Conservative	John Walter	2,013	51.25	▼8.44
Conservative	Eric Williams*	1,948		
Conservative	Michael Thompson	1,932		
Labour	Carolyn Brown	1,134	28.34	▲7.61
Labour	Patricia Evans	1,132		
Labour	Evelyn Wilson	991		
Liberal Democrats	Sylvia Bird	797	20.41	▲9.68
Liberal Democrats	Violet Wells	791		
Liberal Democrats	Keith Wenden	759		
Registered electors		9,841		▲95
Turnout		4,214	42.82	▼9.39
Rejected ballots		13	0.31	▲0.27
Conservative hold				
Conservative hold				
Conservative hold				

=== Lea Bridge ===
Lea Bridge (3)
Party	Candidate	Votes	%	±%
Labour	Anthony Buckley	1,865	62.86	▲9.64
Labour	Sarah Buckley	1,848		
Labour	Meher Khan*	1,714		
Conservative	Bashir Chaudhry	599	18.45	▼10.63
Conservative	John Goodman	545		
Liberal Democrats	Jeniffer Sullivan	492	15.46	▲1.77
Conservative	John Penrose	450		
Liberal Democrats	Mariette Mason	447		
Liberal Democrats	Caroline Tynan	396		
Independent	Francis Owusu	93	3.23	▼0.78
Registered electors		8,141		▼75
Turnout		3,080	37.83	▼6.84
Rejected ballots		10	0.32	▲0.07
Labour hold				
Labour hold				
Labour hold				

=== Leyton ===
Leyton (3)
Party	Candidate	Votes	%	±%
Liberal Democrats	Robert Sullivan*	2,081	52.63	▲6.25
Liberal Democrats	Loretta Hodges	1,981		
Liberal Democrats	Charles Tuckey	1,893		
Labour	Denis Gray*	1,874	47.36	▲2.72
Labour	Sajid Ramzan	1,748		
Labour	Crispin St Hill	1,735		
Registered electors		8,344		▼40
Turnout		4,065	48.72	▼1.60
Rejected ballots		12	0.30	▲0.06
Liberal Democrats hold				
Liberal Democrats hold				
Liberal Democrats gain from Labour				

=== Leytonstone ===
Leytonstone (3)
Party	Candidate	Votes	%	±%
Labour	Jennifer Gray* (Note: Gray replaced Cllr Patrick Haynes after his resignation in 1992)	1,801	51.55	▼2.50
Labour	Huw Morgan-Thomas*	1,790		
Labour	Chris Brind	1,737		
Liberal Democrats	Grace Chandler	881	24.83	▲14.89
Liberal Democrats	John Howard	853		
Liberal Democrats	Elizabeth Toull	832		
Conservative	Mohmedhanif Bagas	627	13.61	▼8.56
Conservative	Geoffrey Carr	401		
Conservative	Raymond Luker	379		
Green	William Measure	345	10.01	▼3.84
Registered electors		8,254		▲30
Turnout		3,538	42.86	▼3.76
Rejected ballots		8	0.23	▲0.07
Labour hold				
Labour hold				
Labour hold				

=== Lloyd Park ===
Lloyd Park (3)
Party	Candidate	Votes	%	±%
Labour	Evan Jones*	1,750	49.81	▲7.76
Labour	John Pearson*	1,624		
Labour	Narinder Matharoo*	1,430		
Conservative	Susan Webb	720	19.40	▼15.26
Liberal Democrats	Eric Tidmarsh	665	19.84	▲8.18
Liberal Democrats	Stanley Forecast	632		
Liberal Democrats	Patricia Tidmarsh	616		
Conservative	Khalid Bhatti	580		
Conservative	Mustak Banglawala	571		
Independent	David Bracegirdle	352	10.95	New
Registered electors		8,257		▲6
Turnout		3,373	40.85	▼9.57
Rejected ballots		5	0.15	Steady
Labour hold				
Labour hold				
Labour hold				

=== St James Street ===
St James Street (3)
Party	Candidate	Votes	%	±%
Labour	Diana Murray	1,925	44.98	▼0.45
Labour	Mohammad Khan	1,779		
Labour	Mohsin Beg	1,741		
Conservative	Iris Bishop	776	18.75	▼7.20
Conservative	David Webb	748		
Conservative	Saleem Khan	746		
Liberal Democrats	Jacqueline Tidmarsh	515	11.76	▲1.72
Liberal Democrats	Peter Dunphy	485		
Liberal Democrats	Richard Tidmarsh	424		
Militant Labour	Louise Thompson	423	10.48	New
Green	Lisa Nolan	321	7.96	▼7.05
Independent	Ali Abbasi	245	6.07	New
Registered electors		9,719		▼13
Turnout		3,777	38.86	▼3.60
Rejected ballots		5	0.13	▼0.04
Labour hold				
Labour hold				
Labour hold				

=== Valley ===
Valley (3)
Party	Candidate	Votes	%	±%
Conservative	John Gover	1,351	43.02	▼20.23
Conservative	Nial Finlayson	1,350		
Conservative	Jeremy Evans*	1,339		
Labour	Ruth Carroll	916	28.22	▲4.03
Labour	Stephen Garrett	871		
Labour	Ian Etherington	863		
Liberal Democrats	Henry Boyle	707	21.32	▲8.76
Liberal Democrats	Mary Phillips	663		
Liberal Democrats	Jolyon Walker	632		
Green	John Baguley	233	7.44	New
Registered electors		8,395		▼16
Turnout		3,223	38.39	▼10.61
Rejected ballots		8	0.25	▼0.02
Conservative hold				
Conservative hold				
Conservative hold				

=== Wood Street ===
Wood Street (3)
Party	Candidate	Votes	%	±%
Liberal Democrats	Peter Leighton	1,957	45.62	▲16.25
Liberal Democrats	Neal Chubb	1,877		
Liberal Democrats	Sean Meiszner	1,776		
Labour	William Anstey*	1,740	40.56	▲2.25
Labour	Peter Dawe	1,651		
Labour	William Shepherd*	1,596		
Conservative	Robert Brock	588	13.82	▼18.50
Conservative	Mohammed Sheikh	565		
Conservative	Denis Sullivan	546		
Registered electors		8,780		▲500
Turnout		4,372	49.79	▲8.21
Rejected ballots		3	0.07	▼0.10
Liberal Democrats gain from Labour				
Liberal Democrats gain from Labour				
Liberal Democrats gain from Labour				
