= 1990 Waltham Forest London Borough Council election =

Local election in England

- 3 May 1990

57 seats for election to Waltham Forest London Borough Council 29 seats needed for a majority
- Registered: 161,922
- Turnout: 82,268, 50.81%
	First party	Second party	Third party
Leader	Clive Morton	Unknown	Unknown
Party	Labour	Conservative	Liberal Democrats
Leader since	3 May 1990	Unknown	Unknown
Leader's seat	Lea Bridge	Unknown	Unknown
Seats before	31	16	10
Seats won	30	16	11 (Note: includes results from Lib Dem Focus Team candidates)
Seat change	▼1	Steady	▲1
Popular vote	86,093	77,003	52,308
Percentage	38.84%	34.74%	23.60%
Council control before election
Labour
Council control after election
Labour

The 1990 Waltham Forest Council election took place on 3 May 1990 to elect members of Waltham Forest London Borough Council in London, England. The whole council was up for election and the Labour party stayed in overall control of the council.

== Election result ==
1990 Waltham Forest London Borough Council election
Party	Seats	Gains	Losses	Net gain/loss	Seats %	Votes %	Votes	+/−
Labour	30	3	4	▼1	57.89	38.84	86,093	
Conservative	16	0	0	Steady	22.81	34.74	77,003	
Liberal Democrats	11	4	3	▲1	19.30	23.60	52,308	
Green	0	0	0	Steady	0.00	2.42	5,377	
Democrats and Commonwealth Party	0	0	0	Steady	0.00	0.25	549	
Independent	0	0	0	Steady	0.00	0.08	172	
Communist	0	0	0	Steady	0.00	0.07	166	
Total	57						221,668	

== Ward results ==
=== Cann Hall ===
Cann Hall (3)
Party	Candidate	Votes	%
Lib Dem Focus Team	Clyde Kitson*	2,175	51.94
Lib Dem Focus Team	Christopher Millington*	2,058	
Lib Dem Focus Team	Keith A. Rayner	2,007	
Labour	William J. Dennis	1,713	41.22
Labour	Rita O'Reilly	1,661	
Labour	Simon P. Tucker	1,578	
Conservative	Mary I. Neilson-Hansen	291	6.84
Conservative	Robert F. Pringle	279	
Conservative	Joan E. Smith	251	
Registered electors		7,828	
Turnout		4,165	53.21
Rejected ballots		5	0.12
Lib Dem Focus Team hold			
Lib Dem Focus Team hold			
Lib Dem Focus Team hold			

=== Cathall ===
Cathall (3)
Party	Candidate	Votes	%
Labour	John J. Walsh*	2,217	61.30
Labour	David J. Lee	2,142	
Labour	Terence V. Wheeler*	2,062	
Conservative	Kenneth C. Lovell	532	14.30
Conservative	Julia M.C. Coltelli	487	
Conservative	Paul Stafford	478	
Lib Dem Focus Team	Lorraine Benstead	458	12.26
Lib Dem Focus Team	Geraldine Shelley	415	
Lib Dem Focus Team	Peter J.W. Mason	410	
Green	Catherine L. Towers	330	9.45
Communist	Eleanror D. Cowley	94	2.69
Registered electors		8,280	
Turnout		3,443	41.58
Rejected ballots		6	0.17
Labour hold			
Labour hold			
Labour hold			

=== Chapel End ===
Chapel End (3)
Party	Candidate	Votes	%
Liberal Democrats	Lucille D. Wells*	1,756	37.75
Liberal Democrats	Robert D. Belam	1,716	
Liberal Democrats	Graham A. Woolnough*	1,690	
Conservative	Joyce Q.L. Unwin	1,477	32.07
Conservative	Anita L. Owen	1,475	
Conservative	Steven Strum	1,434	
Labour	Michael McD. Cummins	1,127	22.85
Labour	Iain R. McWhinnie	1,002	
Labour	Neville Stephenson	996	
Green	David Downing	334	7.33
Registered electors		8,224	
Turnout		4,591	55.82
Rejected ballots		2	0.04
Liberal Democrats hold			
Liberal Democrats hold			
Liberal Democrats hold			

=== Chingford Green ===
Chingford Green (3)
Party	Candidate	Votes	%
Conservative	Michael C. Fish*	3,135	58.07
Conservative	Michael J. Lewis*	3,062	
Conservative	Derek B. Arnold*	3,060	
Liberal Democrats	John D. Beanse	1,209	22.04
Liberal Democrats	Cyril G. Abley	1,173	
Liberal Democrats	Keith J. Wenden	1,131	
Labour	Elizabeth J. Lee	694	12.40
Labour	William J. Bayliss	689	
Labour	Richard C. Sweden	593	
Green	Peter A. Chipperfield	366	6.89
Independent	Christine M. Yianni	32	0.60
Registered electors		8,875	
Turnout		5,228	58.91
Rejected ballots		6	0.11
Conservative hold			
Conservative hold			
Conservative hold			

=== Endlebury ===
Endlebury (2)
Party	Candidate	Votes	%
Conservative	Mladen Jovcic*	2,333	66.76
Conservative	Waldemar T. Neilson-Hansen*	2,145	
Labour	Paul H. Connell	509	12.85
Liberal Democrats	Andrew J. Crossley	433	12.70
Liberal Democrats	Ian A. Paterson	418	
Labour	Mary J. Davey	352	
Green	John E. Morgan	258	7.69
Registered electors		6,264	
Turnout		3,456	55.17
Rejected ballots		4	0.12
Conservative hold			
Conservative hold			

=== Forest ===
Forest (3)
Party	Candidate	Votes	%
Labour	Denis Liunberg*	1,599	39.27
Lib Dem Focus Team	Simon G. Banks	1,589	38.89
Labour	Shameem K.A. Mahmood	1,562	
Lib Dem Focus Team	Caroline A. Tynan	1,559	
Labour	Mohammad A. Chughtai	1,521	
Lib Dem Focus Team	James V. Tynan	1,489	
Conservative	George F. Ames	600	14.52
Conservative	David A. Harris	571	
Conservative	Jean Wilkins	559	
Green	Hamish Macallion	291	7.32
Registered electors		8,110	
Turnout		4,071	50.20
Rejected ballots		10	0.25
Labour hold			
Lib Dem Focus Team gain from Labour			
Labour hold			

=== Grove Green ===
Grove Green (3)
Party	Candidate	Votes	%
Labour	Tarsem S. Bhogal*	2,022	48.11
Labour	Brett Haran*	1,993	
Labour	Paul E. Redcliffe*	1,936	
Lib Dem Focus Team	Cameron M. Black	1,230	29.32
Lib Dem Focus Team	Nazir A. Butt	1,210	
Lib Dem Focus Team	Daniel McCormick	1,187	
Conservative	Irene Carter	593	14.06
Conservative	Lesley Hope	583	
Conservative	David Hoey	564	
Green	Jacky Carpenter	351	8.51
Registered electors		8,231	
Turnout		4,136	50.25
Rejected ballots		8	0.19
Labour hold			
Labour hold			
Labour hold			

=== Hale End ===
Hale End (2)
Party	Candidate	Votes	%
Conservative	Lesley A. Finlayson	1,738	54.96
Conservative	Douglas A. Norman	1,731	
Labour	Patrick R. Hart	750	23.12
Labour	Sally L. Odde	709	
Liberal Democrats	Sylvia A. Bird	440	10.71
Green	Robert F. Tatam	354	11.21
Liberal Democrats	Syed Hashmi	235	
Registered electors		5,511	
Turnout		3,186	57.81
Rejected ballots		5	0.16
Conservative hold			
Conservative hold			

=== Hatch Lane ===
Hatch Lane (3)
Party	Candidate	Votes	%
Conservative	Laurie Braham*	2,484	53.90
Conservative	Jane Watts*	2,458	
Conservative	Dennis W. Sullivan*	2,418	
Labour	Jeffrey G. Blay	1,225	25.97
Labour	Donald W. Henry	1,210	
Labour	Sadie P. Shinkins	1,110	
Liberal Democrats	Edna Harper	588	11.63
Liberal Democrats	Kathleen G. Mudie	512	
Liberal Democrats	Arthur J. Wright	488	
Green	Richard D. Barton	387	8.50
Registered electors		8,582	
Turnout		4,613	53.75
Rejected ballots		6	0.13
Conservative hold			
Conservative hold			
Conservative hold			

=== High Street ===
High Street (3)
Party	Candidate	Votes	%
Labour	John W. Wylie	1,855	47.00
Labour	Mohammed F. Rahman*	1,791	
Labour	Aktar Beg	1,766	
Conservative	Jacqueline A. Bates	1,153	29.26
Conservative	Frederick J. Page	1,113	
Conservative	Thomas H. Kelly	1,102	
Lib Dem Focus Team	Derek John	903	21.71
Lib Dem Focus Team	Peter L. Leighton	873	
Lib Dem Focus Team	Abu Y.M. Abdul Wadud	722	
Democrats and Commonwealth	Nasri Islam	84	2.03
Democrats and Commonwealth	Ishaq Masih	72	
Registered electors		8,082	
Turnout		4,108	50.83
Rejected ballots		8	0.19
Labour hold			
Labour hold			
Labour hold			

=== Higham Hill ===
Higham Hill (2)
Party	Candidate	Votes	%
Lib Dem Focus Team	Robert J. Carey	1,571	58.33
Lib Dem Focus Team	Robert A. Carey	1,441	
Labour	Robert T. Robson	677	25.95
Labour	Kenneth R. Sanders	662	
Conservative	James P. Ryan	410	15.72
Conservative	Malcolm G.N. Fordyce	402	
Registered electors		4,999	
Turnout		2,744	54.89
Rejected ballots		3	0.11
Lib Dem Focus Team gain from Labour			
Lib Dem Focus Team gain from Labour			

=== Hoe Street ===
Hoe Street (3)
Party	Candidate	Votes	%
Labour	Sylvia A. Poulsen	2,632	50.18
Labour	Eric G. Sizer*	2,294	
Labour	Crispin R. St Hill	2,105	
Conservative	Iain C. Dale	1,231	25.46
Conservative	Doris V. Agass	1,195	
Conservative	Geoffrey Chinosky	1,141	
Green	Stephen W. Lambert	606	12.97
Lib Dem Focus Team	Frank Blewett	472	9.40
Lib Dem Focus Team	Michael T. Tall	428	
Lib Dem Focus Team	Norman F. Enders	418	
Democrats and Commonwealth	Mukhtar Ahmed	103	1.99
Democrats and Commonwealth	Anwar-ul-Mulk Chaudhry	83	
Registered electors		9,044	
Turnout		4,532	50.11
Rejected ballots		10	0.22
Labour hold			
Labour hold			
Labour hold			

=== Larkswood ===
Larkswood (3)
Party	Candidate	Votes	%
Conservative	Eric G. Williams	3,044	59.69
Conservative	William J. Emmins	2,954	
Conservative	Michael E. Saile	2,949	
Labour	Georgina E. Day	1,087	20.73
Labour	Ian Etherington	1,015	
Labour	Christopher P. Duran	1,005	
Liberal Democrats	Cynthia J. Wenden	542	10.73
Liberal Democrats	Monica Phemister	539	
Liberal Democrats	Michael R. Foulds	528	
Green	David J. Bates	442	8.85
Registered electors		9,736	
Turnout		5,083	52.21
Rejected ballots		2	0.04
Conservative hold			
Conservative hold			
Conservative hold			

=== Lea Bridge ===
Lea Bridge (3)
Party	Candidate	Votes	%
Labour	Erdine L. King	1,888	53.22
Labour	Clive W. Morton*	1,872	
Labour	Meher Khan	1,814	
Conservative	Irene M. Mayo	1,025	29.08
Conservative	Edward C. Smith	1,023	
Conservative	John William Fosh	996	
Lib Dem Focus Team	Jennifer A. Ford	520	13.69
Lib Dem Focus Team	Jennifer E. Sullivan	457	
Lib Dem Focus Team	Mariette T. Mason	456	
Independent	George D. Kennington	140	4.01
Registered electors		8,216	
Turnout		3,670	44.67
Rejected ballots		9	0.25
Labour hold			
Labour hold			
Labour hold			

=== Leyton ===
Leyton (3)
Party	Candidate	Votes	%
Lib Dem Focus Team	Robert F. Sullivan	1,892	46.38
Lib Dem Focus Team	David H. Worsfold	1,832	
Labour	Denis K. Gray	1,831	44.64
Lib Dem Focus Team	Angela J. Wait	1,810	
Labour	Jennifer Gray	1,773	
Labour	Jonathan Wray	1,723	
Conservative	David M. Evans	328	7.52
Conservative	Iain J. Mackie	287	
Conservative	Roger W. Hemsted	282	
Democrats and Commonwealth	Hafeez-ul-Haque	58	1.46
Registered electors		8,384	
Turnout		4,219	50.32
Rejected ballots		10	0.24
Lib Dem Focus Team gain from Labour			
Lib Dem Focus Team hold			
Labour gain from Lib Dem Focus Team			

=== Leytonstone ===
Leytonstone (3)
Party	Candidate	Votes	%
Labour	Eva E. Edworthy*	2,274	54.05
Labour	Patrick J. Hayes	2,153	
Labour	Huw M. Morgan-Thomas	2,002	
Conservative	Nial Finlayson	904	22.17
Conservative	Raymond E. Luker	896	
Conservative	Roger Kapur	836	
Green	Catherine E. Girvan	549	13.85
Lib Dem Focus Team	Christopher Gould	450	9.94
Lib Dem Focus Team	Dennis Hallam	369	
Lib Dem Focus Team	Huw G. Jenkins	364	
Registered electors		8,224	
Turnout		3,834	46.62
Rejected ballots		6	0.16
Labour hold			
Labour hold			
Labour hold			

=== Lloyd Park ===
Lloyd Park (3)
Party	Candidate	Votes	%
Labour	Evan M. Jones	1,823	42.05
Labour	John M. Pearson	1,735	
Labour	Narinder S. Matheroo*	1,581	
Conservative	Gillian S. Langford	1,444	34.66
Conservative	Jacqueline A. Middlemiss	1,404	
Conservative	Susan F. Webb	1,388	
Lib Dem Focus Team	James A. Kingsland	487	11.66
Green	Thomas H. Cole	474	11.63
Lib Dem Focus Team	David R.W. Bracegirdle	470	
Lib Dem Focus Team	Jeremy R. Dauncey	469	
Registered electors		8,251	
Turnout		4,078	49.42
Rejected ballots		6	0.15
Labour hold			
Labour hold			
Labour hold			

=== St James Street ===
St James Street (3)
Party	Candidate	Votes	%
Labour	Franklyn E. Georges	1,952	45.53
Labour	Sylbert Rudder	1,918	
Labour	Amarjit S. Devgun	1,912	
Conservative	Robert W. Bates	1,187	25.95
Conservative	Chris J. Galley	1,117	
Conservative	Nerea N. Osore	991	
Green	Angela V. Osore	635	15.01
Lib Dem Focus Team	Farid Ahmed	428	10.04
Lib Dem Focus Team	Jonathan Myall	424	
Lib Dem Focus Team	Richard L. Tidmarsh	423	
Democrats and Commonwealth	Imtiaz Qadir	80	1.77
Communist	Gerald W. Pocock	72	1.70
Democrats and Commonwealth	Munir Ullah	69	
Registered electors		9,732	
Turnout		4,132	42.46
Rejected ballots		7	0.17
Labour hold			
Labour hold			
Labour hold			

=== Valley ===
Valley (3)
Party	Candidate	Votes	%
Conservative	Stanley D. Pay	2,476	63.25
Conservative	Jeremy R. Evans	2,346	
Conservative	Christine Smith	2,339	
Labour	Terence J. Donovan	960	24.19
Labour	Jonathan E. Brind	901	
Labour	John R. Holmes	877	
Liberal Democrats	Henry A. Boyle	491	12.56
Liberal Democrats	Joylon W. Walker	475	
Liberal Democrats	Joan M. Carder	457	
Registered electors		8,411	
Turnout		4,121	49.00
Rejected ballots		11	0.27
Conservative hold			
Conservative hold			
Conservative hold			

=== Wood Street ===
Wood Street (3)
Party	Candidate	Votes	%
Labour	William G. Anstey	1,870	38.31
Labour	Jack Kaye	1,711	
Labour	William D. Shepherd	1,662	
Conservative	Deborah M. Dobinson	1,522	32.32
Conservative	Jonathan P. Dobinson	1,484	
Lib Dem Focus Team	Patricia A. Atherton	1,448	29.37
Conservative	Graham F. Sinclair	1,418	
Lib Dem Focus Team	Terence C. Messenger	1,316	
Lib Dem Focus Team	Angela M. Tall	1,257	
Registered electors		8,938	
Turnout		4,858	54.35
Rejected ballots		7	0.14
Labour hold			
Labour gain from Lib Dem Focus Team			
Labour gain from Lib Dem Focus Team			
