= 2003 London Conservative Party mayoral selection =

London Conservative Party mayoral selection 2003
- 16 February 2003
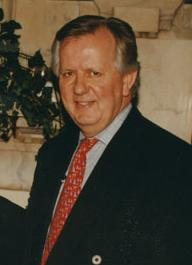

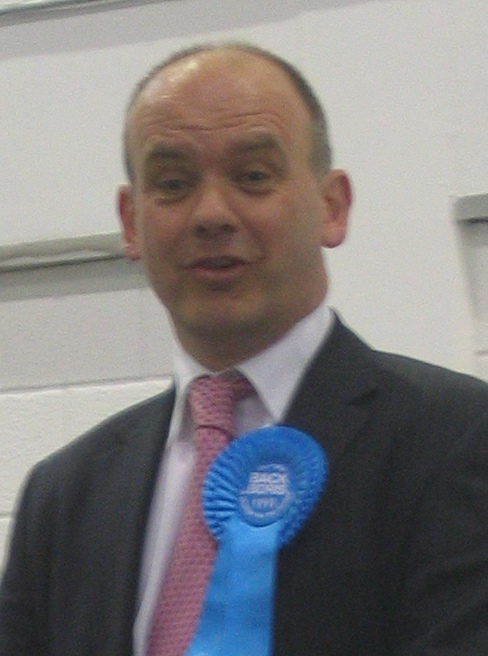
Candidate	Steven Norris	Roger Evans
Popular vote	12,161	3,637
Percentage	77.0%	23.0%
Elected Mayoral candidate
Steven Norris
Conservative

The London Conservative Party mayoral selection of 2003 was the process by which the Conservative Party selected its candidate for Mayor of London, to stand in the 2004 mayoral election. Former Member of Parliament Steven Norris was selected to stand.

== Selection process ==
The Mayoral candidate was selected via a postal ballot of London Conservative Party members.

== Candidates ==
- Steven Norris, candidate for London Mayor in 2000, Member of Parliament for Epping Forest 1988-1997
- Roger Evans, London Assembly member for Havering and Redbridge

== Result ==
Steven Norris, previously the Conservative Party mayoral candidate in 2000 and the former MP for Epping Forest, was reselected by a wide margin over Havering and Redbridge Assembly Member and Conservative spokesman for Transport Roger Evans on the 16 February 2003.

Candidate	Votes	%
Steven Norris	12,161	77.0
Roger Evans AM	3,637	23.0
Total	15,798	

== See also ==
- 2004 London mayoral election
