= Grove Green (ward) =

- Electoral ward for the Waltham Forest London Borough Council
- Grove Green ward boundaries since 2022
- Borough: Waltham Forest
- County: Greater London
- Population: 14,604 (2011); 14,746 (2021) (Note: 2021 Census data reported for 2022 ward boundaries)
- Electorate: 9,982 (2022)
- Major settlements: Leyton, Leytonstone
- Area: 0.8983 square kilometres (0.3468 sq mi)

Current electoral ward
- Created: 1978
- Number of members: 3
- Councillors: Anna Mbachu; Khevyn Limbajee; Uzma Rasool
- Created from: Central
- ONS code: 00BHGD (2002–2022)
- GSS code: E05000596 (2002–2022); E05013888 (2022–present)

Grove Green is an electoral ward in the London Borough of Waltham Forest. The ward was first used in the 1978 elections. It returns three councillors to Waltham Forest London Borough Council.

== Social issues ==
The council, as of 2011, assessed 30% of the ward population to be in poverty.

== Waltham Forest council elections since 2022 ==
There was a revision of ward boundaries in Waltham Forest in 2022. The ward gained some territory in the northeast that had been part of the Leytonstone ward.

=== 2022 election ===
The election took place on 5 May 2022.

2022 Waltham Forest London Borough Council election: Grove Green
Party	Candidate	Votes	%	±%
Labour	Khevyn Limbajee	1,615	56.9	
Labour	Anna Mbachu	1,516	53.4	
Labour	Uzma Rasool	1,487	52.4	
Liberal Democrats	Arran Angus	937	33.0	
Liberal Democrats	Naomi McCarthy	819	28.9	
Green	Maureen Measure	733	25.8	
Liberal Democrats	Joe Dyer	720	25.4	
Conservative	Kathleen Berg	182	6.4	
Conservative	Iona Berg	181	6.4	
Conservative	Luke Berg	171	6.0	
TUSC	Kevin Parslow	150	5.3	
Turnout			30.5	
Labour win (new boundaries)				
Labour win (new boundaries)				
Labour win (new boundaries)				

== 2002–2022 Waltham Forest council elections ==
Grove Green ward boundaries from 2002 to 2022

There was a revision of ward boundaries in Waltham Forest in 2002. The ward boundary in the southeast was extended from Grove Green Road to the A12 Eastern Avenue.

=== 2021 by-election ===
The by-election took place on 10 June 2021, following the death of death of Chris Robbins.

2021 Grove Green by-election
Party	Candidate	Votes	%	±%
Labour	Uzma Rasool	1,301	58.4	+4.1
Liberal Democrats	Arran Angus	541	24.3	+0.6
Green	Mark Dawes	205	9.2	−2.9
Conservative	Shahamima Khan	142	6.4	−0.1
TUSC	Kevin Parslow	40	1.8	−1.6
Majority		760	34.1	
Turnout		2,229		
Labour hold		Swing		

=== 2018 election ===
The election took place on 3 May 2018.

2018 Waltham Forest London Borough Council election: Grove Green
Party	Candidate	Votes	%	±%
Labour Co-op	Anna Mbachu	2,052	59.2	
Labour Co-op	Khevyn Limbajee	2,047	59.0	
Labour Co-op	Chris Robbins	1,997	57.6	
Liberal Democrats	Arran Angus	897	25.9	
Liberal Democrats	Naomi McCarthy	725	20.9	
Liberal Democrats	Ukonu Obasi	623	18.0	
Green	Deanna Donovan	456	13.1	
Green	Liam Connor	416	12.0	
Conservative	Jane Bartram	247	7.1	
Conservative	James Ellingham	216	6.2	
Conservative	Thor Halland	200	5.8	
TUSC	Sarah Sachs-Eldridge	128	3.7	
Turnout			34.93%	
Majority		1,100		
Labour Co-op hold		Swing		
Labour Co-op hold		Swing		
Labour Co-op hold		Swing		

=== 2014 election ===
The election took place on 22 May 2014.

2014 Waltham Forest London Borough Council election: Grove Green
Party	Candidate	Votes	%	±%
Labour	Chris Robbins	1,858	50.5	
Labour	Anna Mbachu	1,751	47.6	
Labour	Khevyn Limbajee	1,686	45.8	
Liberal Democrats	Imran Mahmood	1,009	27.4	
Liberal Democrats	Naser Masood	865	23.5	
Liberal Democrats	Andrei Ilies	856	23.3	
Green	Bill Measure	507	13.8	
Green	Maureen Measure	485	13.2	
Conservative	Jacqueline Howe	345	9.4	
Conservative	Pervalz Khan	335	9.1	
Conservative	Lauren Smith	335	9.1	
TUSC	Nic Fripp	160	4.3	
TUSC	Tim Roedel	86	2.3	
Turnout		3,681	37.1	
Labour hold		Swing		
Labour hold		Swing		
Labour hold		Swing		

=== 2010 election ===
The election on 6 May 2010 took place on the same day as the United Kingdom general election.

=== 2006 election ===
The election took place on 4 May 2006.

=== 2002 election ===
The election took place on 2 May 2002.

2002 Waltham Forest London Borough Council election: Grove Green
Party	Candidate	Votes	%	±%
Labour	Tarsem Bhogal	1,169	39.05	
Liberal Democrats	Jennifer Sullivan	1,103	39.09	
Labour	Chris Robbins	1,081		
Liberal Democrats	Paul Olford	1,052		
Liberal Democrats	Neal Chubb	1,048		
Labour	Peter Woodrow	949		
Green	Helen Griffith	265	7.93	
Conservative	Mohammed Qureshi	235	7.96	
Conservative	Joan Devine	226		
Green	Maureen Measure	218		
Conservative	Derek Pryor	191		
Green	William Measure	167		
London Socialist	Thomas Taylor	163	5.97	
Registered electors		8,513		
Turnout		2,792	32.80	
Rejected ballots		5	0.18	
Labour win (new boundaries)				
Labour win (new boundaries)				
Labour win (new boundaries)				

== 1978–2002 Waltham Forest council elections ==
Grove Green ward boundaries from 1978 to 2002

=== 1998 election ===
The election on 7 May 1998 took place on the same day as the 1998 Greater London Authority referendum.

1998 Waltham Forest London Borough Council election: Grove Green
Party	Candidate	Votes	%	±%
Labour	Tarsem Bhogal	1,203	47.89	▼7.21
Labour	Jane Duran	1,133		
Labour	Andrew Lock	1,108		
Liberal Democrats	Nazir Butt	821	32.30	▲6.30
Liberal Democrats	Mohamed Bagas	772		
Liberal Democrats	Jeniffer Sullivan	730		
Green	William Measure	277	11.56	▲3.37
Conservative	Rosemary Holman	226	8.25	▼2.46
Conservative	Barbara Martin	193		
Conservative	Pamela Jovcic	173		
Registered electors		7,782		▼209
Turnout		2,439	31.34	▼11.31
Rejected ballots		31	1.27	▲1.09
Labour hold		Swing		
Labour hold		Swing		
Labour hold		Swing		

=== 1994 election ===
The election took place on 5 May 1994.

=== 1990 election ===
The election took place on 3 May 1990.

=== 1986 election ===
The election took place on 8 May 1986.

=== 1983 by-election ===
The by-election took place on 29 September 1983, following the resignation of Harry Cohen.

1983 Grove Green by-election
Party	Candidate	Votes	%	±%
Liberal	Wade Gibson-Knight	1,545		
Labour	Jeremy Miles	1,396		
Conservative	Edward Donnelly	378		
Turnout			39.4	
Liberal gain from Labour		Swing		

=== 1982 election ===
The election took place on 6 May 1982.

1982 Waltham Forest London Borough Council election: Grove Green
Party	Candidate	Votes	%	±%
Labour	Mohmmad Khan	1.272		
Labour	Harry Cohen	1,221		
Labour	Eleanor Bartram	1,160		
Alliance	Wade Gibson-Knigh	989		
Alliance	Andrew Lee	966		
Alliance	Peter Mason	922		
Conservative	Irene Carter	839		
Conservative	Raymond Luker	781		
Conservative	Margaret Luker	767		
Turnout				
Labour hold		Swing		
Labour hold		Swing		
Labour hold		Swing		

=== 1978 election ===
The election took place on 4 May 1978.

1978 Waltham Forest London Borough Council election: Grove Green (3)
Party	Candidate	Votes	%	±%
Labour	Eleanor Bartram	1,709		
Labour	Mohmmad Khan	1,683		
Labour	Harry Cohen	1,509		
Conservative	Raymond Luker	1,320		
Conservative	Iain Mackie			
Conservative	Sheridan Mount	1,236		
National Front	Terence Bull	266		
National Front	Richard Perkins	225		
National Front	Roy Smart	209		
Turnout				
Labour win (new seat)				
Labour win (new seat)				
Labour win (new seat)				
