= Roger Evans, Baron Evans of Guisborough =

British politician (born 1964)

The Right Honourable The Lord Evans of Guisborough
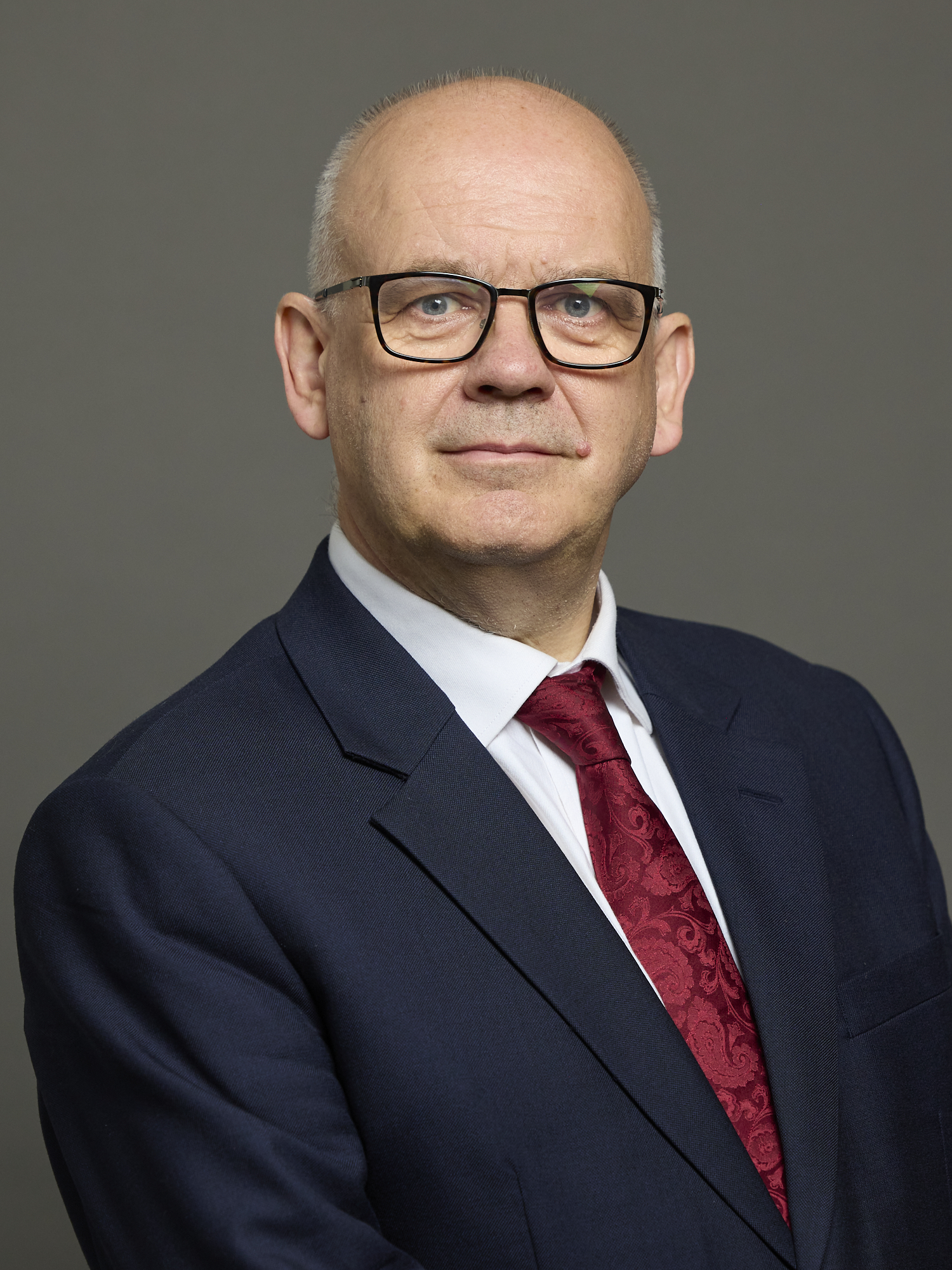
- Official portrait, 2025

Member of the House of Lords
- Lord Temporal
- Life peerage 6 February 2025

6th Deputy Mayor of London
- In office 13 May 2015 – 9 May 2016
- Mayor: Boris Johnson
- Preceded by: Victoria Borwick
- Succeeded by: Joanne McCartney

Leader of the Conservative Party in the London Assembly
- In office September 2008 – March 2011
- Preceded by: Richard Barnes
- Succeeded by: James Cleverly

Deputy Leader of the Conservative Party in the London Assembly
- In office September 2007 – September 2008
- Preceded by: Richard Barnes
- Succeeded by: Richard Tracey

Member of the London Assembly for Havering and Redbridge
- In office 4 May 2000 – 5 May 2016
- Preceded by: New constituency
- Succeeded by: Keith Prince
- Majority: 3,939

Personal details
- Born: 23 June 1964 (age 62) Rochdale, Lancashire, England
- Party: Conservative

Jeremy Roger Evans, Baron Evans of Guisborough (born 23 June 1964) is a British politician and life peer who served as Deputy Mayor of London under Boris Johnson from 2015 to 2016. A member of the Conservative Party, he represented Havering and Redbridge on the London Assembly from 2000 to 2016, during which time he also led the Conservative Group between 2008 and 2011. He previously served as a councillor in both the London Boroughs of Waltham Forest and Havering, and was leader of the Conservative Group on Waltham Forest Council from 1994 to 1998.

He was nominated for a life peerage in December 2024 and was created Baron Evans of Guisborough on 6 February 2025.

== Early life ==
Evans was born in Rochdale, Lancashire, and was brought up and educated in Guisborough, then in Cleveland.

He attended Laurence Jackson School and Prior Pursglove College, before graduating from the University of Sheffield.

Evans moved to London in 1987 and worked for Royal Mail for ten years. He later studied Law at the University of Westminster and trained as a barrister, being called to the bar by Middle Temple in 1997.

== Political career ==
=== London borough councillor ===
Evans was elected to Waltham Forest London Borough Council for the Valley ward (covering South Chingford) in 1990, 1994 and 1998.

During his time on the council he served as opposition spokesman on audit (1991) and housing (1992), deputy leader of the Conservative group (1993), and as Leader of the Conservative Group from 1994 to 1998.

He stood for Cann Hall ward in the 2002 Waltham Forest council election but was not elected.

In May 2006, Evans was elected to Havering London Borough Council for Elm Park and was re-elected in 2010.

He served as Chairman of the Regulatory Services (Planning) Committee between 2006 and 2008.

Evans did not contest the 2014 Havering council election.

=== Greater London Authority ===
Evans was first elected to the London Assembly for Havering and Redbridge in 2000 and retained his seat in the 2004, 2008 and 2012 elections. In the 2012 election he received 53,285 votes (37.59%) and he won against the Labour candidate Mandy Richards with a majority of 3,899 votes.

Until 2008 he served as the Conservative spokesman for transport and as Chairman of the Assembly’s Transport Committee, chairing reviews on industrial relations on the Underground, bus standards and congestion charging.

In September 2007, Evans was elected Deputy Leader of the Conservative group at City Hall. Following the 2008 London elections, which returned Boris Johnson as Mayor, he became Leader of the Conservative Group on the London Assembly in September 2008, a position he held until 2011.

During his later years on the Assembly he chaired the Online Crime Working Group, which published the report Tightening the Net: The Metropolitan Police Service’s response to online crime and theft in 2015.

He was appointed statutory Deputy Mayor of London on 13 May 2015, succeeding Victoria Borwick.

Evans retired from elected office in 2016 and subsequently worked as a public speaking coach.

== House of Lords ==
In December 2024, Evans was nominated for a life peerage as part of the 2024 Political Peerages. He was created Baron Evans of Guisborough, of Guisborough in the County of North Yorkshire, on 6 February 2025.

He delivered his maiden speech in the House of Lords on 13 June 2025 during a debate on AI and creative technologies, in which he emphasised outcome-focused regulation and reflected on his career progression from Guisborough to London.

== Selected committee work ==
- Chair, Transport Committee, London Assembly (2007).
- Chair, Online Crime Working Group (2014–2015), which produced the report Tightening the Net.
