= 1982 Waltham Forest London Borough Council election =

The 1982 Waltham Forest Council election took place on 6 May 1982 to elect members of Waltham Forest London Borough Council in London, England. The whole council was up for election, and the Labour Party lost overall control of the council to no overall control.

== Ward results ==
Cann Hall (3)
Party	Candidate	Votes	%
Liberal FT	Clyde Kitson	1,267	
Liberal FT	Christopher Millington	1,107	
Liberal FT	John G. Williams	1,066	
Labour	Dave Barnes	1,054	
Labour	Colin J Clavey	962	
Labour	Ashokkumar S Patel	924	
Conservative	Roy W Bennett	636	
Conservative	Timothy E B Leakey	554	
Conservative	Edward Riches	538	
Registered electors			
Turnout			
Rejected ballots			
Liberal FT gain from Labour		Swing	{{{swing}}}
Liberal FT gain from Labour		Swing	{{{swing}}}
Liberal FT gain from Labour		Swing	{{{swing}}}

Cathall (3)
Party	Candidate	Votes	%	±%

Chapel End (3)
Party	Candidate	Votes	%	±%

Chingford Green (3)
Party	Candidate	Votes	%	±%

Endlebury (2)
Party	Candidate	Votes	%	±%

Forest (3)
Party	Candidate	Votes	%	±%

Grove Green (3)
Party	Candidate	Votes	%	±%

Hale End (2)
Party	Candidate	Votes	%	±%

Hatch Lane (3)
Party	Candidate	Votes	%	±%

High Street (3)
Party	Candidate	Votes	%	±%

Higham Hill (2)
Party	Candidate	Votes	%	±%

Hoe Street (3)
Party	Candidate	Votes	%	±%

Larkswood (3)
Party	Candidate	Votes	%	±%

Lea Bridge (3)
Party	Candidate	Votes	%	±%

Leyton (3)
Party	Candidate	Votes	%	±%

Leytonstone (3)
Party	Candidate	Votes	%	±%

Lloyd Park (3)
Party	Candidate	Votes	%	±%

St James Street (3)
Party	Candidate	Votes	%	±%

Valley (3)
Party	Candidate	Votes	%	±%

Wood Street (3)
Party	Candidate	Votes	%	±%
