= Chingford Green (ward) =

Coordinates: 51.638°N 0.004°E

- Electoral ward for the Waltham Forest London Borough Council
- Borough: Waltham Forest
- County: Greater London
- Population: 11,401 (2021) (Note: 2021 Census data reported for 2022 ward boundaries)

Current electoral ward
- Created: 1978
- GSS code: E05013885

Chingford Green Ward is a political division of the London Borough of Waltham Forest and is one of the six Waltham Forest wards of the Chingford and Woodford Green Constituency represented by Iain Duncan Smith MP.

The ward is represented at the council by three councillors with elections every four years.

At the 2011 Census the population of the Ward was 10,287.

== Politics ==
Approximate result in this ward for 2010 general election

Party	Votes	%
Conservative Party	3152	65%
Labour Party	880	16%
Liberal Democrat	964	19%
Conservative majority	2188	47%

Approximate result in this ward for 2006 general election

Party	Votes	%
Conservative Party	2288	71%
Labour Party	357	11%
Liberal Democrat	605	18%
Conservative majority	1683	52%

== Waltham Forest council elections ==
=== 2022 election ===
Chingford Green (3)
Party	Candidate	Votes	%	±%
Conservative	Mitchell Goldie	2,348	67.1	
Conservative	Kay Isa	2,130	60.9	
Conservative	Sazimet Imre	2,039	58.3	
Labour Co-op	Rehana Ali-Rahman	1,013	28.9	
Labour Co-op	Nathan Burns	985	28.1	
Labour Co-op	Nigel Large	879	25.1	
Green	Craig Bayne	551	15.7	
Liberal Democrats	Henry Boyle	406	11.6	
Reform	Matt Davis	150	4.3	
Turnout			43.2	
Conservative hold				
Conservative hold				
Conservative hold				

=== 2018 election ===
The councillors elected in the 2018 election were Nick Halebi, (Conservative), Andy Hemsted, (Conservative) and Kay Isa, (Conservative).

Chingford Green (3)
Party	Candidate	Votes	%	±%
Conservative	Andy Hemsted	2,185	61.3	
Conservative	Kay Isa	2,133	59.8	
Conservative	Nick Halebi	2,113	59.3	
Labour	Kieran Falconer	967	27.1	
Labour	Shameem Katharina Alexandra Highfield	924	25.9	
Labour	Anton Ian Noel Lyons	860	24.1	
Green	Miranda James	474	13.3	
Liberal Democrats	Joan Margaret Carder	270	7.6	
Liberal Democrats	Jennifer Elizabeth Sullivan	213	6.0	
Turnout			43.58%	
Majority		1,146		
Conservative hold		Swing		
Conservative hold		Swing		
Conservative hold		Swing		
