= High Street (ward) =

Electoral ward in the London Borough of Waltham Forest

- Electoral ward for the Waltham Forest London Borough Council
- Borough: Waltham Forest
- County: Greater London
- Population: 11,564 (2021) (Note: 2021 Census data reported for 2022 ward boundaries)

Current electoral ward
- Created: 1965
- GSS code: E05013891

High Street is an electoral ward in the London Borough of Waltham Forest.

== Waltham Forest council elections ==
=== 2022 election ===
The election took place on 5 May 2022.

High Street (3)
| Party | Candidate | Votes | % | ±% |
|---|---|---|---|---|
| Labour | Crystal Ihenachor | 1,547 | 70.4 | |
| Labour | Tom Connor | 1,531 | 69.6 | |
| Labour | Raja Anwar | 1,521 | 69.2 | |
| Green | Abigail Woodman | 712 | 32.4 | |
| Liberal Democrats | Katherine Pollard | 255 | 11.6 | |
| TUSC | Nancy Taaffe | 174 | 7.9 | |
| Liberal Democrats | Robert Cocking | 168 | 7.6 | |
| Conservative | Munish Chopra-Evans | 161 | 7.3 | |
| Conservative | Muhammad Khan | 152 | 6.9 | |
| Conservative | Hasnain Latif | 143 | 6.5 | |
| Liberal Democrats | Jan-Dinant Schreuder | 135 | 6.1 | |
| TUSC | Nathan Wallace-Esnard | 98 | 4.5 | |
| Turnout | | | 30.8 | |
| Labour hold | | | | |
| Labour hold | | | | |
| Labour hold | | | | |

=== 2018 elections ===
The election took place on 3 May 2018.

High Street (3)
| Party | Candidate | Votes | % | ±% |
|---|---|---|---|---|
| Labour | Clare Coghill | 2,629 | 68.9 | |
| Labour | Raja Anwar | 2,354 | 61.7 | |
| Labour | Liaquat Ali | 2,160 | 56.6 | |
| Green | Andrew David Johns | 804 | 21.1 | |
| Liberal Democrats | Ciara Mary Simmons | 374 | 9.8 | |
| Liberal Democrats | Sally Burnell | 361 | 9.5 | |
| Liberal Democrats | Rory Matthew Fitzgerald | 358 | 9.4 | |
| Conservative | Richard Keough | 303 | 7.9 | |
| TUSC | Nancy Taafe | 297 | 7.8 | |
| Conservative | Henryka Gibbons | 289 | 7.6 | |
| Conservative | Adenike Akinbusoye | 263 | 6.9 | |
| London Independent Network | James Martin O'Rourke | 259 | 6.8 | |
| TUSC | Marvin Isaac Harris Hay | 242 | 6.3 | |
| Turnout | | | 37.02% | |
| Majority | | 1,356 | | |
| Labour hold | | Swing | | |
| Labour hold | | Swing | | |
| Labour hold | | Swing | | |

=== 2014 election ===
The election took place on 22 May 2014.

High Street
| Party | Candidate | Votes | % |
|---|---|---|---|
| Labour | Clare Coghill | 2,510 | 22% |
| Labour | Raja Anwar | 2,191 | 19% |
| Labour | Liaquat Ali | 2,095 | 18% |
| Liberal Democrats | Mahmood Hussain | 741 | 7% |
| Liberal Democrats | Bob Wheatley | 708 | 6% |
| Green | Harry Greenfield | 708 | 6% |
| Liberal Democrats | Nelia Cetin | 618 | 5% |
| Conservative | Michael Bamber | 314 | 3% |
| Conservative | Rachel Wedderburn | 267 | 2% |
| Conservative | Shane Clapham | 251 | 2% |
| TUSC | Nancy Taaffe | 240 | 2% |
| TUSC | Marvin Hay | 195 | 2% |
| Independent | James O'Rourke | 163 | 1% |
| Independent | John Macklin | 155 | 1% |
| TUSC | Senan Uthayasenan | 152 | 1% |
| Turnout | | 11,328 | |
| Labour hold | | | |
| Labour hold | | | |
| Labour gain from Liberal Democrats | | | |

=== 2010 election ===
The election on 6 May 2010 took place on the same day as the United Kingdom general election.

High Street
| Party | Candidate | Votes | % |
|---|---|---|---|
| Labour | Liaquat Ali | 2,325 | |
| Labour | Clare Coghill | 2,180 | |
| Liberal Democrats | Mahmood Hussain | 2,045 | |
| Labour | Steve Terry | 1,932 | |
| Liberal Democrats | Johar Khan | 1,923 | |
| Liberal Democrats | James O'Rourke | 1,712 | |
| Green | Anna Lindstrom | 774 | |
| Conservative | Shaun Hexter | 507 | |
| Conservative | Rachel Wedderburn | 506 | |
| Conservative | Mike Vero | 488 | |
| Green | Kuan Phillips | 478 | |
| Independent | Aurangzaib Sharif | 157 | |
| Independent | Michael Gold | 110 | |
| Turnout | | | 58.7% |
| Labour hold | | | |
| Labour gain from Liberal Democrats | | | |
| Liberal Democrats hold | | | |

=== 2006 election ===
The election took place on 4 May 2006.

High Street
| Party | Candidate | Votes | % |
|---|---|---|---|
| Labour | Liaquat Ali | 1,472 | |
| Liberal Democrats | Johar Khan | 1,468 | |
| Liberal Democrats | James O'Rourke | 1,453 | |
| Liberal Democrats | Dave Raval | 1,372 | |
| Labour | Diana Murray | 1,349 | |
| Labour | Narinder Matharoo | 1,224 | |
| Green | Denethor House | 604 | |
| Conservative | Edward Stacey | 309 | |
| Conservative | John Moss | 269 | |
| Conservative | Rachel Wedderburn | 268 | |
| Socialist | Claire Buddle | 245 | |
| Turnout | | | 43.1% |
| Labour hold | | | |
| Liberal Democrats gain from Labour | | | |
| Liberal Democrats gain from Labour | | | |
