= Cathall (ward) =

Coordinates: 51.556°N 0.001°E

- Electoral ward for the Waltham Forest London Borough Council
- Cathall ward boundaries since 2022
- Borough: Waltham Forest
- County: Greater London
- Population: 10,483 (2021) (Note: 2021 Census data reported for 2022 ward boundaries)
- Electorate: 6,933 (2022)
- Major settlements: Cathall
- Area: 0.8908 square kilometres (0.3439 sq mi)

Current electoral ward
- Created: 1978
- Number of members: 1978–2022: 3; 2022–present: 2
- Councillors: Naheed Asghar; Jonathan O'Dea
- GSS code: E05000591 (2002–2022); E05013883 (2022–present)

Cathall is an electoral ward in the London Borough of Waltham Forest. The ward was first used in the 1978 elections. It returns councillors to Waltham Forest London Borough Council. There was a revision of ward boundaries in 2002 and 2022. The revision in 2022 reduced the number of councillors from three to two.

The population of this ward at the 2011 Census was 12,700.

== Waltham Forest council elections since 2022 ==
There was a revision of ward boundaries in Waltham Forest in 2022. Cathall lost territory to Cann Hall ward.

=== 2022 election ===
The election took place on 5 May 2022.

2022 Waltham Forest London Borough Council election: Cathall (2)
Party	Candidate	Votes	%	±%
Labour	Naheed Asghar	1,186	73.8	
Labour	Jonathan O'Dea	1,071	66.6	
Green	Lizzie Jarvis	364	22.6	
Conservative	Michael Buckworth	191	11.9	
Liberal Democrats	Michael Rodden	177	11.0	
Conservative	Mohammad Rana	158	9.8	
TUSC	Ricardo Joseph	68	4.2	
Turnout			24.9	
Labour hold				
Labour hold				

== 2002–2022 Waltham Forest council elections ==
Cathall ward boundaries from 2002 to 2022

There was a revision of ward boundaries in Waltham Forest in 2002.

=== 2018 election ===
The election took place on 3 May 2018.

2018 Waltham Forest London Borough Council election: Cathall (3)
Party	Candidate	Votes	%	±%
Labour Co-op	Naheed Asghar	1,996	77.6	
Labour Co-op	Terry Wheeler	1,887	73.4	
Labour Co-op	Jonathan O'Dea	1,863	72.4	
Green	Glyn Roberts	320	12.4	
Liberal Democrats	John Howard	231	9.0	
Conservative	Fatima Ahmad	219	8.5	
Liberal Democrats	Joan O'Brien	205	8.0	
Liberal Democrats	Clyde Kitson	194	7.5	
Conservative	Craig Moss	194	7.5	
Conservative	Zarif Isa	153	5.9	
TUSC	Scott Jones	76	3.0	
Duma Polska	Elzbieta Raza	50	1.9	
Turnout			31.94%	
Majority		1,543		
Labour hold		Swing		
Labour hold		Swing		
Labour hold		Swing		
