= Higham Hill (ward) =

- Electoral ward for the Waltham Forest London Borough Council
- Higham Hill ward boundaries since 2022
- Borough: Waltham Forest
- County: Greater London
- Population: 14,312 (2021) (Note: 2021 Census data reported for 2022 ward boundaries)
- Electorate: 9,600 (2022)
- Area: 3.138 square kilometres (1.212 sq mi)

Current electoral ward
- Created: 1965
- Number of members: 1965–1978: 3; 1978–2002: 2; 2002–present:3
- Councillors: Karen Bellamy; Kira Lewis; Shumon Ali-Rahman
- GSS code: E05013892

Higham Hill is an electoral ward in the London Borough of Waltham Forest. The ward has existed since the creation of the borough on 1 April 1965 and was first used in the 1964 elections. It returns three councillors to Waltham Forest London Borough Council. (Note: Two councillors were returned between 1978 and 2002). The ward was subject to boundary revisions in 1978, 2002 and 2022.

== Waltham Forest elections since 2022 ==
There was a revision of ward boundaries in Waltham Forest in 2022.

=== 2026 election ===
The election will take place on 7 May 2026.

2026 Waltham Forest London Borough Council election: Higham Hill (3)
Party	Candidate	Votes	%	±%
Labour	Shumon Ali-Rahman			
Labour	Karen Bellamy			
Labour	Kira Lewis			
Liberal Democrats	Alan Jones			
Liberal Democrats	Alex Marshall-Lewis			
Liberal Democrats	Kath Pollard			
Green				
TUSC				
Conservative				
Majority				
Turnout				

=== 2023 by-election ===
The by-election took place on 26 October 2023, following the resignation of Alistair Strathern.

2023 Higham Hill by-election
Party	Candidate	Votes	%	±%
Labour	Shumon Ali-Rahman	924	57.3	
Liberal Democrats	Alex Lewis	268	16.6	
Green	Abigail Woodman	198	12.3	
TUSC	Nancy Taaffe	144	8.9	
Conservative	Moufazzal Bhuiyan	78	4.8	
Majority		656	40.7	
Turnout		1,612		
Labour hold		Swing		

=== 2022 election ===
The election took place on 5 May 2022.

2022 Waltham Forest London Borough Council election: Higham Hill (3)
Party	Candidate	Votes	%	±%
Labour	Karen Bellamy	2,001	80.1	
Labour	Kira Lewis	1,775	71.0	
Labour	Alistair Strathern	1,673	67.0	
Green	Louise Ashcroft	662	26.5	
Liberal Democrats	Leticia Martinez	316	12.6	
Liberal Democrats	Ryan Kelly	262	10.5	
Liberal Democrats	Patrick Smith	230	9.2	
TUSC	Michael Cleverley	158	6.3	
Conservative	Humayun Ikram	150	6.0	
Conservative	Saima Islam	148	5.9	
Conservative	Ariba Sheikh	121	4.8	
Turnout			27.8	
Labour win (new boundaries)				
Labour win (new boundaries)				
Labour win (new boundaries)				
