= Valley (Waltham Forest ward) =

Electoral ward in London, England

- Electoral ward for the Waltham Forest London Borough Council
- Borough: London Borough of Waltham Forest
- County: Greater London
- Population: 14,084 (2021)
- Area: 2.191 km²

Current electoral ward
- Created: 1978
- Seats: 3

Valley is an electoral ward in the London Borough of Waltham Forest. The ward was first used in the 1978 elections and elects three councillors to Waltham Forest London Borough Council.

== Geography ==
The ward is located in the valley of the Dagenham Brook.

== Councillors ==
Election	Councillors		
2022	Afzal Akram (Conservative)	Jemma Hemsted (Conservative)	Elizabeth Baptiste (Labour)

== Elections ==
=== 2022 ===
Valley (3)
Party	Candidate	Votes	%	±%
Conservative	Afzal Akram	1,812	50.2	
Conservative	Jemma Hemsted	1,788	49.5	
Labour	Elizabeth Baptiste	1,755	48.6	
Conservative	Kimberley Tonner	1,746	48.4	
Labour	Sarah Chaney	1,673	46.4	
Labour	Neil Weeks	1,515	42.0	
Liberal Democrats	Joanna Loxton	203	5.6	
Liberal Democrats	Eric Heinze	172	4.8	
Liberal Democrats	Ipek Ozerim	163	4.5	
Turnout			38.5	
Conservative hold				
Conservative hold				
Labour hold				

== See also ==
- List of electoral wards in Greater London
