= Hoe Street =

Political division of Waltham Forest

Coordinates: 51.582°N 0.017°W

- Electoral ward for the Waltham Forest London Borough Council
- Hoe Street ward boundaries since 2022
- Borough: Waltham Forest
- County: Greater London
- Population: 14,276 (Note: 2021 Census data reported for 2022 ward boundaries)
- Electorate: 9,773 (2022)
- Major settlements: Walthamstow
- Area: 1.076 square kilometres (0.415 sq mi)

Current electoral ward
- Created: 1965
- Number of members: 3
- Councillors: Ahsan Khan; Miriam Mirwitch; Andrew Dixon
- GSS code: E05013893

Hoe Street is an electoral ward in the London Borough of Waltham Forest, United Kingdom. The ward has existed since the creation of the borough on 1 April 1965 and was first used in the 1964 elections. It returns three councillors to Waltham Forest London Borough Council.

== Waltham Forest council elections since 2022 ==
There was a revision of ward boundaries in Waltham Forest in 2022.

=== 2022 election ===
The election took place on 5 May 2022.

2022 Waltham Forest London Borough Council election: Hoe Street
Party	Candidate	Votes	%	±%
Labour Co-op	Miriam Mirwitch	2,206	73.6	
Labour Co-op	Ashan Khan	2,091	69.8	
Labour Co-op	Andrew Dixon	2,035	67.9	
Green	Stephen Lambert	964	32.2	
Liberal Democrats	Ciara Simmons	373	12.4	
Liberal Democrats	James Goodman	326	10.9	
TUSC	Paul Bell	299	10.0	
Conservative	Mary Ipadeola	244	8.1	
Conservative	Muhammad Irfan	236	7.9	
Conservative	Naila Mir	218	7.3	
Turnout			32.9	
Labour Co-op win (new boundaries)				
Labour Co-op win (new boundaries)				
Labour Co-op win (new boundaries)				

== 2002–2022 Waltham Forest council elections ==
Hoe Street ward boundaries from 2002 to 2022

There was a revision of ward boundaries in Waltham Forest in 2002.

=== 2018 election ===
The election took place on 3 May 2018.

2018 Waltham Forest London Borough Council election: Hoe Street
Party	Candidate	Votes	%	±%
Labour	Saima Mahmud	2,409	68.0	
Labour	Ahsan Khan	2,222	62.7	
Labour	Tom Connor	2,219	62.6	
Green	Stephen Lambert	736	20.8	
Conservative	Matthew Davis	395	11.1	
Conservative	Svetlana Holloway	357	10.1	
Conservative	Rachel Wedderburn	355	10.0	
Liberal Democrats	Letica Martinez	350	9.9	
Liberal Democrats	James Goodman	348	9.8	
Liberal Democrats	Thomas Addenbrooke	290	8.2	
TUSC	Paul Bell	281	7.9	
Turnout			36.26	
Majority		1,483		
Labour hold		Swing		
Labour hold		Swing		
Labour hold		Swing		

=== 2014 election ===
The election took place on 22 May 2014.

2018 Waltham Forest London Borough Council election: Hoe Street
Party	Candidate	Votes	%	±%
Labour	Saima Mahmud	2,279		
Labour	Mark Rusling	2,226		
Labour	Ahsan Khan	2,209		
Green	Stephen Lambert	580		
Green	David Hamilton	527		
Green	Anne Warrington	513		
Conservative	Jonathan Canty	375		
Conservative	Roger Hemsted	333		
Conservative	Pamela Jovcic	331		
TUSC	Paul Bell	198		
Liberal Democrats	Jahanara Azim	194		
Liberal Democrats	Peter Hatton	192		
Liberal Democrats	Zeliha Yilmaz	165		
Turnout		10,122		
Labour hold		Swing		
Labour hold		Swing		
Labour hold		Swing		

=== 2010 election ===
The election on 6 May 2010 took place on the same day as the United Kingdom general election.

2010 Waltham Forest London Borough Council election: Hoe Street
Party	Candidate	Votes	%	±%
Labour	Ahsan Khan	2,265		
Labour	Saima Mahmud	2,098		
Labour	Mark Rusling	2,096		
Liberal Democrats	Farooq Arif	1,542		
Liberal Democrats	Najm Anwar	1,425		
Green	Stephen Lambert	1,015		
Green	Elen Miles	915		
Liberal Democrats	Naseem Saleemi	913		
Green	Daniel Perrett	816		
Conservative	Dominic Gover	701		
Conservative	Roger Hemsted	699		
Conservative	Susan Herrington	681		
Turnout			58.9	
Labour hold		Swing		
Labour hold		Swing		
Labour hold		Swing		

=== 2006 election ===
The election took place on 4 May 2006.

2006 Waltham Forest London Borough Council election: Hoe Street
Party	Candidate	Votes	%	±%
Labour	Naz Sarkar	1,351		
Labour	Saima Mahmud	1,314		
Labour	Eric Sizer	1,286		
Green	Stephen Lambert	785		
Liberal Democrats	Jacqueline Tidmarsh	605		
Liberal Democrats	Daniel Pond	592		
Conservative	Sophia Khan	530		
Conservative	Tara Draper-Stumm	475		
Conservative	Timothy Croot	469		
Liberal Democrats	Richard Tidmarsh	399		
Turnout			34.7	
Labour hold		Swing		
Labour hold		Swing		
Labour hold		Swing		

=== 2004 by-election ===
The by election took place on 18 November 2004, following the death of Mohammed Nasim.

2004 Hoe Street by-election
Party	Candidate	Votes	%	±%
Labour	Arunes Sarkar	774	40.4	−1.1
Liberal Democrats	Mohammad Diwan	561	29.2	+13.1
Conservative	Graham Sinclair	299	15.6	−4.7
Green	Mark Dawes	199	10.4	−6.4
Socialist	Louise Thompson	85	4.4	−1.0
Majority		213	11.2	
Turnout		1,918	23.0	
Labour hold		Swing		

=== 2002 election ===
The election took place on 2 May 2002.

2002 Waltham Forest London Borough Council election: Hoe Street
Party	Candidate	Votes	%	±%
Labour	Sylvia Poulsen	1,143		
Labour	Mohammed Nasim	1,114		
Labour	Eric Sizer	1,105		
Conservative	Asghar Ali	559		
Conservative	Brian Clarke	529		
Conservative	Mohammad Malik	507		
Green	Stephen Lambert	463		
Liberal Democrats	Morwenna Blewett	443		
Liberal Democrats	Frank Blewett	408		
Green	Richard Burkett	404		
Green	Elena Sproston	382		
Liberal Democrats	Michael Harkin	373		
Socialist Alliance	Cecilia Prosper	148		
Turnout				
Labour win (new boundaries)				
Labour win (new boundaries)				
Labour win (new boundaries)				

== 1978–2002 Waltham Forest council elections ==
There was a revision of ward boundaries in Waltham Forest in 1978.
