= Wood Street (ward) =

Electoral ward in London, England

- Electoral ward for the Waltham Forest London Borough Council
- Borough: London Borough of Waltham Forest
- County: Greater London
- Population: 9,594 (2021)
- Area: 0.7456 km²

Current electoral ward
- Created: 1965
- Seats: 2 (since 2022); 3 (until 2022)

Wood Street is an electoral ward in the London Borough of Waltham Forest. The ward was first used in the 1964 elections and elects two councillors to Waltham Forest London Borough Council.

== Geography ==
The ward is named after the area of Wood Street.

== Councillors ==
Election	Councillors	
2022	Vicky Ashworth (Labour and Co-op)	Richard Sweden (Labour and Co-op)

== Elections ==
=== 2022 ===
Wood Street (2)
Party	Candidate	Votes	%	±%
Labour Co-op	Vicky Ashworth	1,782	86.0	
Labour Co-op	Richard Sweden	1,499	72.3	
Liberal Democrats	Tom Addenbrooke	313	15.1	
Conservative	Rupert Dougall	202	9.7	
TUSC	Mary Finch	181	8.7	
Conservative	Seyyed Naqvi	169	8.2	
Turnout			35.2	
Labour Co-op hold				
Labour Co-op hold				

== See also ==
- List of electoral wards in Greater London
