= Larkswood =

Electoral ward in London, England

- Electoral ward for the Waltham Forest London Borough Council
- Borough: London Borough of Waltham Forest
- County: Greater London
- Population: 13,535 (2021)
- Area: 2.180 km²

Current electoral ward
- Created: 1978
- Seats: 3

Larkswood is an electoral ward in the London Borough of Waltham Forest. The ward was first used in the 1978 elections and elects three councillors to Waltham Forest London Borough Council.

== Geography ==
The ward is named after the area of Larkswood.

== Councillors ==
Election	Councillors		
2022	Sam O'Connell (Conservative)	John Moss (Conservative)	Catherine Saumarez (Conservative)

== Elections ==
=== 2022 ===
Larkswood (3)
Party	Candidate	Votes	%	±%
Conservative	Sam O'Connell	1,690	51.1	
Conservative	John Moss	1,663	50.3	
Conservative	Catherine Saumarez	1,647	49.8	
Labour	Beatrice Stern	1,207	36.5	
Labour	Bilal Mahmood	1,108	33.5	
Labour	Moynul Hussain	1,095	33.1	
Independent	Tom Quigley	581	17.6	
Green	Carina Millstone	512	15.5	
Liberal Democrats	Mahmood Faiz	241	7.3	
TUSC	Lily Douglas	114	3.4	
Reform	Richard King	70	2.1	
Turnout			38.1	
Conservative hold				
Conservative hold				
Conservative hold				

== See also ==
- List of electoral wards in Greater London
