= Lea Bridge (Waltham Forest ward) =

Electoral ward in the London borough of Waltham Forest

- Electoral ward for the Waltham Forest London Borough Council
- Lea Bridge (Waltham Forest) ward boundaries since 2022
- Borough: Waltham Forest
- County: Greater London
- Population: 14,125 (2021) (Note: 2021 Census data reported for 2022 ward boundaries)
- Electorate: 9,860 (2022)
- Major settlements: Lea Bridge
- Area: 2.491 square kilometres (0.962 sq mi)

Current electoral ward
- Created: 1965
- Number of members: 3
- Councillors: Jennifer Whilby; Shabana Dhedhi; Gerry Lyons
- GSS code: E05009380

Lea Bridge is an electoral ward in the London Borough of Waltham Forest. The ward has existed since the creation of the borough on 1 April 1965 and was first used in the 1964 elections. It returns three councillors to Waltham Forest London Borough Council. The ward was subject to boundary revisions in 1978, 2002 and 2022.

== Waltham Forest council elections since 2022 ==
There was a revision of ward boundaries in Waltham Forest in 2022.

=== 2022 election ===
The election took place on 5 May 2022.

2022 Waltham Forest London Borough Council election: Lea Bridge
Party	Candidate	Votes	%	±%
Labour	Shabana Dhedhi	1,892	77.9	
Labour	Jennifer Whilby	1,889	77.8	
Labour	Gerry Lyons	1,627	67.0	
Independent	Solene Fabios	920	37.9	
Conservative	Maqsoom Hussain	269	11.1	
Conservative	Muhammad Shaikh	242	10.0	
Conservative	Muhammad Zafar	226	9.3	
TUSC	Ben Robinson	217	8.9	
Turnout			28.5	
Labour win (new boundaries)				
Labour win (new boundaries)				
Labour win (new boundaries)				

== 2002–2022 Waltham Forest council elections ==
There was a revision of ward boundaries in Waltham Forest in 2002.

=== 2021 by-election ===
The by-election took place on 10 June 2021, following the resignation of Yemi Osho.

2021 Lea Bridge by-election
Party	Candidate	Votes	%	±%
Labour	Jennifer Whilby	1,176	50.0	−8.6
Independent	Claire Weiss	441	18.8	+18.8
Conservative	Sazimet Imre	436	18.6	+8.3
Green	RoseMary Warrington	181	7.7	−9.0
Liberal Democrats	Naomi McCarthy	116	4.9	−1.5
Majority		735	31.3	
Turnout		2,350		
Labour hold		Swing		

=== 2018 election ===
The election took place on 3 May 2018.

2018 Waltham Forest London Borough Council election: Lea Bridge
Party	Candidate	Votes	%	±%
Labour Co-op	Masood Ahmad	2,313	70.2	
Labour Co-op	Yemi Osho	2,131	64.6	
Labour Co-op	Mohammad Asghar	2,036	61.8	
Green	Rachel Barrat	660	20.0	
Conservative	Elliot Burton	408	12.4	
Conservative	Irfan Khadim	262	7.9	
Liberal Democrats	Jemima Miah	252	7.6	
Liberal Democrats	Zeshan Ahmed	240	7.3	
Conservative	Mohammed Shaikh	222	6.7	
TUSC	Martin Reynolds	214	6.5	
Liberal Democrats	Waqas Qureshi	175	5.3	
Duma Polska	Beata Gajos	97	2.9	
Turnout			32.12	
Majority		1,376		
Labour Co-op hold		Swing		
Labour Co-op hold		Swing		
Labour Co-op hold		Swing		

=== 2014 election ===
The election took place on 22 May 2014.

=== 2010 election ===
The election on 6 May 2010 took place on the same day as the United Kingdom general election.

=== 2006 election ===
The election took place on 4 May 2006.

=== 2002 election ===
The election took place on 2 May 2002.

== 1978–2002 Waltham Forest council elections ==
There was a revision of ward boundaries in Waltham Forest in 1978.

=== 1998 election ===
The election on 7 May 1998 took place on the same day as the 1998 Greater London Authority referendum.

=== 1994 election ===
The election took place on 5 May 1994.

=== 1990 election ===
The election took place on 3 May 1990.

=== 1986 election ===
The election took place on 8 May 1986.

=== 1982 election ===
The election took place on 6 May 1982.

=== 1978 election ===
The election took place on 4 May 1978.

== 1964–1978 Waltham Forest council elections ==
=== 1974 election ===
The election took place on 2 May 1974.

=== 1971 election ===
The election took place on 13 May 1971.

=== 1968 election ===
The election took place on 9 May 1968.

=== 1964 election ===
The election took place on 7 May 1964.
