= Leytonstone (ward) =

Electoral ward in London, England

- Electoral ward for the Waltham Forest London Borough Council
- Borough: London Borough of Waltham Forest
- County: Greater London
- Population: 12,238 (2021)
- Major settlements: Leytonstone
- Area: 1.311 km²

Current electoral ward
- Created: 1965
- Seats: 3

Leytonstone is an electoral ward in the London Borough of Waltham Forest. The ward was first used in the 1964 elections and elects three councillors to Waltham Forest London Borough Council.

== Geography ==
The ward is named after the area of Leytonstone.

== Councillors ==
| Election | Councillors | | |
|---|---|---|---|
| 2022 | Jenny Gray (Labour) | Clyde Loakes (Labour) | Marie Pye (Labour) |

== Elections ==
=== 2022 ===
Leytonstone
| Party | Candidate | Votes | % | ±% |
|---|---|---|---|---|
| Labour | Jenny Gray | 1,886 | 65.3 | |
| Labour | Clyde Loakes | 1,881 | 65.1 | |
| Labour | Marie Pye | 1,778 | 61.6 | |
| Green | Charlotte Lafferty | 557 | 19.3 | |
| Green | Mark Dawes | 523 | 18.1 | |
| Green | Rosemary Warrington | 482 | 16.7 | |
| Conservative | Matthew Bowden | 285 | 9.9 | |
| Conservative | Shenice Adams | 283 | 9.8 | |
| Conservative | Shahamima Khan | 252 | 8.7 | |
| Liberal Democrats | Sadia Mirza | 223 | 7.7 | |
| Liberal Democrats | Roger Harrison | 196 | 6.8 | |
| Liberal Democrats | David McCarthy | 196 | 6.8 | |
| TUSC | Len Hockey | 65 | 2.3 | |
| TUSC | Maria Talaia | 59 | 2.0 | |
| Turnout | | | 32.7 | |
| Labour hold | | | | |
| Labour hold | | | | |
| Labour hold | | | | |

== See also ==
- List of electoral wards in Greater London
