= 2026 Waltham Forest London Borough Council election =

2026 English local government election

- 7 May 2026

All 60 seats to Waltham Forest London Borough Council 31 seats needed for a majority
- Turnout: 42.08%
	First party	Second party	Third party
Leader	(Note: Paul Perkins and Eva Tabbasam were selected as joint leaders of the Green group following the election, and stated their intention to alternate as council leader every year, Perkins serving as the initial council leader..)	Grace Williams	Emma Best
Party	Green	Labour	Conservative
Last election	0 seats, 7.5%	47 seats, 59.2%	13 seats, 22.2%
Seats won	31	15	14
Seat change	▲31	▼32	▲1
Popular vote	81,553	71,284	34,121
Percentage	37.2%	32.6%	15.6%
Swing	▲29.7%	▼26.6%	▼6.6%
- Map of the results
Leader before election
Grace Williams
Labour
Leader after election
Paul Perkins
Green

The 2026 Waltham Forest London Borough Council election took place on 7 May 2026. All 60 members of Waltham Forest London Borough Council were elected. The elections took place alongside local elections in the other London boroughs and elections to local authorities across the United Kingdom.

Prior to the election, the council was under Labour majority control. At the election, the Green Party, which had not held any seats on the council immediately before the election, won 31 of the council's 60 seats, giving Waltham Forest Green Party a majority. The Greens subsequently appointed Paul Perkins and Eva Tabbasam as co-leaders of the group and set out a leadership model for them to each take turns as leader of the council in alternate years, starting with Perkins. He was accordingly formally appointed as the leader of the council at the subsequent annual council meeting on 21 May 2026.

== Background ==
The thirty-two London boroughs were established in 1965 by the London Government Act 1963. They are the principal authorities in Greater London and have responsibilities including education, housing, planning, highways, social services, libraries, recreation, waste, environmental health and revenue collection. Some of the powers are shared with the Greater London Authority, which also manages passenger transport, police and fire.

Since its formation, Waltham Forest has generally been under Labour control or no overall control with one period of Conservative control from 1968 to 1971. Labour won an overall majority from no overall control in the 2010 election, with 36 seats and 38.9% of the vote across the borough; with the Conservatives winning eighteen seats and the Liberal Democrats winning the remaining six. The Liberal Democrats lost all their seats in the 2014 election, with Labour winning 44 and the Conservatives winning 16. In 2018, Labour increased its majority with 46 seats to the Conservatives' 14. In the most recent election in 2022, Labour again extended its majority by winning 47 seats with 59.2% of the vote across the borough while the Conservatives won 13 seats with 22.2% of the vote. The Green Party received 7.5% of the vote and the Liberal Democrats received 7.4% of the vote but neither won any seats.

== Previous council composition ==
Council composition after the 2022 election

After 2022 election		Before 2026 election		After 2026 election	
Party	Seats	Party	Seats	Party	Seats
Green	0	Green	0	Green	31
Labour	47	Labour	44	Labour	15
Conservative	13	Conservative	10	Conservative	14
Reform	0	Reform	3	Reform	0
Independent	0	Independent	3	Independent	0

Changes 2022–2026:

- May 2022: Anna Mbachu re-elected as a Labour candidate, but sits as an independent after being expelled in April 2022
- September 2023: Alistair Strathern (Labour) resigns – by-election held October 2023
- October 2023: Shumon Ali-Rahman (Labour) wins by-election
- January 2025: Tom Connor (Labour) suspended from party
- September 2025: Justin Halabi (Conservative) joins Reform
- January 2026:
  - Marion Fitzgerald (Conservative) and Tim James (Conservative) join Reform
  - Rhiannon Eglin (Labour) leaves party to sit as an independent

== Results summary ==
2026 Waltham Forest London Borough Council election
Party	Seats	Gains	Losses	Net gain/loss	Seats %	Votes %	Votes	+/−
Green	31	31	0	▲31	51.7	37.2	81,553	+29.7
Labour	15	0	32	▼32	25.0	32.6	71,284	-26.6
Conservative	14	1	0	▲1	23.3	15.6	34,121	-6.6
Reform	0	0	0	Steady	0.0	6.5	14.165	+6.3
Liberal Democrats	0	0	0	Steady	0.0	4.3	9,322	-3.1
Independent	0	0	0	Steady	0.0	2.8	6,096	+1.7
Waltham Forest Independent Socialists	0	0	0	Steady	0.0	0.6	1,360	New
TUSC	0	0	0	Steady	0.0	0.4	952	-1.7
Your Party	0	0	0	Steady	0.0	0.05	108	New

== Results by ward ==
=== Cann Hall ===
Cann Hall (3)
Party	Candidate	Votes	%	±%
Green	Eva Tabbasam	1,970	52.6	▲27.7
Green	Tom Hainge	1,951	52.1	N/A
Green	Peter Richardson	1,900	50.7	N/A
Labour	Kischa Green	1,323	35.3	▼40.5
Labour	Sally Littlejohn	1,318	35.2	▼37.8
Labour	Keith Rayner	1,141	30.4	▼34.8
Reform	Terry Noon	287	7.7	N/A
Reform	Robin Williams	283	7.6	N/A
Liberal Democrats	Sally Burnell	219	5.8	▼8.2
Conservative	Chris Hill-Davies	209	5.6	▼5.4
Conservative	Mike Lang	180	4.8	▼6.2
Conservative	Ian Slater	164	4.4	▼4.3
Liberal Democrats	Philip Hawker	159	4.2	▼7.5
Liberal Democrats	Attila Gurbuz	141	3.8	N/A
Turnout			36.86	+10.86
Green gain from Labour		Swing	34.1	
Green gain from Labour		Swing	34.1	
Green gain from Labour		Swing	34.1	

=== Cathall ===
Cathall (2)
Party	Candidate	Votes	%	±%
Green	Rachel Barrat	872	41.1	▲18.5
Labour	Aisha Abubakar	832	39.2	▼34.6
Labour	Naheed Asghar	785	37.0	▼29.6
Green	Thomas MacInnes	728	34.3	N/A
Reform	Carol Vickery	181	8.5	N/A
Waltham Forest Independent Socialists	Susan Catten	144	6.8	N/A
Conservative	Vincent John	132	6.2	▼5.7
Conservative	Rita Moore	125	5.9	▼3.9
Waltham Forest Independent Socialists	Connor Rosoman	123	5.8	N/A
Liberal Democrats	Robert Cocking	122	5.8	▼5.2
Liberal Democrats	Nicola McGregor	118	5.6	N/A
Independent	Shaukat Ali	80	3.8	N/A
Turnout			31.63	+6.73
Green gain from Labour		Swing	26.6	
Labour hold				

=== Chapel End ===
Chapel End (3)
Party	Candidate	Votes	%	±%
Green	Layla Rosa	1,808	46.3	▲14.9
Green	Sue Wheat	1,784	45.7	N/A
Green	Luke Glazzard	1,744	44.6	N/A
Labour Co-op	Louise Mitchell	1,688	43.2	▼29.6
Labour Co-op	Paul Douglas	1,562	40.0	▼24.8
Labour Co-op	Steve Terry	1,407	36.0	▼21.5
Reform	Marcello Boljevic	349	8.9	N/A
Liberal Democrats	Joe Higgs	302	7.7	▼6.0
Conservative	Zainab Akram	255	6.5	▼4.7
Conservative	Samina Maqsoom	212	5.4	▼4.9
Conservative	Muhammad Inam	205	5.2	▼4.6
Liberal Democrats	Ipek Ozerim	158	4.0	▼4.6
Liberal Democrats	Dino Schreuder	155	4.0	▼2.5
TUSC	Mike Cleverley	94	2.4	▼4.5
Turnout			41.48	+9.48
Green gain from Labour		Swing	22.3	
Green gain from Labour		Swing	22.3	
Green gain from Labour		Swing	22.3	

=== Chingford Green ===
Chingford Green (3)
Party	Candidate	Votes	%	±%
Conservative	Mitchell Goldie	2,696	62.8	▼4.3
Conservative	Kay Isa	2,468	57.5	▼3.4
Conservative	Kelly Summers	2,419	56.4	▼1.9
Green	Mo Allen	733	17.1	▲1.4
Green	Kathryn Judd	615	14.3	N/A
Green	Kris Jack	611	14.2	N/A
Labour	Rehana Ali-Rahman	536	12.5	▼16.4
Labour	Stephen Roberts	514	12.0	▼16.1
Reform	Matt Davis	483	11.3	▲7.0
Reform	Francis Bray	471	11.0	N/A
Labour	Jimmy Sergi	452	10.5	▼14.6
Reform	Kimberley Tonner	437	10.2	N/A
Liberal Democrats	Henry Boyle	208	4.8	▼6.8
Liberal Democrats	Andrew Chipperfield	124	2.9	N/A
Liberal Democrats	Stephen James	111	2.6	N/A
Turnout			51.42	+8.22
Conservative hold				
Conservative hold				
Conservative hold				

=== Endlebury ===
Endlebury (2)
Party	Candidate	Votes	%	±%
Conservative	Roy Berg	1,709	57.5	▼3.8
Conservative	Emma Best	1,695	57.0	▼2.8
Green	Jake Smith	513	17.2	▲17.2
Green	Monica Sobiecki	451	15.2	N/A
Labour	Alison Cox	410	13.8	▼23.0
Reform	Lana Davis	390	13.1	▲11.0
Labour	Mark Ebden	334	11.2	▼19.9
Reform	Loiza Sitton	333	11.2	N/A
Liberal Democrats	Nigel Lea	114	3.8	▼2.5
Turnout			46.47	+5.87
Conservative hold				
Conservative hold				

=== Forest ===
Forest (3)
Party	Candidate	Votes	%	±%
Green	Simone McNichols-Thomas	2,401	56.6	▲32.5
Green	Yuksel Gonul	2,337	55.1	N/A
Green	Paul Perkins	2,332	55.0	N/A
Labour	Marsela Berberi	1,211	28.6	▼40.2
Labour	Zafran Malik	1,201	28.3	▼38.3
Labour	Kastriot Berberi	1,178	27.8	▼38.1
Reform	Muhammad Ali	315	7.4	N/A
Reform	Judy Hounsun	304	7.2	N/A
Reform	Asad Ishtiaq	275	6.5	N/A
Liberal Democrats	Fred Harrison	233	5.5	▼9.0
Conservative	Colin Mace	203	4.8	▼4.9
Conservative	Lauren Smith	186	4.4	▼5.1
Liberal Democrats	Jonathan Schutz	165	3.9	▼8.2
Liberal Democrats	Saif Ullah	142	3.3	▼7.3
Conservative	Mamad Jalloh	139	3.3	▼5.5
TUSC	Len Hockey	44	1.0	▼4.8
TUSC	Robert Harvey	34	0.8	▼2.7
TUSC	Maria Talaia	22	0.5	N/A
Turnout			40.60	+10.60
Green gain from Labour		Swing	36.4	
Green gain from Labour		Swing	36.4	
Green gain from Labour		Swing	36.4	

=== Grove Green ===
Grove Green (3)
Party	Candidate	Votes	%	±%
Green	Sarah Bentley	2,231	54.9	▲29.1
Green	Charlotte Lafferty	2,030	50.0	N/A
Green	Paul Treacy	1,828	45.0	N/A
Labour	Minnie Close	1,281	31.5	▼25.4
Labour	Khevyn Limbajee	1,242	30.6	▼26.3
Labour	Uzma Rasool	1,155	28.4	▼24.0
Liberal Democrats	Arran Angus	614	15.1	▼17.9
Liberal Democrats	Fiona Hamilton	497	12.2	▼16.7
Liberal Democrats	Naomi McCarthy	455	11.2	▼14.2
Reform	David Boulter	211	5.2	N/A
Reform	Malcolm Shykles	186	4.6	N/A
Conservative	Iona Berg	141	3.5	▼2.9
Conservative	Mike Smith	141	3.5	N/A
Conservative	Frank Boateng	128	3.2	N/A
TUSC	Robert Thomas	46	1.1	▼4.2
Turnout			42.70	+12.20
Green gain from Labour		Swing	27.3	
Green gain from Labour		Swing	27.3	
Green gain from Labour		Swing	27.3	

=== Hale End & Highams Park South ===
Hale End & Highams Park South (2)
Party	Candidate	Votes	%	±%
Labour	Tony Bell	1,384	44.2	▼10.5
Labour	Rosalind Doré	1,365	43.6	▼10.5
Green	Brian Capaloff	741	23.7	▲15.0
Green	Lukas Simma	686	21.9	N/A
Conservative	Dan Medlock	571	18.2	▼11.7
Conservative	Ruairidh Villar	458	14.6	▼9.8
Reform	Mary-Jane Florentin	407	13.0	N/A
Reform	Ricardo Allured	398	12.7	N/A
Liberal Democrats	Jeremy Gee	152	4.9	▲0.4
Independent	Hulya Ozturk	65	2.1	▼6.7
TUSC	Louise Cuffaro	35	1.1	0.0
Turnout			49.72	+2.72
Labour hold				
Labour hold				

=== Hatch Lane & Highams Park North ===
Hatch Lane & Highams Park North (3)
Party	Candidate	Votes	%	±%
Conservative	Shenise Adam	1,818	40.7	▼11.6
Conservative	Siobhan Wing	1,698	38.0	▼11.8
Conservative	Umar Ali	1,693	37.9	▼11.0
Green	Heather Gardiner	1,144	25.6	▲6.8
Green	Rory Fitzgerald	1,062	23.8	N/A
Labour	Catherine Burns	1,016	22.7	▼24.4
Green	Andrew McMullen	1,000	22.4	N/A
Labour	Daniel Brett	963	21.6	▼18.5
Labour	Ollie Welch	813	18.2	▼20.0
Reform	Marion Fitzgerald	679	15.2	N/A
Reform	Tim James	648	14.5	N/A
Reform	Catherine Mears	599	13.4	N/A
Liberal Democrats	Sadia Mirza	207	4.6	N/A
TUSC	Linda Taaffe	63	1.4	▼3.4
Turnout			47.72	+10.62
Conservative hold				
Conservative hold				
Conservative hold				

=== High Street ===
High Street (3)
Party	Candidate	Votes	%	±%
Green	Lisa Bryan	1,882	55.8	▲23.4
Green	John Donegan	1,759	52.1	N/A
Green	Marcelo Hart-Camus	1,708	50.6	N/A
Labour	Jeremy Cohen	1,262	37.4	▼33.0
Labour	Zia Rehman	1,182	35.0	▼34.6
Labour	Osaro Otobo	1,149	34.0	▼35.2
Reform	David Hook	178	5.3	N/A
Reform	Farah Anwar	162	4.8	N/A
Liberal Democrats	Nathan Hollow	147	4.4	▼7.2
Conservative	Amena Akter	135	4.0	▼3.3
Conservative	Samuel Martin	135	4.0	▼2.9
Reform	Anish Vithlani	135	4.0	N/A
Conservative	Idris Akram	128	3.8	▼2.7
Liberal Democrats	Graem Peters	108	3.2	▼4.4
TUSC	Nancy Taaffe	54	1.6	▼6.3
Turnout			41.92	+11.12
Green gain from Labour		Swing	28.2	
Green gain from Labour		Swing	28.2	
Green gain from Labour		Swing	28.2	

=== Higham Hill ===
Higham Hill (3)
Party	Candidate	Votes	%	±%
Green	Louise Ashcroft	1,486	44.9	▲18.4
Labour Co-op	Karen Bellamy	1,305	39.5	▼40.6
Green	Em Dean	1,251	37.8	N/A
Labour Co-op	Shumon Ali-Rahman	1,221	36.9	▼34.1
Labour Co-op	Kira Lewis	1,170	35.4	▼31.6
Green	Marco Hacon	1,148	34.7	N/A
Liberal Democrats	Alex Marshall-Lewis	382	11.6	▼1.0
Liberal Democrats	Alan Jones	376	11.4	▲0.9
Liberal Democrats	Kath Pollard	341	10.3	▲1.1
Reform	Cyril Cusack	337	10.2	N/A
Reform	Amber Ellmore-Payne	325	9.8	N/A
Conservative	Noreen Akram	215	6.5	▲0.5
Conservative	Atjaz Humayun	144	4.4	▼1.5
Conservative	Yousaff Khan	143	4.3	▼0.5
TUSC	Mary Finch	74	2.2	▼4.1
Turnout			35.74	+7.94
Green gain from Labour		Swing	29.5	
Labour hold				
Green gain from Labour		Swing	29.5	

=== Hoe Street ===
Hoe Street (3)
Party	Candidate	Votes	%	±%
Labour Co-op	Andrew Dixon	1,855	46.7	▼26.9
Labour Co-op	Miriam Mirwitch	1,840	46.3	▼27.3
Labour Co-op	Ahsan Khan	1,783	44.9	▼24.9
Green	Laura Pearce	1,729	43.5	▲11.3
Green	Ijaz Kato	1,613	40.6	N/A
Green	Hannaan Malik	1,583	39.8	N/A
Reform	Andrew Killin	260	6.5	N/A
Conservative	Anup Banik	213	5.4	▼2.7
Conservative	Raihaan Akhtar	204	5.1	▼2.8
Liberal Democrats	Ciara Simmons	182	4.6	▼7.8
Conservative	Adnin Mourin	168	4.2	▼3.1
Liberal Democrats	Jean-Francois Dor	167	4.2	▼6.7
Liberal Democrats	Jon Goddard	151	3.8	N/A
Your Party	Md Khan	108	2.7	N/A
TUSC	Ricardo Joseph	69	1.7	▼8.3
Turnout			41.39	+8.49
Labour hold				
Labour hold				
Labour hold				

=== Larkswood ===
Larkswood (3)
Party	Candidate	Votes	%	±%
Conservative	John Moss	1,525	39.6	▼10.7
Conservative	Catherine Saumarez	1,525	39.6	▼10.2
Conservative	Sam O'Connell	1,524	39.6	▼11.5
Independent	Sarah Chaney	1,078	28.0	N/A
Independent	Deborah Hollingsworth	962	25.0	N/A
Independent	Jennifer Larbie	951	24.7	N/A
Labour	Beatrice Stern	830	21.5	▼15.0
Labour	Frank Sweeney	711	18.5	▼15.0
Labour	Naveen Walgamage	670	17.4	▼15.7
Reform	Dan Green	525	13.6	▲11.5
Reform	Alex Fodor	514	13.3	N/A
Reform	Peter Hollingsworth	492	12.8	N/A
Liberal Democrats	Eric Heinze	250	6.5	▼0.8
Turnout			43.79	+5.69
Conservative hold				
Conservative hold				
Conservative hold				

Sarah Chaney, Deborah Hollingsworth and Jennifer Larbie are affiliated with the Chingford and Woodford Green Community Independents, associated with Faiza Shaheen.

=== Lea Bridge ===
Lea Bridge (3)
Party	Candidate	Votes	%	±%
Green	Liz Biggs	2,443	65.8	N/A
Green	Solène Fabios	2,325	62.7	N/A
Green	Rosie Rowlands	2,303	62.1	N/A
Labour	Shabana Dhedhi	1,087	29.3	▼48.6
Labour	Jennifer Whilby	984	26.5	▼51.3
Labour	George Minnah	950	25.6	▼41.4
Reform	Michael Dickens	235	6.3	N/A
Conservative	Hussain Foysal	180	4.9	▼6.2
Liberal Democrats	Harpreet Bhal	169	4.6	N/A
Conservative	Humayun Ikram	163	4.4	▼5.6
Liberal Democrats	Jim Williams	153	4.1	N/A
Conservative	Ariba Sheikh	140	3.8	▼5.5
Turnout			38.82	+10.32
Green gain from Labour		Swing	57.2	
Green gain from Labour		Swing	57.2	
Green gain from Labour		Swing	57.2	

=== Leyton ===
Leyton (3)
Party	Candidate	Votes	%	±%
Green	Daisy Richards	1,822	56.0	▲33.2
Green	Rob Gardner	1,799	55.3	▲32.5
Green	Demetrius Williams	1,657	50.9	N/A
Labour	Kyalo Burt-Fulcher	1,017	31.2	▼40.7
Labour	Whitney Ihenachor	930	28.6	▼37.4
Labour	Terry Wheeler	917	28.2	▼29.5
Liberal Democrats	Joe Dyer	263	8.1	▼12.3
Liberal Democrats	Asim Shahzad	256	7.9	▼9.5
Reform	Lorenzo Salemi	227	7.0	N/A
Liberal Democrats	Trevor Stone	215	6.6	▼7.4
Conservative	Kathy Berg	194	6.0	▼3.7
Conservative	Luke Berg	176	5.4	▼3.9
Conservative	Ed Clarke	161	4.9	▼2.7
TUSC	Imran Hussain	84	2.6	▼0.6
TUSC	Muhsin Manir	48	1.5	N/A
Turnout			34.41	+8.81
Green gain from Labour		Swing	36.9	
Green gain from Labour		Swing	36.9	
Green gain from Labour		Swing	36.9	

=== Leytonstone ===
Leytonstone (3)
Party	Candidate	Votes	%	±%
Labour	Clyde Loakes	1,815	50.1	▼15.0
Green	Denise Alder	1,767	48.8	▲29.5
Green	RoseMary Warrington	1,707	47.1	▲30.4
Labour	Jenny Gray	1,508	41.6	▼23.7
Labour	Marie Pye	1,463	40.4	▼21.2
Independent	Rhiannon Eglin	924	25.5	N/A
Reform	Stephen Routledge	279	7.7	N/A
Reform	Jaison Thomas	245	6.8	N/A
Conservative	Helen Johnson	223	6.2	▼3.7
Liberal Democrats	Elizabeth Binitie	222	6.1	▼1.6
Conservative	Beverley Goldie	208	5.7	▼4.1
Conservative	Nick Goldie	203	5.6	▼3.1
Liberal Democrats	Oliver Gregory	180	5.0	▼1.8
Liberal Democrats	Rylan Holey	121	3.3	▼3.5
Turnout			24.19	−8.51
Labour hold				
Green gain from Labour		Swing	22.2	
Green gain from Labour		Swing	22.2	

=== Markhouse ===
Markhouse (2)
Party	Candidate	Votes	%	±%
Labour	Johar Khan	1,368	51.4	▼23.4
Green	Chanté Johnson	1,170	43.9	▲43.9
Labour	Sharon Waldron	1,159	43.5	▼30.8
Green	Richard Wild	1,100	41.3	N/A
Conservative	Roger Hemsted	138	5.2	▼3.4
Liberal Democrats	Ed Bird	126	4.7	▼7.3
Reform	James Ellingham	119	4.5	N/A
Conservative	Faraz Rehman	108	4.1	▼3.9
TUSC	Adeel Aurangzeb	38	1.4	▼5.9
Turnout			43.13	+4.43
Labour hold				
Green gain from Labour		Swing	33.6	

=== St James ===
St James (3)
Party	Candidate	Votes	%	±%
Green	Anna Kerr	2,194	53.1	▲11.1
Green	David Berrie	2,169	52.5	N/A
Green	Martin Edobor	2,144	51.9	N/A
Labour Co-op	Catherine Deakin	1,766	42.7	▼34.0
Labour Co-op	Caz Scott	1,536	37.2	▼31.4
Labour Co-op	Nathan Burns	1,515	36.7	▼22.4
Reform	Jo Hulstrom	227	5.5	N/A
Conservative	Amna Asim	212	5.1	▼1.8
Liberal Democrats	Nick Martlew	167	4.0	▼6.2
Conservative	Anmol Seher	149	3.6	▼3.2
Conservative	Shaikh Mumtaz	129	3.1	▼2.3
Liberal Democrats	Giuseppe Mauro	123	3.0	N/A
TUSC	Martin Reynolds	66	1.6	▼9.8
Turnout			45.77	+12.57
Green gain from Labour		Swing	22.5	
Green gain from Labour		Swing	22.5	
Green gain from Labour		Swing	22.5	

=== Upper Walthamstow ===
Upper Walthamstow (2)
Party	Candidate	Votes	%	±%
Labour Co-op	Caramel Quin	1,290	51.4	▼13.6
Labour Co-op	Yusuf Patel	1,162	46.3	▼11.2
Green	Lyssa Barber	828	33.0	▲11.6
Green	Rbeeza Mobeen	749	29.9	N/A
Conservative	Samuel Clark	222	8.9	▼11.9
Reform	James Howe	221	8.8	N/A
Reform	Michaela Steele	205	8.2	N/A
Conservative	Md Bhuiyan	164	6.5	▼12.0
Liberal Democrats	Jane Morgan	137	5.5	▼5.6
TUSC	Lee Hawksbee	37	1.5	▼2.0
Turnout			43.67	+5.87
Labour hold				
Labour hold				

=== Valley ===
Valley (3) (Note: The Green Party are standing down in this ward in support of the Chingford and Woodford Green Community Independents.)
Party	Candidate	Votes	%	±%
Conservative	Afzal Akram	1,687	43.4	▼6.8
Conservative	Jemma Hemsted	1,583	40.7	▼8.8
Conservative	Toby Garrett	1,552	39.9	▼8.5
Labour	Elizabeth Baptiste	1,084	27.9	▼20.7
Labour	Bella Callow-Robinson	981	25.2	▼21.2
Labour	Gerry Lyons	898	23.1	▼18.9
Reform	Bob Auger	655	16.9	N/A
Reform	David Axe	642	16.5	N/A
Independent	Saqeeb Howlader	605	15.6	N/A
Independent	Simon Deville	581	15.0	N/A
Independent	Matt Romo	571	14.7	N/A
Reform	Sorin Cioriciu	534	13.7	N/A
Liberal Democrats	Faiz Faiz	285	7.3	▲1.7
Turnout			32.93	−5.57
Conservative hold				
Conservative hold				
Conservative gain from Labour		Swing	6.9	

Simon Deville, Saqeeb Howlader and Matt Romo are affiliated with the Chingford and Woodford Green Community Independents, associated with Faiza Shaheen.

=== William Morris ===
William Morris (3)
Party	Candidate	Votes	%	±%
Labour Co-op	Kizzy Gardiner	2,145	49.8	▼33.3
Labour Co-op	Grace Williams	2,089	48.5	▼31.7
Green	Ben Copsey	1,847	42.9	▲7.7
Labour Co-op	Jack Phipps	1,803	41.9	▼23.0
Green	Robyn Page	1,786	41.5	N/A
Green	Peter Kanyike	1,720	39.9	N/A
Reform	Joseph Alaba	242	5.6	N/A
Reform	Geraldine Selmour	234	5.4	N/A
Liberal Democrats	James Goodman	223	5.2	N/A
Conservative	Gillian Hemsted	208	4.8	▼5.4
Conservative	Hamza Ali	206	4.8	▼3.9
Conservative	Dean Wing	187	4.3	▼4.0
Liberal Democrats	Patrick Smith	160	3.7	N/A
TUSC	Kevin Parslow	69	1.6	▼7.6
Turnout			44.73	+9.73
Labour hold				
Labour hold				
Green gain from Labour		Swing	20.5	

=== Wood Street ===
Wood Street (2)
Party	Candidate	Votes	%	±%
Labour	Richard Sweden	1,284	42.9	▼43.1
Labour	Stephanie Talbut	1,270	42.4	▼29.9
Green	Charlie Loveday	1,249	41.7	N/A
Green	Samir Richards	1,143	38.2	N/A
Independent	Alex Muhumuza	279	9.3	N/A
Reform	Douglas Walker	183	6.1	N/A
Reform	Stewart Ware	161	5.4	N/A
Liberal Democrats	Gwilym Johnston	122	4.1	▼11.0
Conservative	Maqsoom Hussain	117	3.9	▼5.8
Conservative	Lorenc Hoxha	107	3.6	▼4.6
TUSC	Adrienne Wallace	40	1.3	▼7.4
TUSC	Ellen Peers	35	1.2	N/A
Turnout			46.01	+10.81
Labour hold				
Labour hold				
