= Emma Best (politician) =

British politician (born 1991)

Cllr Emma Best AM
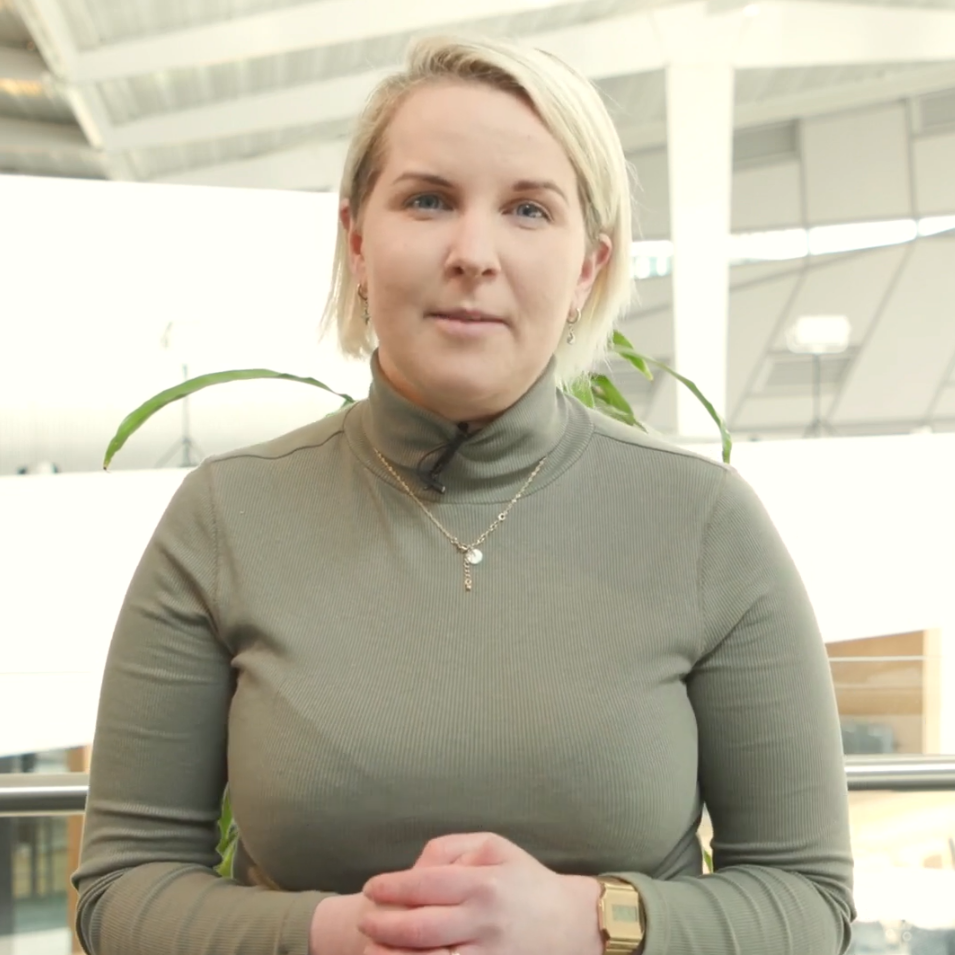
- Best in 2025

Deputy Leader of the Conservative Party in the London Assembly
- Incumbent
- Assumed office 2 May 2023
- Leader: Neil Garratt; Susan Hall
- Preceded by: Peter Fortune

Member of the London Assembly as an additional member
- Incumbent
- Assumed office 6 May 2021

Member of Waltham Forest London Borough Council
- Incumbent
- Assumed office 4 May 2018
- Preceded by: Peter Herrington
- Constituency: Endlebury

Member of Redbridge London Borough Council
- In office 23 May 2014 – 3 May 2018
- Preceded by: Richard Hoskins
- Succeeded by: Ward abolished
- Constituency: Church End

Personal details
- Born: 23 March 1991 (age 35) London, England
- Party: Conservative
- Website: emmabest.org.uk

Emma Dawn Best (born 23 March 1991) is a British politician who has been deputy leader of the Conservatives in the London Assembly since May 2023, and a member of the London Assembly (AM) as an additional member since 2021.

== Political career ==
She is currently a councillor on Waltham Forest Borough Council where she is Leader of the Conservative Group.

She served as a councillor in Redbridge for the Church End ward between 2014 and 2018.

In 2021, she stood in the North East London constituency, coming third. She was also on the party's London-wide list and elected through that.

In the 2018 Waltham Forest London Borough Council election, she was elected in Endlebury ward. She was re-elected in 2022 and 2026.

Best was elected as Deputy Leader of the London Assembly Conservative Group in May 2023.

== Political positions ==
Best is a proponent of electoral reform.

== Personal life ==
Best is openly gay.
