= 2022 Waltham Forest London Borough Council election =

2022 local election in Waltham Forest

- 5 May 2022

All 60 council seats
	First party	Second party
Leader	Grace Williams	Alan Siggers
Party	Labour	Conservative
Last election	46 seats, 58.1%	14 seats, 24.1%
Seats won	47	13
Seat change	▲1	▼1
Percentage	59.2%	22.2%
- Map of the results
Council control before election
Labour
Council control after election
Labour

The 2022 Waltham Forest London Borough Council election was held on 5 May 2022. All 60 members of Waltham Forest London Borough Council were elected. The elections took place alongside local elections in the other London boroughs and elections to local authorities across the United Kingdom. the Labour Party maintained its control of the council, winning 47 out of the 60 seats with the Conservative Party forming the council opposition with the remaining 13 seats.

== Background ==
=== History ===
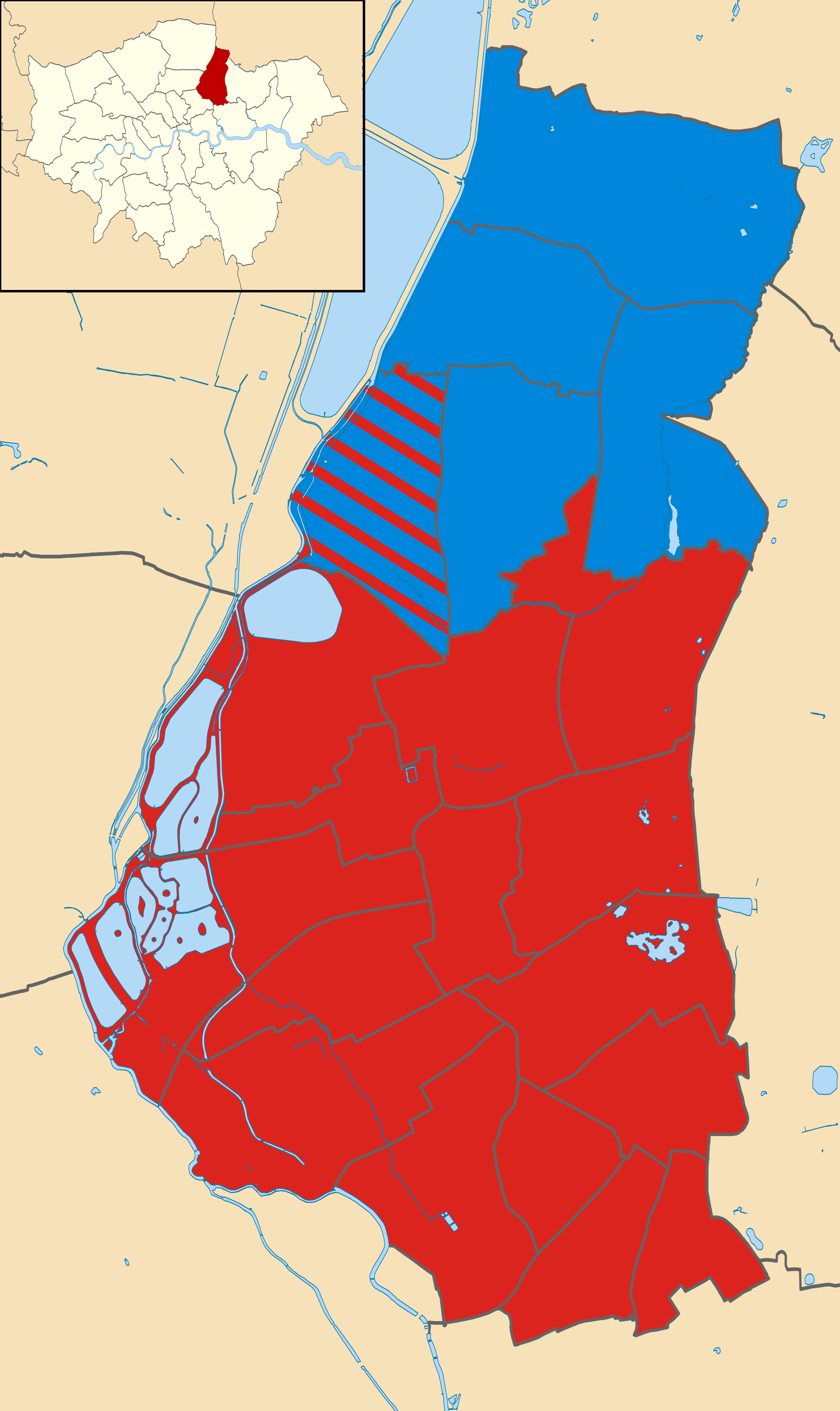
Result of the 2018 borough election

The thirty-two London boroughs were established in 1965 by the London Government Act 1963. They are the principal authorities in Greater London and have responsibilities including education, housing, planning, highways, social services, libraries, recreation, waste, environmental health and revenue collection. Some of the powers are shared with the Greater London Authority, which also manages passenger transport, police and fire.

Since its formation, Waltham Forest has generally been under Labour control or no overall control with one period of Conservative control from 1968 to 1971. Labour won an overall majority from no overall control in the 2010 election, with 36 seats and 38.9% of the vote across the borough; with the Conservatives winning eighteen seats and the Liberal Democrats winning the remaining six. The Liberal Democrats lost all their seats in the 2014 election, with Labour winning 44 and the Conservatives winning 16. In the most recent election in 2018, Labour extended its majority by winning 44 seats with 58.1% of the vote across the borough while the Conservatives won 14 seats with 24.1% of the vote. The Liberal Democrats received 10.3% of the vote and the Green Party received 5.5% of the vote but neither won any seats.

There were by-elections in 2021. Geoff Walker, a Conservative councillor for Hatch Lane who had served on the council for 26 years, died in March 2020. Due to the COVID-19 pandemic, a by-election to fill the seat was not held until 6 May 2021 alongside the 2021 London mayoral election and London Assembly election. The eventual by-election was won by the Conservative candidate Justin Halabi. Chris Robbins, a Labour councillor for Grove Green and a former council leader, died in April 2021. Yemi Osho, a Labour councillor for Lea Bridge, resigned in the same month. By-elections for both seats were held on 10 June 2021. Labour won both seats, with the teacher and researcher Uzma Rasool winning in Grove Green and the NHS worker Jennifer Whilby winning in Lea Bridge.

In 2021 new ward boundaries were established following review by the Local Government Boundary Commission for England. The number of councillors remain at sixty but the commission produced new boundaries following a period of consultation, with sixteen three-member wards and six two-member wards.

== Electoral process ==
Waltham Forest, like other London borough councils, elects all of its councillors at once every four years. The 2022 election was by multi-member first-past-the-post voting, with each ward being represented by two or three councillors. Electors had as many votes as there were councillors to be elected in their ward, with the top two or three being elected.

All registered electors (British, Irish, Commonwealth and European Union citizens) living in London aged 18 or over were entitled to vote in the election. People who lived at two addresses in different councils, such as university students with different term-time and holiday addresses, were entitled to be registered for and vote in elections for both local authorities. Voting in-person at polling stations took place from 7:00 to 22:00 on election day, and voters were able to apply for postal votes or proxy votes in advance of the election.

== Previous council composition ==
Council composition after the 2018 election

Council composition after the 2022 election

After 2018 election		After 2022 election	
Party	Seats	Party	Seats
Labour	46	Labour	47
Conservative	14	Conservative	13

== Results summary ==
2022 Waltham Forest London Borough Council election
Party	Seats	Gains	Losses	Net gain/loss	Seats %	Votes %	Votes	+/−
Labour	47	0	0	▲1	78.3	59.2	97,173	+1.1
Conservative	13	0	0	▼1	21.7	22.2	36,530	-1.9
Green	0	0	0	Steady	0.0	7.5	12,396	+2.0
Liberal Democrats	0	0	0	Steady	0.0	7.4	12,205	-2.9
TUSC	0	0	0	Steady	0.0	2.1	3,490	+0.7
Independent	0	0	0	Steady	0.0	1.1	1,804	+0.9
Women's Equality	0	0	0	Steady	0.0	0.2	404	New
Reform	0	0	0	Steady	0.0	0.2	274	New

== Ward results ==
=== Cann Hall ===
Cann Hall (3)
Party	Candidate	Votes	%	±%
Labour	Sally Littlejohn	1,943	75.8	
Labour	Kischa-Bianca Green	1,873	73.0	
Labour	Keith Rayner	1,671	65.2	
Green	Peter Richardson	639	24.9	
Liberal Democrats	Joan Carder	359	14.0	
Liberal Democrats	Suleman Ahmed	301	11.7	
Conservative	Henryka Gibbons	283	11.0	
Conservative	Otis Griffin	281	11.0	
Conservative	Eylem Kizil	224	8.7	
TUSC	Tim Stronge	118	4.6	
Turnout			26.0	
Labour hold				
Labour hold				
Labour hold				

=== Cathall ===
Cathall (2)
Party	Candidate	Votes	%	±%
Labour	Naheed Asghar	1,186	73.8	
Labour	Jonathan O'Dea	1,071	66.6	
Green	Lizzie Jarvis	364	22.6	
Conservative	Michael Buckworth	191	11.9	
Liberal Democrats	Michael Rodden	177	11.0	
Conservative	Mohammad Rana	158	9.8	
TUSC	Ricardo Joseph	68	4.2	
Turnout			24.9	
Labour hold				
Labour hold				

=== Chapel End ===
Chapel End (3)
Party	Candidate	Votes	%	±%
Labour Co-op	Louise Mitchell	2,101	72.8	
Labour Co-op	Paul Douglas	1,870	64.8	
Labour Co-op	Steve Terry	1,661	57.5	
Green	Susan Wheat	906	31.4	
Liberal Democrats	Beth Bramley	394	13.7	
Conservative	Gillian Hemsted	324	11.2	
Conservative	Roger Hemsted	298	10.3	
Conservative	Irfan Khadim	283	9.8	
Liberal Democrats	Alexander Lewis	249	8.6	
TUSC	Glenroy Watson	200	6.9	
Liberal Democrats	Martin Miller	188	6.5	
TUSC	Kenneth Driscoll	185	6.4	
Turnout			32.0	
Labour Co-op hold				
Labour Co-op hold				
Labour Co-op hold				

=== Chingford Green ===
Chingford Green (3)
Party	Candidate	Votes	%	±%
Conservative	Mitchell Goldie	2,348	67.1	
Conservative	Kay Isa	2,130	60.9	
Conservative	Sazimet Imre	2,039	58.3	
Labour Co-op	Rehana Ali-Rahman	1,013	28.9	
Labour Co-op	Nathan Burns	985	28.1	
Labour Co-op	Nigel Large	879	25.1	
Green	Craig Bayne	551	15.7	
Liberal Democrats	Henry Boyle	406	11.6	
Reform	Matt Davis	150	4.3	
Turnout			43.2	
Conservative hold				
Conservative hold				
Conservative hold				

=== Endlebury ===
Endlebury (2)
Party	Candidate	Votes	%	±%
Conservative	Roy Berg	1,568	61.3	
Conservative	Emma Best	1,529	59.8	
Labour	Sharon King	940	36.8	
Labour	Luke Willmoth	794	31.1	
Liberal Democrats	Nigel Lea	161	6.3	
TUSC	Sarah Sachs-Eldridge	66	2.6	
Reform	Robin Williams	54	2.1	
Turnout			40.6	
Conservative hold				
Conservative hold				

=== Forest ===
Forest (3)
Party	Candidate	Votes	%	±%
Labour	Marsela Berberi	2,045	68.8	
Labour	Zafran Malik	1,982	66.6	
Labour	Kastriot Berberi	1,961	65.9	
Green	Glyn Roberts	716	24.1	
Liberal Democrats	Josh Hadley	431	14.5	
Liberal Democrats	Justin Randle	361	12.1	
Liberal Democrats	Gavin Sallery	316	10.6	
Conservative	Sakarya Karamehmet	289	9.7	
Conservative	Ismet Karamehmet	284	9.5	
Conservative	Sema Karamehmet	262	8.8	
TUSC	Arshad Ahmad	172	5.8	
TUSC	Arnold Ssekandwa	103	3.5	
Turnout			30.0	
Labour hold				
Labour hold				
Labour hold				

=== Grove Green ===
Grove Green
Party	Candidate	Votes	%	±%
Labour	Khevyn Limbajee	1,615	56.9	
Labour	Anna Mbachu	1,516	53.4	
Labour	Uzma Rasool	1,487	52.4	
Liberal Democrats	Arran Angus	937	33.0	
Liberal Democrats	Naomi McCarthy	819	28.9	
Green	Maureen Measure	733	25.8	
Liberal Democrats	Joe Dyer	720	25.4	
Conservative	Kathleen Berg	182	6.4	
Conservative	Iona Berg	181	6.4	
Conservative	Luke Berg	171	6.0	
TUSC	Kevin Parslow	150	5.3	
Turnout			30.5	
Labour hold				
Labour hold				
Labour hold				

=== Hale End & Highams Park South ===
Hale End & Highams Park South
Party	Candidate	Votes	%	±%
Labour	Tony Bell	1,612	54.7	
Labour	Rosalind Dore	1,594	54.1	
Conservative	Kieran Cooke	881	29.9	
Conservative	Huma Stone	718	24.4	
Women's Equality	Christine Dean	404	13.7	
Independent	Ed Pond	260	8.8	
Green	Michael Holloway	257	8.7	
Liberal Democrats	Canan Nuri	132	4.5	
TUSC	James Ivens	32	1.1	
Turnout			47.0	
Labour win (new seat)				
Labour win (new seat)				

=== Hatch Lane & Highams Park North ===
Hatch Lane & Highams Park North
Party	Candidate	Votes	%	±%
Conservative	Marion Fitzgerald	1,732	52.3	
Conservative	Justin Halabi	1,651	49.8	
Conservative	Tim James	1,618	48.9	
Labour	Catherine Burns	1,561	47.1	
Labour	Daniel Fryd	1,328	40.1	
Labour	Zia Rehman	1,264	38.2	
Green	Robert Tatam	623	18.8	
TUSC	Louise Cuffaro	159	4.8	
Turnout			37.1	
Conservative win (new seat)				
Conservative win (new seat)				
Conservative win (new seat)				

=== High Street ===
High Street (3)
Party	Candidate	Votes	%	±%
Labour	Crystal Ihenachor	1,547	70.4	
Labour	Tom Connor	1,531	69.6	
Labour	Raja Anwar	1,521	69.2	
Green	Abigail Woodman	712	32.4	
Liberal Democrats	Katherine Pollard	255	11.6	
TUSC	Nancy Taaffe	174	7.9	
Liberal Democrats	Robert Cocking	168	7.6	
Conservative	Munish Chopra-Evans	161	7.3	
Conservative	Muhammad Khan	152	6.9	
Conservative	Hasnain Latif	143	6.5	
Liberal Democrats	Jan-Dinant Schreuder	135	6.1	
TUSC	Nathan Wallace-Esnard	98	4.5	
Turnout			30.8	
Labour hold				
Labour hold				
Labour hold				

=== Higham Hill ===
Higham Hill (3)
Party	Candidate	Votes	%	±%
Labour	Karen Bellamy	2,001	80.1	
Labour	Kira Lewis	1,775	71.0	
Labour	Alistair Strathern	1,673	67.0	
Green	Louise Ashcroft	662	26.5	
Liberal Democrats	Leticia Martinez	316	12.6	
Liberal Democrats	Ryan Kelly	262	10.5	
Liberal Democrats	Patrick Smith	230	9.2	
TUSC	Michael Cleverley	158	6.3	
Conservative	Humayun Ikram	150	6.0	
Conservative	Saima Islam	148	5.9	
Conservative	Ariba Sheikh	121	4.8	
Turnout			27.8	
Labour hold				
Labour hold				
Labour hold				

=== Hoe Street ===
Hoe Street
Party	Candidate	Votes	%	±%
Labour Co-op	Miriam Mirwitch	2,206	73.6	
Labour Co-op	Ashan Khan	2,091	69.8	
Labour Co-op	Andrew Dixon	2,035	67.9	
Green	Stephen Lambert	964	32.2	
Liberal Democrats	Ciara Simmons	373	12.4	
Liberal Democrats	James Goodman	326	10.9	
TUSC	Paul Bell	299	10.0	
Conservative	Mary Ipadeola	244	8.1	
Conservative	Muhammad Irfan	236	7.9	
Conservative	Naila Mir	218	7.3	
Turnout			32.9	
Labour Co-op hold				
Labour Co-op hold				
Labour Co-op hold				

=== Larkswood ===
Larkswood (3)
Party	Candidate	Votes	%	±%
Conservative	Sam O'Connell	1,690	51.1	
Conservative	John Moss	1,663	50.3	
Conservative	Catherine Saumarez	1,647	49.8	
Labour	Beatrice Stern	1,207	36.5	
Labour	Bilal Mahmood	1,108	33.5	
Labour	Moynul Hussain	1,095	33.1	
Independent	Tom Quigley	581	17.6	
Green	Carina Millstone	512	15.5	
Liberal Democrats	Mahmood Faiz	241	7.3	
TUSC	Lily Douglas	114	3.4	
Reform	Richard King	70	2.1	
Turnout			38.1	
Conservative hold				
Conservative hold				
Conservative hold				

=== Lea Bridge ===
Lea Bridge
Party	Candidate	Votes	%	±%
Labour	Shabana Dhedhi	1,892	77.9	
Labour	Jennifer Whilby	1,889	77.8	
Labour	Gerry Lyons	1,627	67.0	
Independent	Solene Fabios	920	37.9	
Conservative	Maqsoom Hussain	269	11.1	
Conservative	Muhammad Shaikh	242	10.0	
Conservative	Muhammad Zafar	226	9.3	
TUSC	Ben Robinson	217	8.9	
Turnout			28.5	
Labour hold				
Labour hold				
Labour hold				

=== Leyton ===
Leyton (3)
Party	Candidate	Votes	%	±%
Labour	Rhiannon Eglin	1,610	71.9	
Labour	Whitney Ihenachor	1,478	66.0	
Labour	Terry Wheeler	1,291	57.7	
Green	Rob Gardner	511	22.8	
Liberal Democrats	Shaukat Ali	456	20.4	
Liberal Democrats	Meera Chadha	390	17.4	
Liberal Democrats	Trevor Stone	313	14.0	
Conservative	Lauren Maske	217	9.7	
Conservative	Eliz Karamehmet	209	9.3	
Conservative	Ehsanullah Mohammed	170	7.6	
TUSC	Martin Reynolds	71	3.2	
Turnout			25.6	
Labour hold				
Labour hold				
Labour hold				

=== Leytonstone ===
Leytonstone
Party	Candidate	Votes	%	±%
Labour	Jenny Gray	1,886	65.3	
Labour	Clyde Loakes	1,881	65.1	
Labour	Marie Pye	1,778	61.6	
Green	Charlotte Lafferty	557	19.3	
Green	Mark Dawes	523	18.1	
Green	Rosemary Warrington	482	16.7	
Conservative	Matthew Bowden	285	9.9	
Conservative	Shenice Adams	283	9.8	
Conservative	Shahamima Khan	252	8.7	
Liberal Democrats	Sadia Mirza	223	7.7	
Liberal Democrats	Roger Harrison	196	6.8	
Liberal Democrats	David McCarthy	196	6.8	
TUSC	Len Hockey	65	2.3	
TUSC	Maria Talaia	59	2.0	
Turnout			32.7	
Labour hold				
Labour hold				
Labour hold				

=== Markhouse ===
Markhouse (2)
Party	Candidate	Votes	%	±%
Labour	Johar Khan	1,321	74.8	
Labour	Sharon Waldron	1,311	74.3	
Liberal Democrats	Christina Addenbrooke	265	15.0	
Liberal Democrats	Ed Bird	212	12.0	
Conservative	Faizan Hasan	152	8.6	
Conservative	Samina Maqsoom	141	8.0	
TUSC	Linda Taaffe	129	7.3	
Turnout			38.7	
Labour hold				
Labour hold				

=== St. James ===
St. James
Party	Candidate	Votes	%	±%
Labour Co-op	Catherine Deakin	2,068	76.7	
Labour Co-op	Katy Thompson	1,851	68.6	
Labour Co-op	Sabastian Salek	1,595	59.1	
Green	Rachel Barrat	1,132	42.0	
Liberal Democrats	Mike Lewendon	348	12.9	
TUSC	Charlie Edwards	307	11.4	
Liberal Democrats	Nicholas Martlew	276	10.2	
Conservative	Noshaab Khiljee	185	6.9	
Conservative	Zara Maqsoom	184	6.8	
Conservative	Faisal Mehmood	145	5.4	
Turnout			33.2	
Labour Co-op win (new seat)				
Labour Co-op win (new seat)				
Labour Co-op win (new seat)				

=== Upper Walthamstow ===
Upper Walthamstow (2)
Party	Candidate	Votes	%	±%
Labour Co-op	Caramel Quin	1,294	65.0	
Labour Co-op	Yusuf Patel	1,145	57.5	
Green	Roger Payne	426	21.4	
Conservative	Molly Samuel-Leport	415	20.8	
Conservative	Moufazzal Bhuiyan	368	18.5	
Liberal Democrats	Jane Morgan	222	11.1	
TUSC	Lee Hawksbee	70	3.5	
Independent	Sameed Fawad	43	2.2	
Turnout			37.8	
Labour Co-op win (new seat)				
Labour Co-op win (new seat)				

=== Valley ===
Valley (3)
Party	Candidate	Votes	%	±%
Conservative	Afzal Akram	1,812	50.2	
Conservative	Jemma Hemsted	1,788	49.5	
Labour	Elizabeth Baptiste	1,755	48.6	
Conservative	Kimberley Tonner	1,746	48.4	
Labour	Sarah Chaney	1,673	46.4	
Labour	Neil Weeks	1,515	42.0	
Liberal Democrats	Joanna Loxton	203	5.6	
Liberal Democrats	Eric Heinze	172	4.8	
Liberal Democrats	Ipek Ozerim	163	4.5	
Turnout			38.5	
Conservative hold				
Conservative hold				
Labour hold				

=== William Morris ===
William Morris (3)
Party	Candidate	Votes	%	±%
Labour Co-op	Kizzy Gardiner	2,654	83.1	
Labour Co-op	Grace Williams	2,563	80.2	
Labour Co-op	Jack Phipps	2,073	64.9	
Green	Henry Greenwood	1,126	35.2	
Conservative	Hamza Ali	327	10.2	
TUSC	Paula Mitchell	295	9.2	
Conservative	Shaeb Khan	279	8.7	
Conservative	Anmol Seher	266	8.3	
Turnout			35.0	
Labour Co-op hold				
Labour Co-op hold				
Labour Co-op hold				

=== Wood Street ===
Wood Street (2)
Party	Candidate	Votes	%	±%
Labour Co-op	Vicky Ashworth	1,782	86.0	
Labour Co-op	Richard Sweden	1,499	72.3	
Liberal Democrats	Tom Addenbrooke	313	15.1	
Conservative	Rupert Dougall	202	9.7	
TUSC	Mary Finch	181	8.7	
Conservative	Seyyed Naqvi	169	8.2	
Turnout			35.2	
Labour Co-op hold				
Labour Co-op hold				

== Changes 2022-2026 ==
=== By-elections ===
==== Higham Hill ====
Higham Hill by-election: 26 October 2023
Party	Candidate	Votes	%	±%
Labour	Shumon Ali-Rahman	924	57.3	▼3.6
Liberal Democrats	Alex Lewis	268	16.6	▲7.0
Green	Abigail Woodman	198	12.3	▼7.8
TUSC	Nancy Taaffe	144	8.9	▲4.1
Conservative	Moufazzal Bhuiyan	78	4.8	▲0.2
Majority		656	40.7	N/A
Turnout		1,616	17.1	▼10.7
Registered electors		9,481		
Labour hold		Swing	▼5.3	
