= London Borough of Waltham Forest =

Coordinates: 51°34′N 0°02′W

- London borough
- Coat of arms Council logo
- Motto: Fellowship is Life
- Waltham Forest shown within Greater London
- Sovereign state: United Kingdom
- Constituent country: England
- Region: London
- Ceremonial county: Greater London
- Created: 1 April 1965
- Admin HQ: Walthamstow

Government
  - Type: London borough council
  - Body: Waltham Forest London Borough Council
  - London Assembly: Sem Moema (Labour) AM for North East
  - MPs: Calvin Bailey (Labour); Stella Creasy (Labour); Iain Duncan Smith (Con)

Area
  - Total: 14.99 sq mi (38.82 km^{2})
  - Rank: 265th (of 296)

Population (2025)
  - Total: 283,713
  - Rank: 61st (of 296)
  - Density: 18,930/sq mi (7,308/km^{2})
- Time zone: UTC (GMT)
  - Summer (DST): UTC+1 (BST)
- Postcodes: E, IG
- Area code: 020
- ISO 3166 code: GB-WFT
- ONS code: 00BH
- GSS code: E09000031
- Police: Metropolitan Police
- Website: https://www.walthamforest.gov.uk/

The London Borough of Waltham Forest (/ˈwɔːlθəm, ˈwɒl-/) is an outer London borough formed in 1965 from the merger of the Essex municipal boroughs of Leyton, Walthamstow and Chingford.

The borough's administrative headquarters are at Waltham Forest Town Hall, which before the merger of the boroughs, was called Walthamstow Town Hall. The population was 278,428 at the 2021 census. Waltham Forest borders five other London boroughs: Enfield to the north-west, Haringey to the west, Hackney to the south-west, Newham to the south-east and Redbridge to the east, as well as the Epping Forest District of Essex to the north.

The borough takes its name from the former Waltham Forest – a Royal Forest that managed deer in south-west Essex. Epping Forest is a remainder of the former Waltham Forest and forms the eastern and northern fringe of the borough. The River Lea lies to the west where its associated marshes and parkland form a green corridor which, along the reservoir-lined reaches, separates north and east London, and is the historic border between Middlesex and Essex.

Waltham Forest was one of the host boroughs of the London Olympics in 2012, with the Lee Valley Hockey and Tennis Centre and part of the Queen Elizabeth Olympic Park providing an ongoing legacy in the UK and London.

== History ==
=== Name ===
The borough took its name from the former Waltham Forest, a Royal Forest that managed deer in an area of south-west Essex that stretched eastwards from the River Lea and included large areas of agricultural land as well as the wooded areas subsequently known as Epping Forest and Hainault Forest.

The first known use of the name Waltham Forest is 1205 (in Medieval Latin) as foresta nostra prope Waltham, and the use of the name persisted, until the end of the seventeenth century.

=== Early history ===
The area was in the territory of the Trinovantes tribe during the Iron Age and through the Roman period, when the tribal area was a unit of local government. It subsequently became part of the Kingdom of the East Saxons a unit which is likely to have its roots in the territory of the Trinovantes. After the Kingdom of Essex lost its independence, it evolved into the county of Essex.

The Domesday book of 1086 records four manors in the area, Chingford, Walthamstow, Higham and Leyton. At some point, before or after the Domesday survey these also became parishes, with Higham becoming part of the parish of Walthamstow. These parishes had largely stable borders from which those of the later Municipal Boroughs were derived, and these are the basis of our understanding of the extent of these local areas today.

=== Preservation of Epping Forest ===
The southern part of Epping Forest still extends into the north of the borough, 90% of it having been preserved by the Epping Forest Act 1878. This not only assisted in preserving the forest, the attraction value also helped stimulate urbanisation of nearby areas.

=== Urbanisation ===
Until the late Victorian era, the area that became the modern borough was rural in nature with a small dispersed population and a primarily agricultural landscape. Leyton, in particular, grew quite rapidly between 1870 and 1910.

=== Industrial firsts ===
In 1892, a private citizen named Frederick Bremer built the first British motorcar in a workshop in his garden, at Connaught Road, Walthamstow. The vehicle is on display at the Vestry House Museum in Walthamstow. In 1909, the aviation pioneer A V Roe successfully tested the first all-British aeroplane, the Roe I Triplane, on land at Walthamstow Marshes.

=== Air raids in World War One ===
The area now known as Waltham Forest experienced at least two Zeppelin raids during World War I. On 17/18 August 1915, Airship L10 took a route roughly following the Gospel Oak to Barking railway line, dropping incendiary and high-explosive bombs. The first bomb, an incendiary, fell on Hoe St, Walthamstow, at the junction of Orford and Queens Road; the last was dropped in Aldersbrook area. Ten people were killed in Leyton and another 48 injured across the wider area. On 23/24 September 1916 the German Navy airship L 31 dropped around ten bombs along the line of Lea Bridge Road, Leyton, killing eight there. On both occasions the Germans believed they were bombing the City, and it is thought they mistook the Lee Valley Reservoir Chain for the Thames.

=== Blitz - World War Two ===
During the most intense period of the Blitz (October 1940 to June 1941), the area was hit by around 728 high explosive bombs, 17 parachute mines and an unknown, but much greater number of small incendiary bombs. Subsequent raids were lighter and less frequent, but 1944 saw a number of V-1 'flying bombs' and V-2 long-range ballistic missiles hit the area, including a V-1 which landed on central Walthamstow killing 22 and a V-2 which landed on Chingford Road, Walthamstow killing 8.

=== Creation of the modern borough ===
The London Borough of Waltham Forest was created in 1965 under the London Government Act 1963, covering the combined area of the former municipal boroughs of Chingford, Leyton and Walthamstow. The area was transferred from Essex to Greater London to become one of the 32 London Boroughs.

A petition opposed calling the new borough "Walthamstow", so perhaps for that reason the new borough took its name from the former Waltham Forest.

== Governance ==
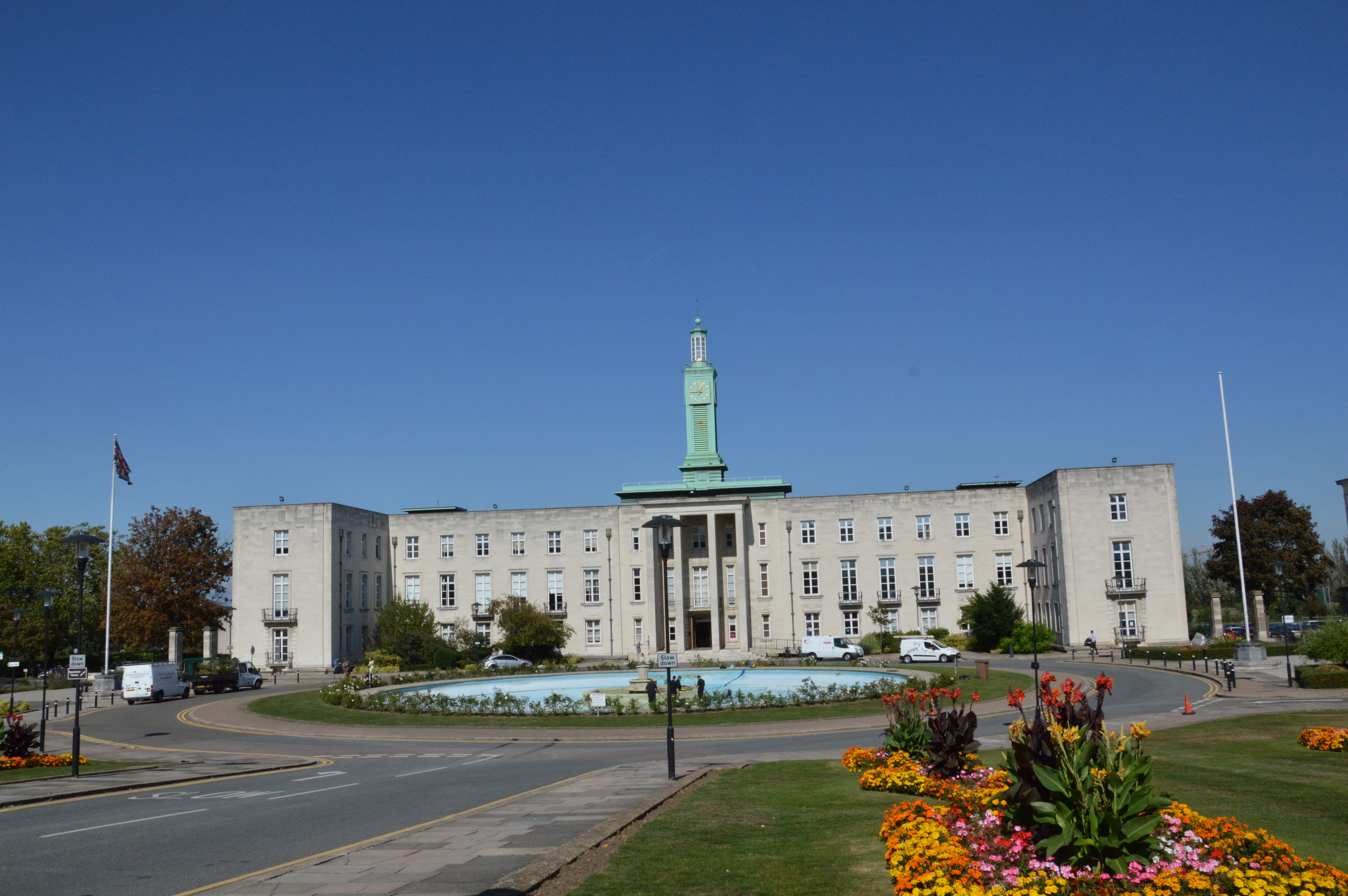
Waltham Forest Town Hall

The local authority is Waltham Forest Council, based at Waltham Forest Town Hall (formerly Walthamstow Town Hall). The administration, since May 2026, has been run by the Waltham Forest Green Party.

=== Greater London representation ===
Since 2000, for elections to the London Assembly, the borough forms part of the North East constituency.

== Demographics ==
Population pyramid of Waltham Forest in 2021

The main centres of population in the borough are Chingford in the north, Walthamstow in the centre (the administrative hub including the council offices) and Leyton and Leytonstone to the South. Waltham Forest has the fifth largest Muslim population in England and the third largest in London (coming after its neighbouring boroughs, Newham and Tower Hamlets).

Population census
Year	Pop.	±%
1801	6,500	—
1811	8,165	+25.6%
1821	9,239	+13.2%
1831	9,505	+2.9%
1841	9,806	+3.2%
1851	10,759	+9.7%
1861	22,635	+110.4%
1871	34,512	+52.5%
1881	46,388	+34.4%
1891	92,948	+100.4%
1901	154,146	+65.8%
1911	255,661	+65.9%
1921	267,592	+4.7%
1931	280,094	+4.7%
1941	274,172	−2.1%
1951	268,383	−2.1%
1961	251,205	−6.4%
1971	235,145	−6.4%
1981	214,595	−8.7%
1991	217,625	+1.4%
2001	218,277	+0.3%
2011	258,249	+18.3%
2021	278,428	+7.8%
2024 estimate	279,737	+0.5%
Note: 2024 estimate

=== Ethnicity ===
Ethnic Group	Year											
Ethnic Group	1971 estimations		1981 estimations		1991 census		2001 census		2011 census		2021 census	
Ethnic Group	Number	%	Number	%	Number	%	Number	%	Number	%	Number	%
White: Total	–	92.2%	175,276	82.5%	157,824	74.4%	140,803	64.5%	134,799	52.1%	147,024	52.8%
White: British	–	–	–	–	–	–	121,694	55.7%	92,999	36.0%	94,766	34.0%
White: Irish	–	–	–	–	–	–	5,112	2.4%	3,959	1.5%	4,230	1.5%
White: Gypsy or Irish Traveller	–	–	–	–	–	–	–	–	369	<1%	198	0.1%
White: Roma	–	–	–	–	–	–	–	–	–	–	1,397	0.5%
White: Other	–	–	–	–	–	–	13,997	6.4%	37,472	14.5%	46,433	16.7%
Asian or Asian British: Total	–	–	–	–	26,940	12.7%	33,659	15.4%	54,389	20.8%	55,545	19.9%
Asian or Asian British: Indian	–	–	–	–	7,042		7,671	3.5%	9,134	3.5%	9,134	3.3%
Asian or Asian British: Pakistani	–	–	–	–	13,298	6.3%	17,295	7.9%	26,347	10.2%	28,740	10.3%
Asian or Asian British: Bangladeshi	–	–	–	–	1,875		2,166	<1%	4,632	1.7%	5,166	1.9%
Asian or Asian British: Chinese	–	–	–	–	1,233		1,443	<1%	2,579	<1%	2,626	0.9%
Asian or Asian British: Other Asian	–	–	–	–	3,492		5,084	2.3%	11,697	4.5%	9,879	3.5%
Black or Black British: Total	–	–	–	–	23,921	11.3%	33,673	15.4%	44,791	17.3%	41,647	14.9%
Black or Black British: African	–	–	–	–	5,967		12,630	5.8%	18,815	7.3%	18,759	6.7%
Black or Black British: Caribbean	–	–	–	–	14,421	6.8%	17,797	8.2%	18,841	7.3%	17,587	6.3%
Black or Black British: Other Black	–	–	–	–	3,533		3,246	1.5%	7,135	2.7%	5,301	1.9%
Mixed or British Mixed: Total	–	–	–	–	–	–	7,749	3.6%	13,776	5.2%	17,983	6.4%
Mixed: White and Black Caribbean	–	–	–	–	–	–	3,007	1.4%	4,568	1.7%	5,135	1.8%
Mixed: White and Black African	–	–	–	–	–	–	1,195	<1%	2,403	<1%	2,777	1.0%
Mixed: White and Asian	–	–	–	–	–	–	1,580	<1%	2,602	1.0%	3,875	1.4%
Mixed: Other Mixed	–	–	–	–	–	–	1,967	<1%	4,193	1.6%	6,196	2.2%
Other: Total	–	–	–	–	3,348	1.6%	2,457	1.1%	10,504	4.0%	16,229	5.8%
Other: Arab	–	–	–	–	–	–	–	–	3,776	1.4%	2,884	1.0%
Other: Any other ethnic group	–	–	–	–	3,348	1.6%	2,457	1.1%	6,728	2.6%	13,345	4.8%
Non-White: Total	–	7.8%	37,122	17.5%	54,209	25.6%	77,538	35.5%	123,450	47.9%	131,404	47.2%
Total	–	100%	212,398	100%	212,033	100%	218,341	100.00%	258,249	100.00%	278,428	100%

=== Religion ===
This table includes data for Waltham Forest borough for 2021 census:

Religion	2021	
Religion	Number	%
Christian	108,630	39,02%
Muslim	60,157	21,61%
Hindu	5,155	1,85%
Buddhist	1,834	0,66%
Sikh	1,285	0,46%
Jewish	1,268	0,46%
Other religion	2,810	1,01%
No religion	77,739	27,92%
Religion not stated	19,548	7,02%
Total	278,426	100%

=== Immigration ===
This list includes top-15 sources of immigration to Borough of Waltham Forest for 2021 census:

#	Country	Number
1	Pakistan	11,035
2	Romania	11,015
3	Poland	5,486
4	Bulgaria	5,438
5	Turkiye	3,516
6	India	3,342
7	Jamaica	3,278
8	Italy	2,944
9	Lithuania	2,529
10	Ghana	2,474
11	Ireland	2,471
12	Bangladesh	2,285
13	Somalia	2,259
14	Moldova	2,075
15	Nigeria	2,021

== Open spaces ==
Epping Forest and the green corridor along the River Lea provide some of the borough's many open spaces, which include:

- Epping Forest (part)
- Queen Elizabeth Olympic Park (part)
- Lee Valley Reservoir Chain (part)
- Walthamstow Marshes
- The Walthamstow Wetlands Reserve, opened in 2017, provides 211 ha (520 acres; 2.11 km^{2}) of open space.
- Leyton Jubilee Park
- Lloyd Park
- Ridgeway Park
- Chingford Mount Cemetery
- Mansfield Park
- Highams Park Field

== Arts, culture and leisure ==
Historically known as the seat of the Arts and Crafts Movement under the stewardship of William Morris, Waltham Forest has continued to succour many contemporary artists & art groups. These include the North East London Independent Artists (NELIA) group, based at the Changing Room Gallery in Lloyd Park, the 491 Gallery in Leytonstone, and a number of independent artists, also mainly in the Leytonstone area. The biennial E17 Art Trail, which includes open studios, exhibitions and events, is the biggest art event in the borough, and there is now a similar event in Leytonstone. Eamon Everall, founder member of the Stuckism art movement is a long-time resident in the borough where he also maintains a studio.

Waltham Forest was the first ever London Borough of Culture in 2019.

Waltham Forest is home to a number of musicians that have found success in the UK, including East 17, Blazin' Squad, and indie band Hefner, who formed in Walthamstow. The borough is also a centre of the grime musical genre; grime acts hailing from the borough include More Fire Crew, Lethal Bizzle, and Jammer, amongst others.

The borough had a key role in the history of rave music culture, whether it be clubs, artists, and DJs. Widely regarded as one of the seminal tracks of jungle music, the creator of "We Are I.E.", Lennie De Ice grew up and lived in Walthamstow. Walthamstow was also home to DJ Rap and MC Navigator. The venue Dungeons was located on Lea Bridge Road in Leyton, and a number of pirate radio stations including Friends FM, Dance FM, and Eruption FM broadcast from tower blocks such as the Cathall Estate in Leytonstone.

The only theatre in the borough, The Waltham Forest Theatre, was situated in Lloyd Park. Though a local campaign was launched to save it in 2008, the theatre was demolished in 2011.

Leyton Orient is the local professional football team, based at Brisbane Road, Leyton. In the 1962–63 season, the club played in the top tier of English football, the Football League First Division, but currently are in League One, the third tier of the English football league system.

== Housing ==
Waltham Forest was one of six local authorities to set up a Housing Action Trust under the Housing Act 1988. The Waltham Forest HAT covered various estates in need of regeneration: Cathall Road in Leytonstone, Oliver Close in Leyton, Boundary Road in Walthamstow and Chingford Hall in Chingford. The HAT transferred its redeveloped estates to Community-based Housing Association and shut down in April 2002. English Partnerships then demolished four empty tower blocks.

The remaining Council housing in the borough is now managed by an arms-length management organisation, Waltham Forest Housing (formerly Ascham Homes).

== Olympics ==
Waltham Forest was one of four host boroughs in east London for the 2012 Olympics. The northern part of the Queen Elizabeth Olympic Park is located in Eton Manor. The borough hosted events in its three Olympic-size swimming pools, one synchronised swimming pool and one water polo pool. These pools were used for athlete training.

During the Paralympic Games, Eton Manor hosted the Wheelchair Tennis events, with temporary seating for 10,500 spectators.

In April 2012, the Ministry of Defence identified the roof of Fred Wigg Tower as a potential location for surface-to-air missile defences during the Games.

== Education ==
Waltham Forest has a number of institutes, including three colleges of further education. Leyton Sixth Form College was the second sixth form college in Southern England to get a licence, and was awarded the title of best college in London for sport in 2013. Others include Waltham Forest College and Sir George Monoux College. Waltham Forest has a sixth form college reorganised system, which it adopted in 1985.

A class in Riverley Primary School in Leyton won the "funniest joke" competition run by The Beano in 2025 and the school's Maisha Mahfuza won the "funniest teacher" accolade.

== Neighbouring authorities ==
Neighbouring authorities are Epping Forest (Essex) in the north, Redbridge in the east, with Newham and Hackney to the south. Haringey and Enfield lie to the west.

== Constituent districts and wards ==
A map showing the wards of Waltham Forest since 2002

=== Districts ===
- Bakers Arms
- Cann Hall
- Chapel End
- Chingford
- Chingford Hatch
- Friday Hill
- Hale End
- Highams Park
- Leyton
- Leytonstone
- Upper Walthamstow
- Walthamstow
- Whipps Cross

=== Wards ===
- Cann Hall
- Cathall
- Chapel End
- Chingford Green
- Endlebury
- Forest
- Grove Green
- Hale End and Highams Park South
- Hatch Lane and Highams Park North
- High Street
- Higham Hill
- Hoe Street
- Larkswood
- Lea Bridge
- Leyton
- Leytonstone
- Markhouse
- St James
- Upper Walthamstow
- Valley
- William Morris
- Wood Street

== Transport ==
=== Railway ===
The area is served by the following London Underground lines:

- Central line serves the south of the borough, running alongside the A12 road, with stations at Leyton and Leytonstone.
- The Victoria line runs roughly through the middle of the borough, with stations at Walthamstow Central and Blackhorse Road.

Both lines are both part of the Night Tube, which provides overnight tube services on Friday and Saturday nights.

London Overground runs through the borough on the following lines:

- The Gospel Oak to Barking line has stations at Walthamstow Queen's Road, Blackhorse Road, Leyton Midland Road and Leytonstone High Road.
- Lea Valley lines run from Liverpool Street station in the City of London; there are stations at St James Street, Walthamstow Central, Wood Street, Highams Park and Chingford.

Greater Anglia serves the south-west of the borough with a station at Lea Bridge; these services connect Stratford and Bishops Stortford.

=== Buses ===
A number of London Buses routes serve the borough, as well as six night bus routes. Services are operated by Arriva London, Stagecoach London and London General.

=== Cycling ===
The pioneering Mini Holland programme has begun to provide protected cycle lanes across the southern half of the borough, increasing the ability to use bicycles as a transport option.

=== Transport usage ===
In March 2011, the main forms of transport that residents used to travel to work were:

- Underground, metro, light rail or tram: 21.0% of all residents aged 16–74
- Car or van: 7.0%
- Bus, minibus or coach: 7.0%
- Train: 6.5%
- On foot: 4.3%
- Work mainly at or from home: 2.1%
- Bicycle: 1.8%.

== Law enforcement ==
Policing is covered by the Metropolitan Police. There is one police station which is based in Chingford and a number of additional patrol centres throughout the borough. Waltham Forest comes under the Met's North-East Basic Command Unit (BCU) following a merger of Waltham Forest's and Newham's policing in 2018

== Notable residents ==
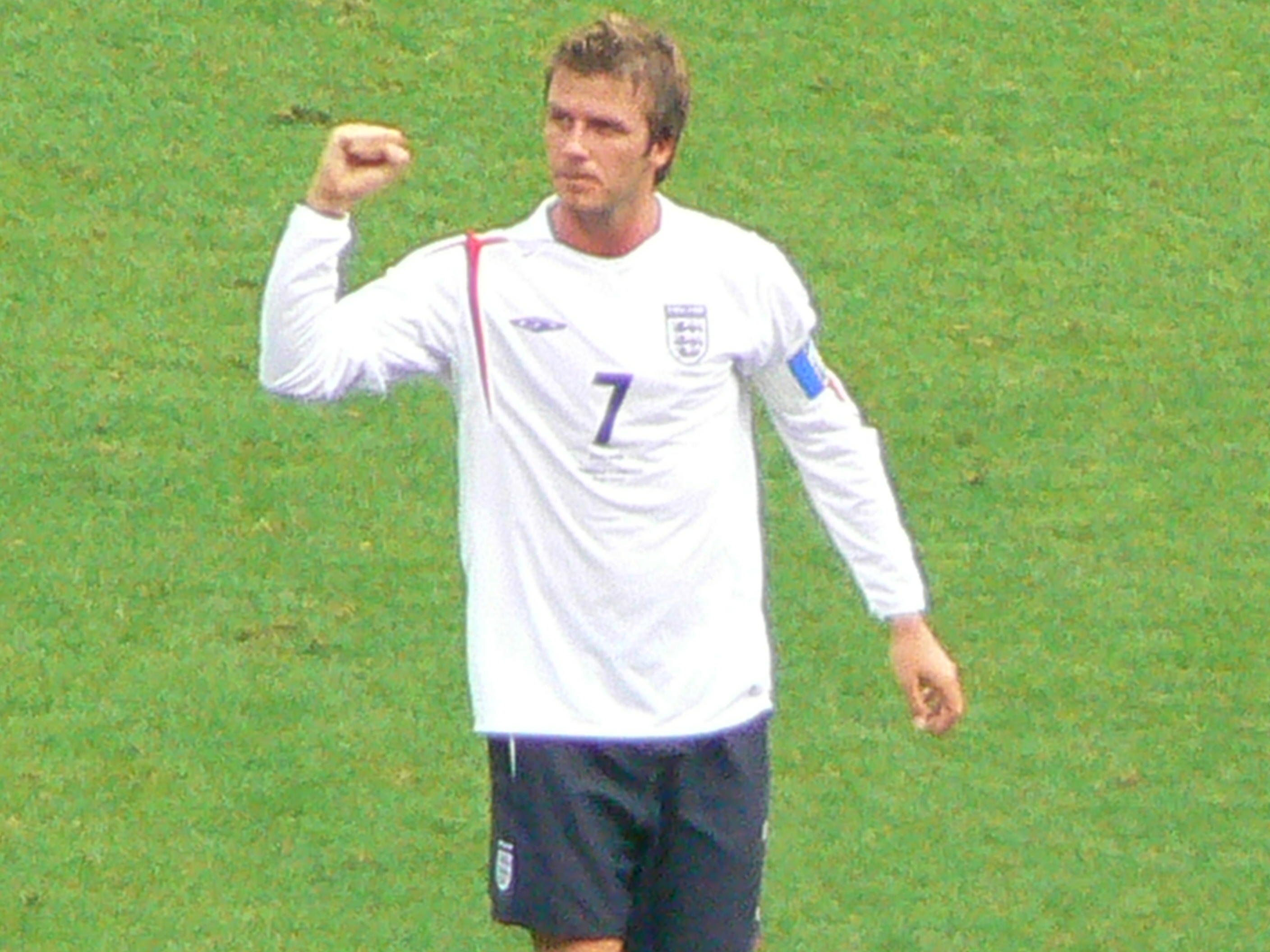
David Beckham

Waltham Forest is the birthplace of William Morris, best known as one of the principal founders of the British Arts and Crafts Movement. Morris was a designer of wallpaper and patterned fabrics, a writer of poetry and fiction, and a pioneer of the socialist movement in Britain.

Other notable people, such as footballer and former England Captain David Beckham, rapper, songwriter and actor Redzz, I, Claudius star Derek Jacobi, former Essex and England cricket Captain Graham Gooch, and the film director and producer Alfred Hitchcock, were also born in the borough. The heavy metal band Iron Maiden was formed in Leyton, and Eastenders actress Rita Simons was born in Leytonstone. Notable Eastenders Actor Adam Woodyatt is from Walthamstow. The poet Pascale Petit, shortlisted three times for the TS Eliot poetry prize, lives in Walthamstow. Notable rap/grime artist Lethal Bizzle is from Walthamstow, and Grayson Perry, the 2003 Turner Prize-winning artist, has his studio in Walthamstow. X Factor finalist Fleur East is also from Walthamstow as well as British Taekwondo Athlete Lutalo Muhammad, and musician Geordie Greep.

== Sports teams ==
- Leyton Orient
- Walthamstow F.C.
- West Essex F.C.
- Leyton Football Club
- Lee Valley Lions

== Twinned cities ==
The London Borough of Waltham Forest is twinned with

- Saint-Mandé, France,
- Wandsbek, Germany,
- Saint John's, Antigua and Barbuda, and
- Roseau, Dominica.

Friendship links have also been established with

- Mirpur, Pakistan.

== Gallery ==
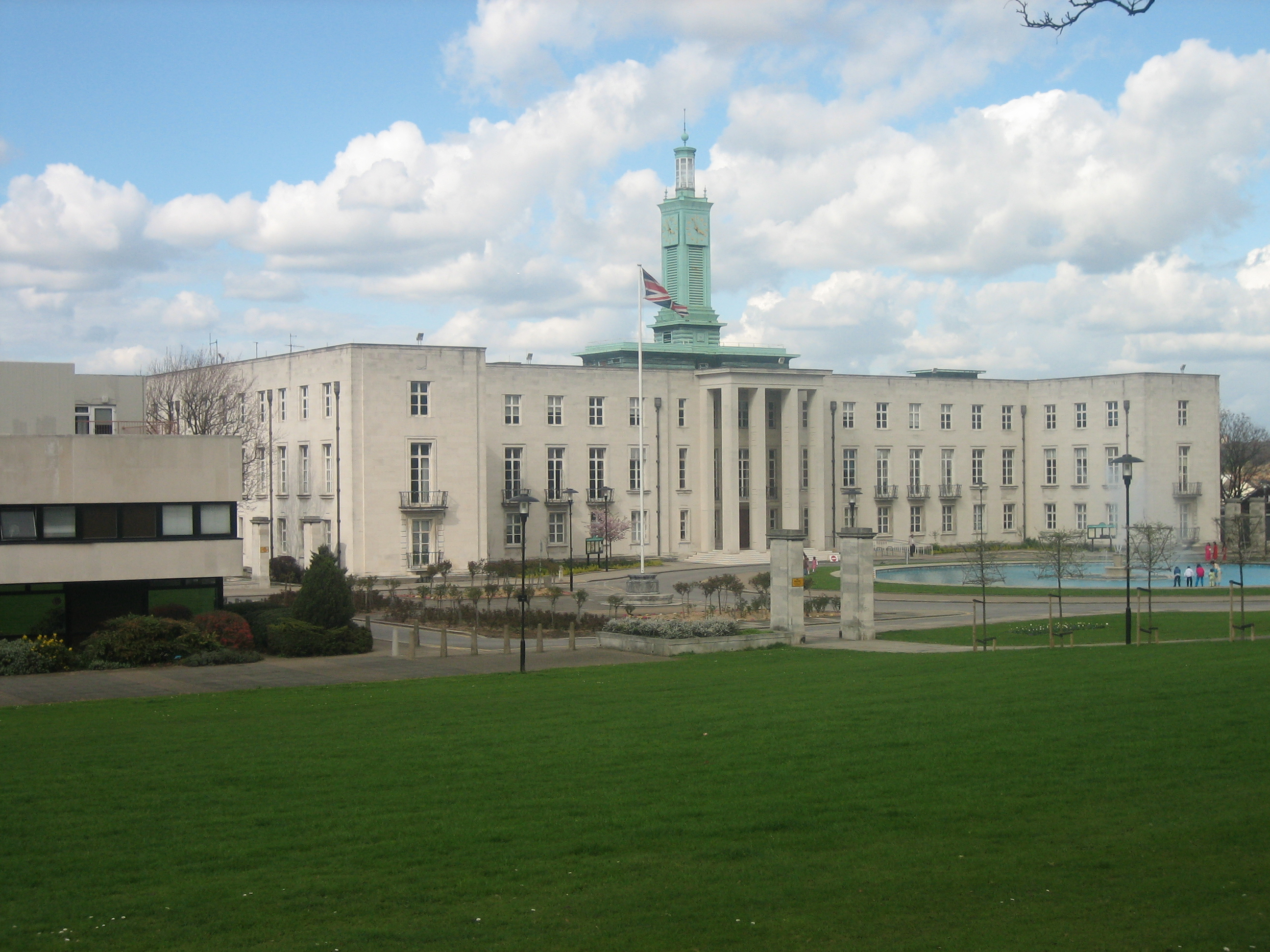
Waltham Forest Town Hall

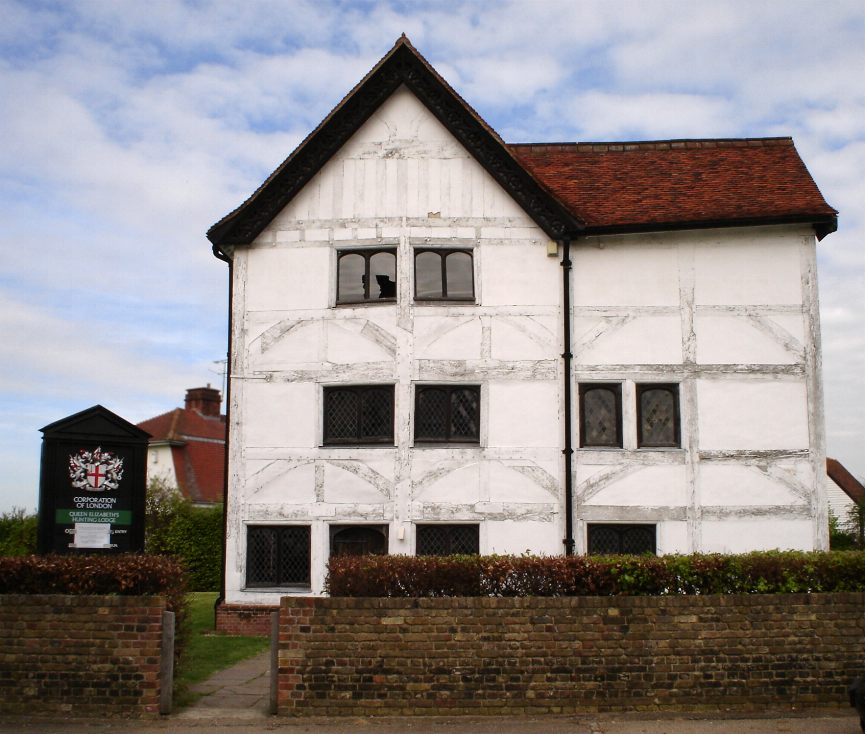
Queen Elizabeth's Hunting Lodge

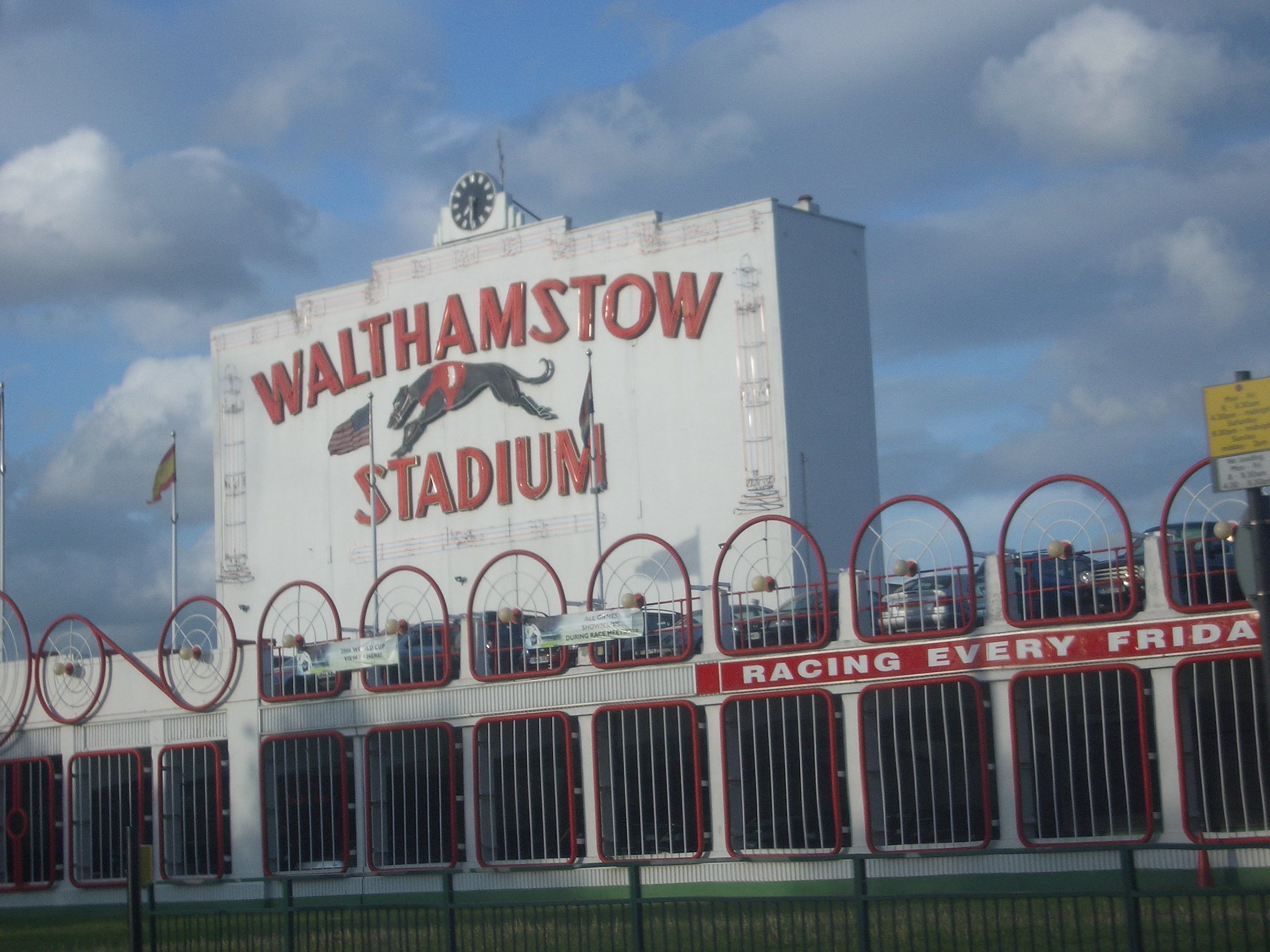
Walthamstow Stadium

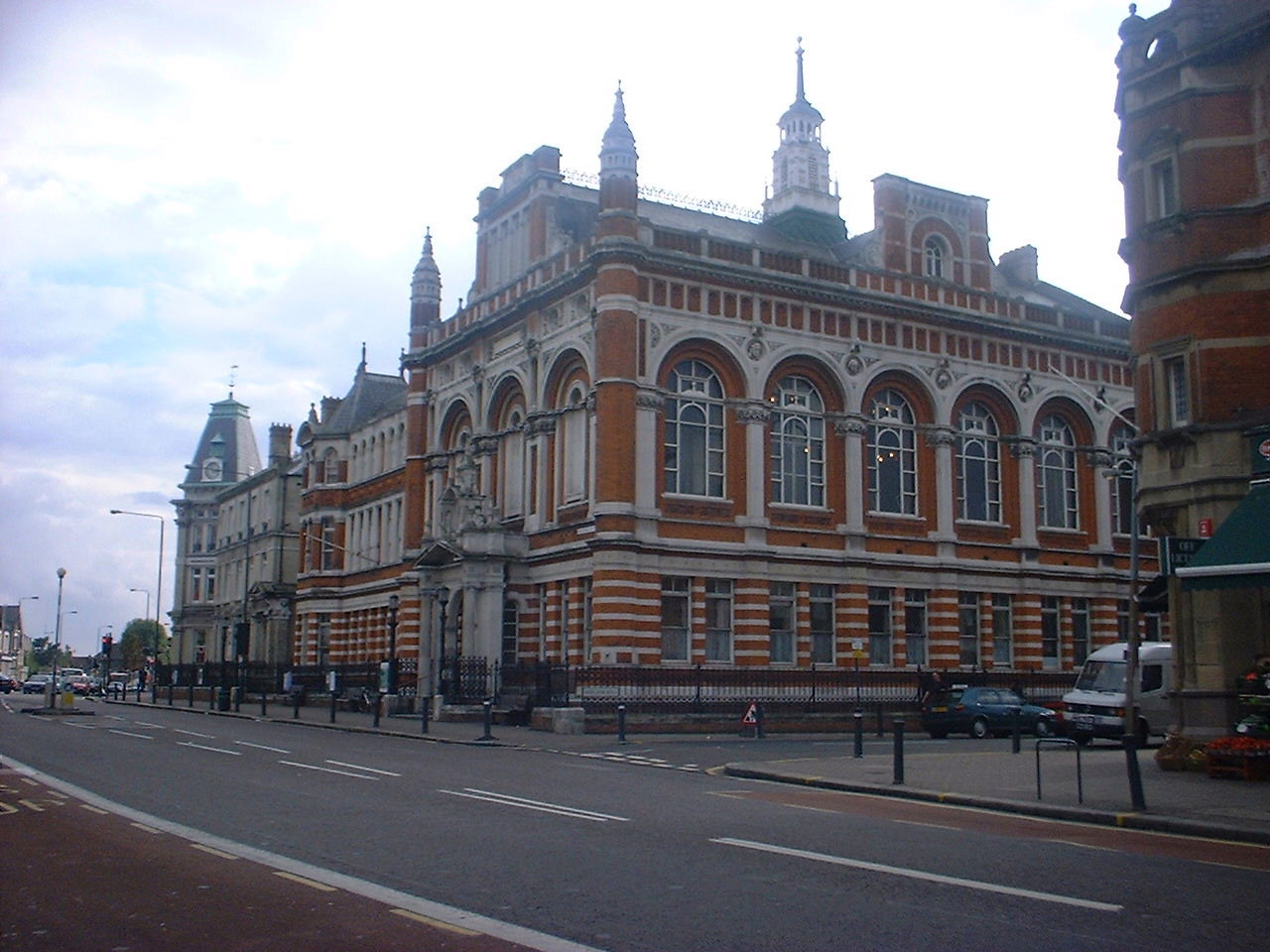
Leyton Town Hall

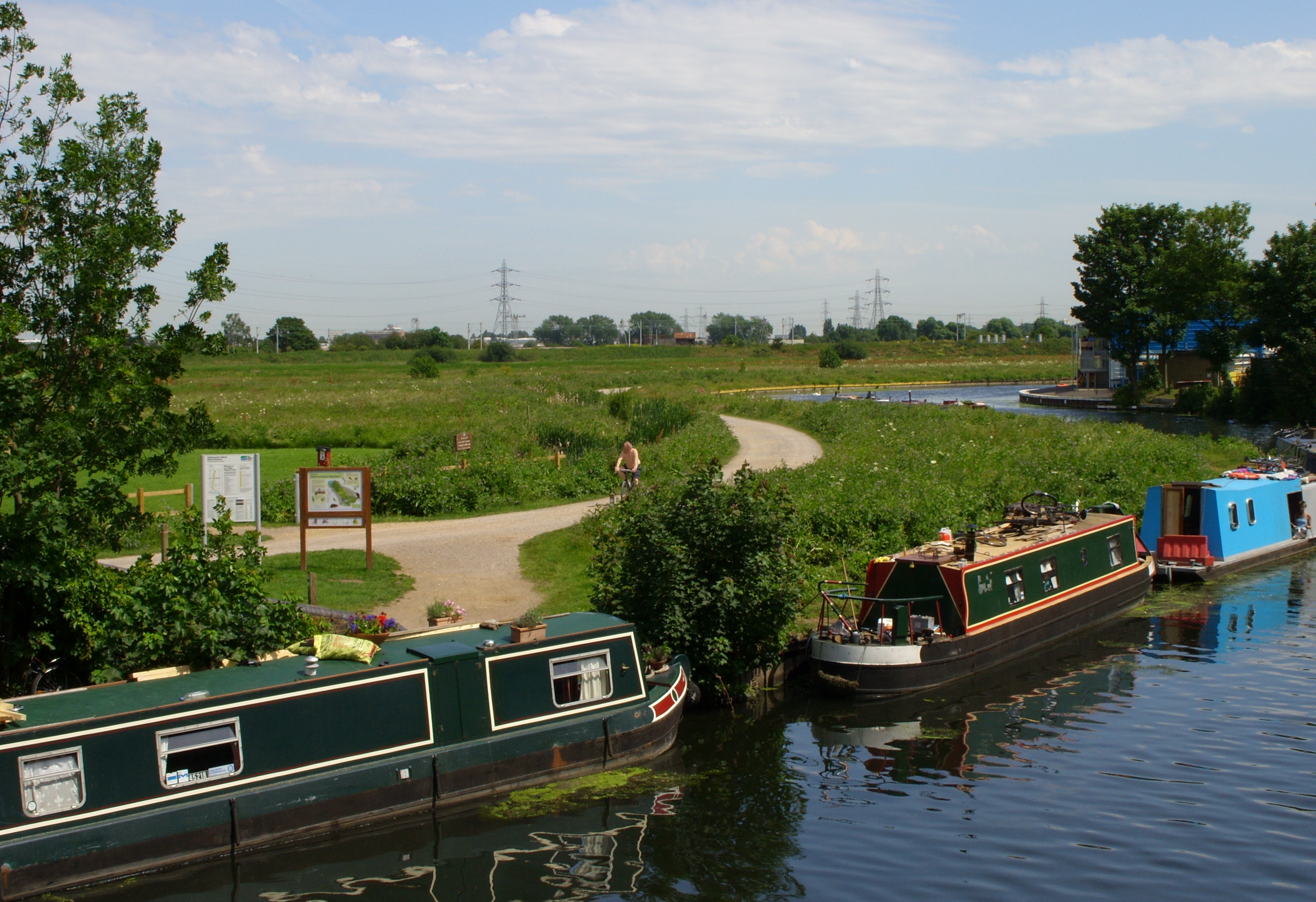
Walthamstow Marshes

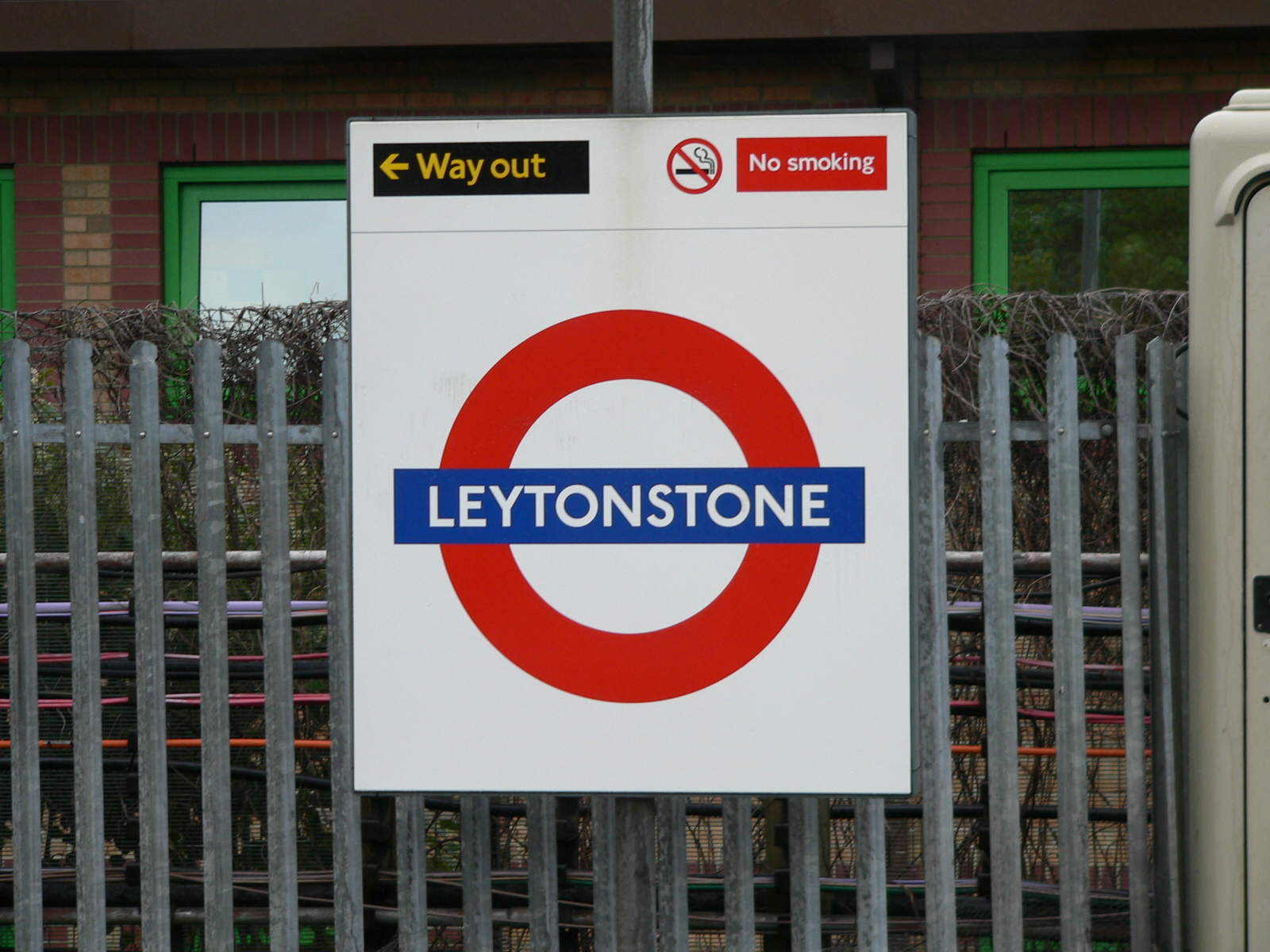
Leytonstone Station

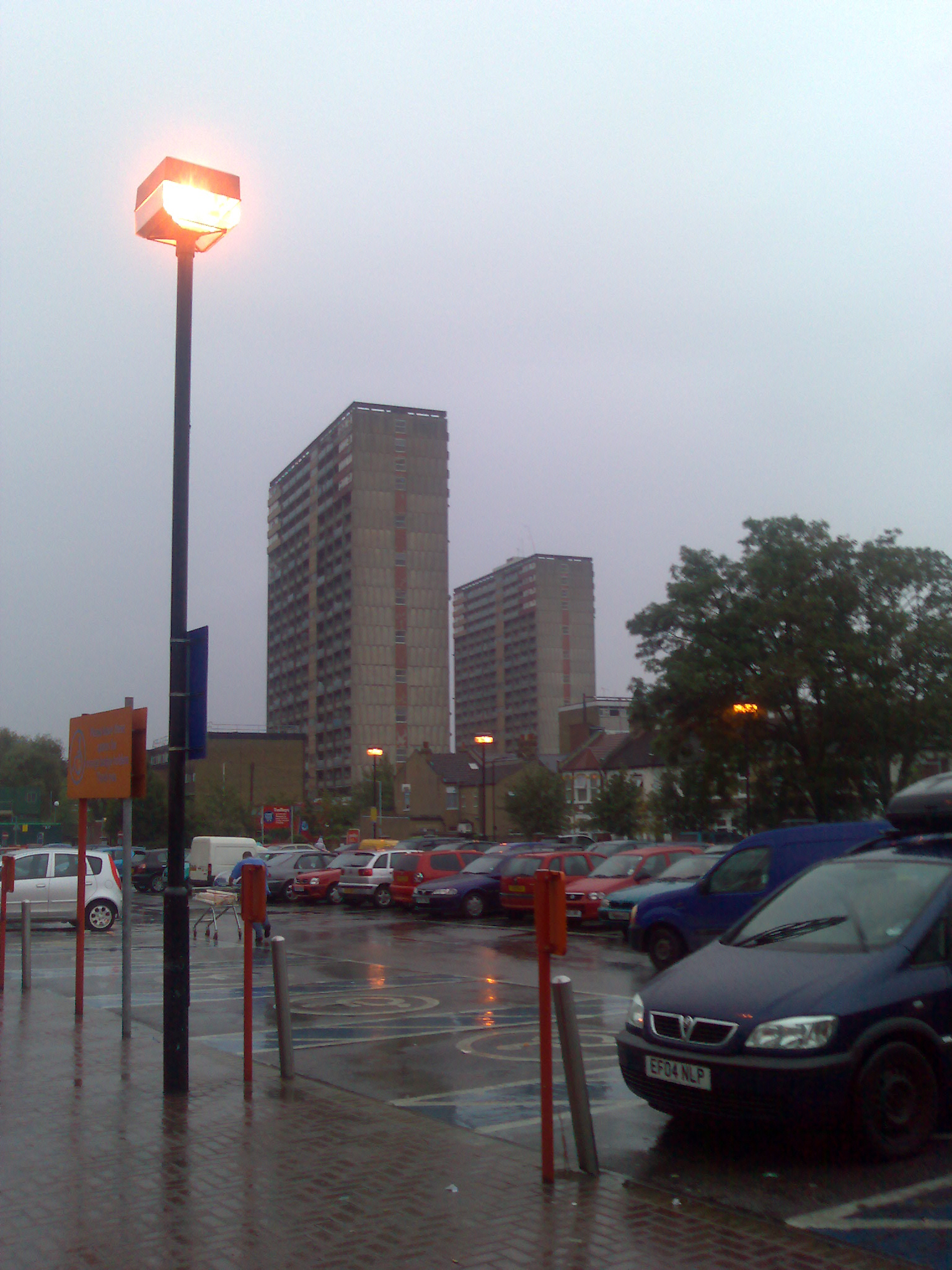
All Saints and St Paul's Tower

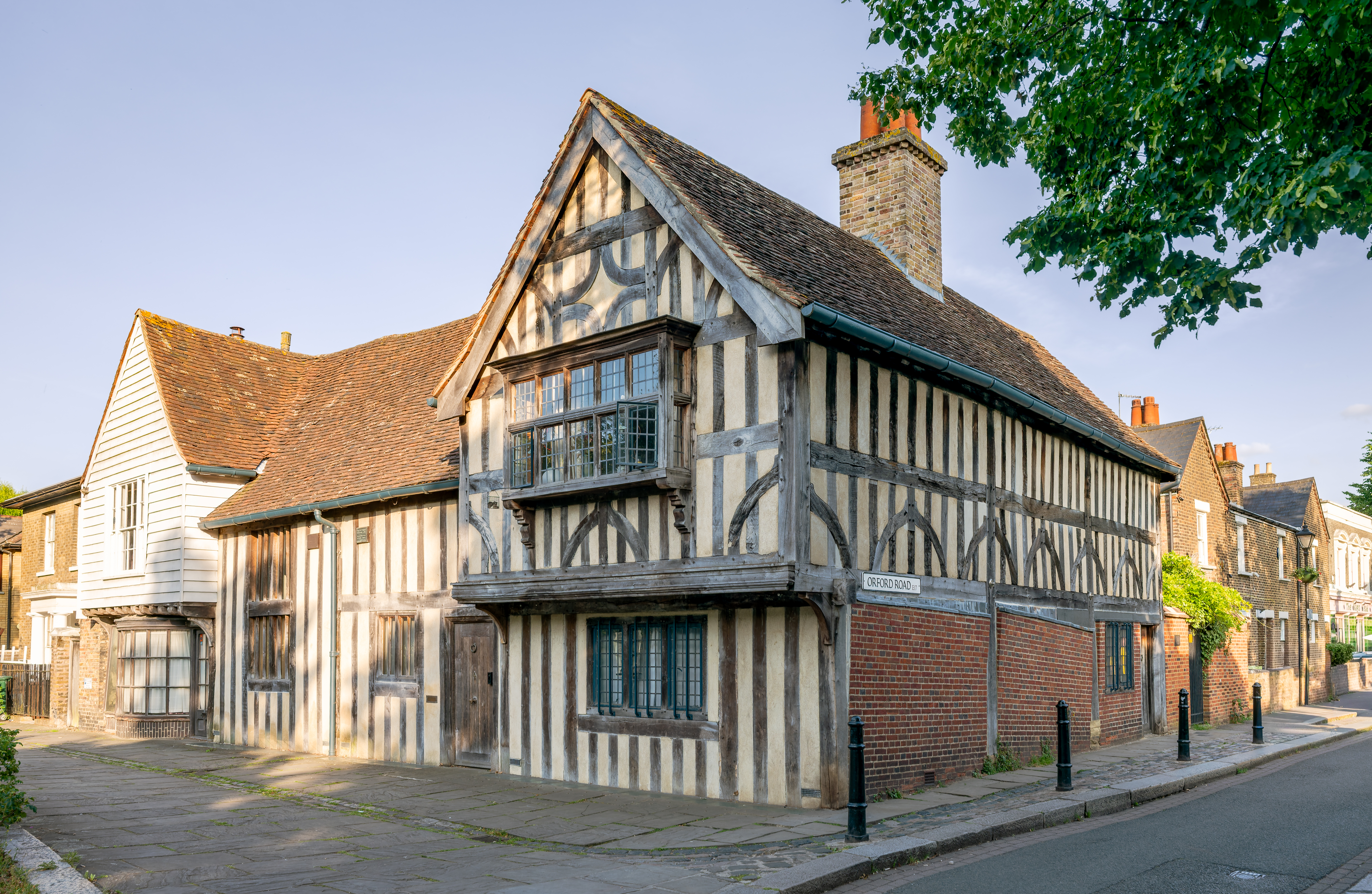
The 'Ancient House' in Walthamstow Village

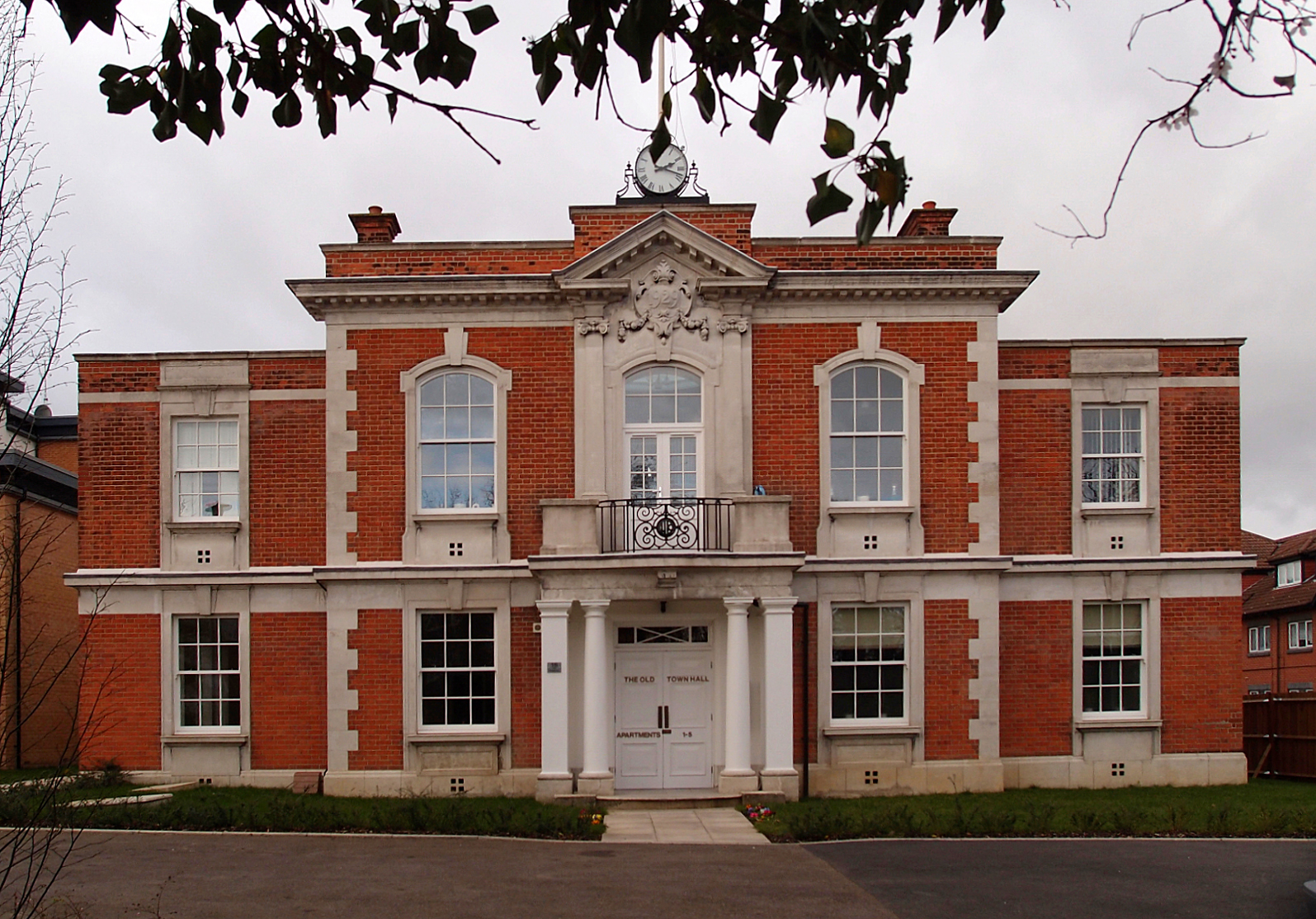
Chingford Town Hall (No longer in use)

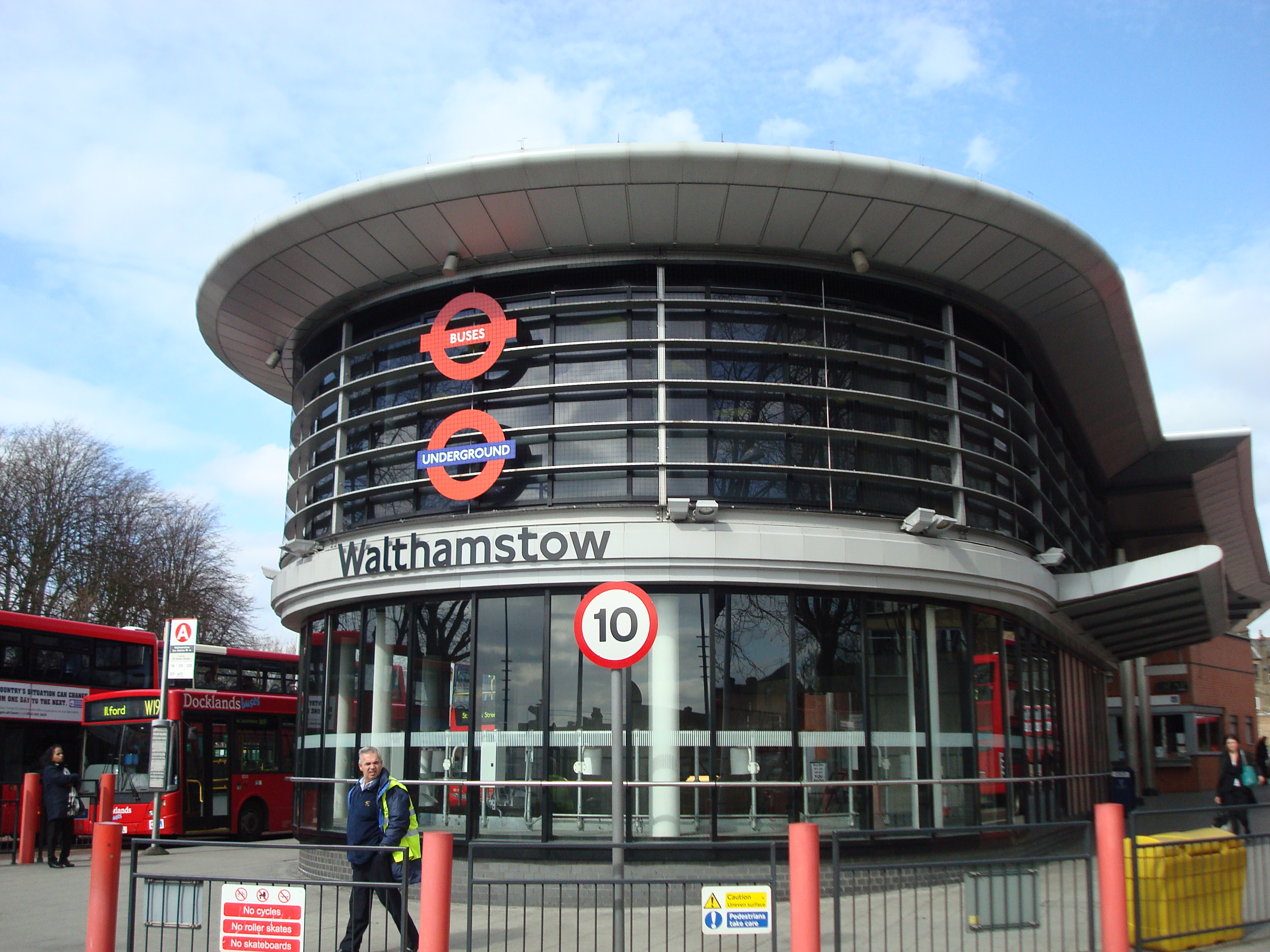
Walthamstow Bus Station just off Selborne Walk

== See also ==
- Waltham Forest parks and open spaces
- Waltham Forest Guardian
- Whipps Cross Hospital
