= Chapel End (ward) =

Electoral ward in London, England

- Electoral ward for the Waltham Forest London Borough Council
- Borough: London Borough of Waltham Forest
- County: Greater London
- Population: 13,614 (2021)
- Major settlements: Chapel End
- Area: 1.466 km²

Current electoral ward
- Created: 1965
- Seats: 3

Chapel End is an electoral ward in the London Borough of Waltham Forest. The ward was first used in the 1964 elections and elects three councillors to Waltham Forest London Borough Council.

== Geography ==
The ward is named after the area of Chapel End.

== Councillors ==
Election	Councillors		
2022	Louise Mitchell (Labour and Co-op)	Paul Douglas (Labour and Co-op)	Steve Terry (Labour and Co-op)
2026	Luke Glazzard (Green)	Layla Rosa (Green)	Sue Wheat (Green)

== Elections ==
=== 2026 election ===
The election took place on 7 May 2026.

2026 Waltham Forest London Borough Council election: Chapel End (3)
Party	Candidate	Votes	%	±%
Conservative	Zainab Akram	255	2.18	
Conservative	Muhammad Amjad Inam	205	1.75	
Conservative	Samina Maqsoom	212	1.81	
Green	Luke Antony Glazzard	1744	14.90	
Green	Layla Louise Rosa	1808	15.45	
Green	Sue Wheat	1784	15.24	
Labour	Paul Douglas	1562	13.35	
Labour	Louise Mitchell	1668	14.25	
Labour	Steve Terry	1407	12.02	
Liberal Democrats	Joe Lloyd Higgs	302	2.58	
Liberal Democrats	Ipek Naciye Ozerim	158	1.35	
Liberal Democrats	Dino Schreuder	155	1.32	
Reform	Marcello Boljevic	349	2.98	
TUSC	Mike Cleverley	94	0.80	
Turnout		11703	41.48	+9.48

=== 2022 ===
Chapel End (3)
Party	Candidate	Votes	%	±%
Labour Co-op	Louise Mitchell	2,101	72.8	
Labour Co-op	Paul Douglas	1,870	64.8	
Labour Co-op	Steve Terry	1,661	57.5	
Green	Susan Wheat	906	31.4	
Liberal Democrats	Beth Bramley	394	13.7	
Conservative	Gillian Hemsted	324	11.2	
Conservative	Roger Hemsted	298	10.3	
Conservative	Irfan Khadim	283	9.8	
Liberal Democrats	Alexander Lewis	249	8.6	
TUSC	Glenroy Watson	200	6.9	
Liberal Democrats	Martin Miller	188	6.5	
TUSC	Kenneth Driscoll	185	6.4	
Turnout			32.0	
Labour Co-op hold				
Labour Co-op hold				
Labour Co-op hold				

=== 1990-2010 ===
Chapel End 2010
Party	Candidate	Votes	%
Labour	Paul Douglas	2,180	
Labour	Kieran Falconer	1,995	
Labour	Abu Samih	1,823	
Liberal Democrats	Matt Lake	1,343	
Liberal Democrats	Saeed Diwan	1,294	
Liberal Democrats	Andrew Morrell	1,229	
Conservative	Millie Balkan	904	
Independent	Bob Belam	844	
Conservative	Owen Evans	820	
Conservative	Anne Hexter	772	
Independent	Bob Carey	667	
Independent	John Macklin	569	
Green	Susan Wheat	536	
UKIP	Bob Brock	296	
Turnout			60.1%
Labour gain from Liberal Democrats			
Labour gain from Liberal Democrats			
Labour gain from Liberal Democrats			

Chapel End 2006
Party	Candidate	Votes	%
Liberal Democrats	Bob Belam	1,653	
Liberal Democrats	Bob Carey	1,537	
Liberal Democrats	John Macklin	1,420	
Labour	David Blunt	663	
Labour	Stephen Terry	632	
Labour	Sabha Akhtar	616	
Conservative	Brian Clarke	459	
Conservative	Josephine Gatward	429	
Green	Richard Burkett	419	
Conservative	John Phelan	373	
Turnout			35.7%
Liberal Democrats hold			
Liberal Democrats hold			
Liberal Democrats hold			

Chapel End 2002
Party	Candidate	Votes	%	±%
Liberal Democrats	Robert Belam*	1,468	55.33	▲7.65
Liberal Democrats	Robert Carey^{†} (Note: Carey was a sitting councillor representing the Higham Hill ward)	1,405		
Liberal Democrats	John Macklin	1,341		
Labour	Jack Kaye	744	26.38	▼3.76
Labour	Paul Redcliffe	642		
Labour	Faiz Yunis	623		
Conservative	Nial Finlayson	491	18.29	▲0.08
Conservative	Andrea Stevenson	454		
Conservative	Karl Lee	448		
Registered electors		8,120		▲295
Turnout		2,699	33.24	▼5.14
Rejected ballots		16	0.59	▲0.09
Liberal Democrats win (new boundaries)				
Liberal Democrats win (new boundaries)				
Liberal Democrats win (new boundaries)				

Chapel End 1998
Party	Candidate	Votes	%	±%
Liberal Democrats	Patricia Atherton*	1,402	47.68	▼4.73
Liberal Democrats	Robert Belam*	1,395		
Liberal Democrats	Graham Woolnough*	1,354		
Labour	Jack Kaye	949	30.14	▲4.01
Labour	Richard Sweden	855		
Labour	Mahesh Laheru	820		
Conservative	Christopher McMurray	504	18.21	▲1.86
Conservative	Eric Edis	502		
Conservative	Richard McCauley	502		
BNP	Alan Gould	141	5.11	New
Registered electors		7,825		▼92
Turnout		3,003	38.38	▼11.80
Rejected ballots		15	0.50	▲0.42
Liberal Democrats hold				
Liberal Democrats hold				
Liberal Democrats hold				

Chapel End 1994
Party	Candidate	Votes	%	±%
Liberal Democrats	Robert Belam*	2,103	52.41	▲14.66
Liberal Democrats	Patricia Atherton	2,052		
Liberal Democrats	Graham Woolnough*	1,970		
Labour	Jack Kaye	1,095	26.13	▲3.28
Labour	Sylbert Rudder	992		
Labour	Rukhsana Khan	967		
Conservative	David Angus	688	16.35	▼15.72
Conservative	Michael Caplan	618		
Conservative	Philippa Stone	604		
Green	Richard Burkett	199	5.11	▼2.22
Registered electors		7,917		▼307
Turnout		3,973	50.18	▼5.64
Rejected ballots		3	0.08	▲0.04
Liberal Democrats hold				
Liberal Democrats hold				
Liberal Democrats hold				

Chapel End 1990
Party	Candidate	Votes	%
Liberal Democrats	Lucille D. Wells*	1,756	37.75
Liberal Democrats	Robert D. Belam	1,716	
Liberal Democrats	Graham A. Woolnough*	1,690	
Conservative	Joyce Q.L. Unwin	1,477	32.07
Conservative	Anita L. Owen	1,475	
Conservative	Steven Strum	1,434	
Labour	Michael McD. Cummins	1,127	22.85
Labour	Iain R. McWhinnie	1,002	
Labour	Neville Stephenson	996	
Green	David Downing	334	7.33
Registered electors		8,224	
Turnout		4,591	55.82
Rejected ballots		2	0.04
Liberal Democrats hold			
Liberal Democrats hold			
Liberal Democrats hold			

== See also ==
- List of electoral wards in Greater London
