= Eric Heinze =

Legal philosopher

Eric Heinze is Professor of Law and Humanities at the School of Law Queen Mary, University of London. He has made contributions in the areas of legal philosophy, justice theory, jurisprudence, and human rights. He has also contributed to the law and literature movement.

== Social and legal theory ==
In Coming Clean: The Rise of Critical Theory and the Future of the Left, Eric Heinze argues that political progressives have insisted on critical understandings of western history but have failed to apply the same critical methods to the histories of the left itself. In an interview on National Public Radio, Heinze argued that his aim was not to ‘define’ the left but to identify ‘dominant strands’ that have driven leftist politics and activism. In The New York Post he wrote that the left needs to change what is often referred to as its ‘memory politics’. An Irish Times columnist asked whether Heinze could be accused of Whataboutery, by emphasizing left-wing atrocities to divert attention from those on the right. According to a review in the Danish newspaper Berlingske, Heinze is not arguing that "progressives should stop doing critical theory, or abolish diversity policies, queer theory or feminism’, but that they need ‘a new way to do it’".

In The Concept of Injustice, Heinze examines what he calls the 'classical' style of justice theory, running from Plato to Rawls. Classical justice theorists, Heinze argues, depart from notions of 'injustice' on the seemingly obvious assumption that 'justice' and 'injustice' are logical opposites. For Heinze, 'injustice', in ancient and modern Western languages, is a sheer etymological happenstance. 'Justice' and 'injustice' do appear as opposites within conventional, already pre-defined contexts, in which certain norms are uncritically assumed. Outside of such assumptions, however, the relationship between the two terms becomes far more complex.

In order to overcome that recurring error, Heinze proposes a notion of 'post-classical' justice theory, using literary texts as examples. That project continues Heinze's earlier publications in Law & Literature. In an article in the journal Law & Critique, the feminist scholar Adrian Howe examines how Heinze has innovated within critical theory to offer alternative readings of William Shakespeare. Citing the example of The Comedy of Errors, Howe explains how, well into the 20th century, scholars often thought that Shakespeare would not have sought to convey a serious socio-legal critique in a seemingly frivolous play. Heinze, according to Howe, uncovers a "range of socio-legal dualisms; master–servant, husband–wife, native–alien, parent–child, monarch–parliament, buyer–seller. The Comedy, [Heinze] argues, deploys concepts of 'comedy' and 'error' to reflect problematic socio-legal relationships that are based on traditional but changing models of socio-legal domination and subordination." Howe adds that, on Heinze's reading, "it is the viewpoint of the privileged male that is challenged in the play." In The Concept of Injustice, Heinze amplifies those themes. He reviews classical theories of justice, from Plato to Rawls, challenging their assumptions of a seemingly logical opposition between the concepts of 'justice' and 'injustice'.

== Free speech ==
In the area of human rights, Heinze has frequently challenged Western European restrictions on freedom of speech, as embodied in so-called "hate speech" bans. Heinze argues that a modern democracy has more effective and more legitimate ways of combating social intolerance, without having to restrict speech within the public sphere. According to the free speech expert Eric Barendt, Heinze identifies further problems of coherence within hate speech bans. Barendt writes that the bans, according to Heinze's critique, "are often justified as necessary to prevent discrimination against the targeted racial or other groups. But in fact they themselves discriminate between the groups protected by hate speech laws (racial, ethnic, religious groups and gays) and those left unprotected (other cultural groups, the physically and mentally disabled, transsexuals)."

In his book Hate Speech and Democratic Citizenship Heinze reviews ongoing debates about the legality of dangerous, provocative or offensive speech. He concedes that some democracies may be unstable enough to require bans, but one that has crossed a discernible threshold to become what Heinze calls a ‘longstanding, stable and prosperous democracy’ (LSPD) can only legitimately curtail expression within public discourse on ‘viewpoint-selective’ grounds under independently reviewable criteria of a ‘state of exception’ constituting a national security emergency.

Heinze acknowledges that hate speech has led to violence in Rwanda, the German Weimar Republic, the immediate post-Cold War Yugoslavia, and other weaker democracies. None of these, Heinze notes, were LSPDs. Full-fledged democracies, by contrast, have more legitimate and effective ways of combatting violence and discrimination without having to punish persons who hold provocative views.‘Central to the LSPD model’, according to Lesley Abdela, ‘it can be shown that western democratic states have taken moral and symbolic stands—not always perfectly or without contradiction— but certainly in more than peripheral, lip-service ways. Measures including non-discrimination laws, pluralist primary education (and bans on individually targeted stalking, harassment, or ‘fighting words’) convey the state's moral and symbolic messages against intolerance or violence.’

In The Most Human Right: Why Free Speech Is Everything, Heinze argues that internationally recognized human rights have collapsed in part because of institutional failures to distinguish between human rights and human goods. Heinze argues that many traditions throughout history have recognised essential human goods, so if human rights are to play any distinct role, they must do something more than just restate human goods. Scrutinising the concept of a right, Heinze argues that it is only through free speech that human goods can become the objects of human rights, which entails the further conclusion that outside democracy the concept of human rights makes no sense – and simply collapses, at best, into a concept of human goods.

Writing in his regular Irish Times ‘Unthinkable’ Series, columnist Joe Humphreys summarises Heinze's argument as follows: ‘If a sufficiently democratic environment does not exist, then the thing you are seeking as a “right” is merely a “good”, something desirable which a government may or may not provide.’ Reviewing the book for the Swedish Dixicon site the international human rights expert Hans Ingvar Roth adds: “it is no coincidence either that many authoritarian leaders throughout history have always first focused on that very right before they started to threaten the others too.”

== Sexuality ==
Heinze has also written on problems of sexuality and human rights. James M. Donovan summarises some of Heinze's criticisms of international organisations. Donovan notes that, in Heinze's view, "the failure to include sexual orientation within the United Nations human rights agenda, by the late 20th century, had resulted not merely in the exclusion of sexual orientation, but in a further mystification of it, which in turn was used to justify its continued exclusion. For Jennifer Wilson, Heinze's view in particular explains "the exclusion of transgender people from anti-discrimination laws." The Norwegian historian of religion Dag Øistein Endsjø contends that, according to Heinze, the absence of any specific reference to sexual orientation or identity in earlier international human rights instruments "does not mean that [sexual minorities'] fundamental rights are excluded from protection by these conventions." Simon Obendorf argues that "homosexual rights are indeed worthy of protection at international law", but questions "Eric Heinze's calls for a treaty-based instrument to codify and enforce principles of non-discrimination on the basis of sexual orientation in international law." Obendorf challenges the concept of "sexual minorities" which Heinze, in his book Sexual Orientation: A Human Right, defines as "people whose sexual orientation derogates from a dominant heterosexual norm." Susan Sterett draws greater attention to Heinze's view of fluid and contingent sexual identities and orientations. Heinze, according to Sterett, "maps the discourse of sexual orientation onto postmodernist forms of knowledge, which emphasize the fragmentation of the legal subject." Conway Blake and Philip Dayle further explore Heinze's view "that sexual minorities have become pawns in what [Heinze] calls the international 'sensitivity game'. Blake and Dayle continue:

In this game, post-colonial regimes bolster their domestic authority by promoting nationalist campaigns based on ideas about sexuality, which depict minority sexual orientations as manifestations of Western decadence. Resistance to any programme of tolerance towards homosexuality is said to be rooted in 'ancient' and 'indigenous' traditions. Heinze also notes the tendency of western states to eagerly demonstrate that they are not imposing a 'first world' agenda on 'traditional' societies. As a consequence, there has been a self-censoring forbearance in challenging southern states, as a kind of deference to indigenous cultural beliefs. In short, Heinze complains that many western states have been willing to tolerate human rights relativity in the context of sexuality.

== Politics of international human rights ==
Heinze's criticisms of international law and institutions have also reached beyond the specific issues of free speech and sexuality. In other writing, he examines how inter-governmental and non-governmental organisations become politicised, therefore failing to adhere to their own professed mandates. According to Rosa Freedman, Heinze explains how state members of the United Nations Human Rights Council, as well as its predecessor, the UN Human Rights Commission, have used bloc voting to ensure an entrenched and systemic "sidelining" of attention away from the gravest human rights situations.

Contrary to writers who advocate political compromise and piecemeal approaches, Heinze argues that the criterion of universally even-handed application of norms and standards necessarily inheres within any concept of human rights. He further warns that, insofar as human rights are designed to apply universally to all states, irrespective of political system, they by definition never fully satisfy the requirements of a democratic state.

In The Most Human Right Heinze argues that the concept of human rights has become so diluted within international law and organizations as to carry little if any meaning. Heinze argues that governments and international organizations have failed to distinguish adequately between the concept of human rights and the concept of human goods. Many things are good, such as not being tortured, or having access to enough food, but these goods only manifest as objects of human rights when citizens are sufficiently able to agitate openly and candidly for them, including extensive opportunities to criticize their governments. Otherwise we are left, at best, with nothing but state-monopolized, managerial regimes of human goods, which, Heinze argues, are the arch-opposite of citizen-directed regimes of human rights.

== Career ==
After receiving his Licence and Maîtrise from the Université de Paris, Heinze enrolled as a DAAD scholar at the Freie Universität Berlin. He received a Juris Doctor from Harvard Law School, and, following a Fulbright fellowship at the University of Utrecht, completed a Doctorate in Law at the University of Leiden.

Heinze's other awards include grants from the Nuffield Foundation; a Chateaubriand fellowship (French Ministry of Education); a Sheldon fellowship (Harvard Law School); an Andres Public Interest grant (Harvard Law School); and a C. Clyde Ferguson Human Rights Fellowship (Harvard Law School).

Before his appointment at the University of London, Heinze completed work for the International Commission of Jurists in Geneva and the United Nations Administrative Tribunal in New York. Heinze has advised the human rights organisations Amnesty International, Liberty, and the Media Diversity Institute. He also serves on the editorial board of The International Journal of Human Rights, and serves on the Advisory Boards for Rivista Italiana di Filosofia Politica (journal of the Italian Society of Political Philosophy) (2021 – present), Heliopolis: Culture Civiltà Politica (2020 – present), and University of Bologna Law Review (2018–present).

Heinze was a Liberal Democrat candidate for the Valley ward in the 2022 Waltham Forest London Borough Council election, coming 8th in the three-member ward.

== Publications ==
Heinze is the author of several books on legal theory and philosophy, including:

- Sexual Orientation: A Human Right (Kluwer 1995) (Russian translation, Idea Press Moscow 2004)
- Of Innocence and Autonomy: Children, Sex and Human Rights (editor, Ashgate 2000 / Routledge 2017)
- The Logic of Liberal Rights (Routledge 2003 / Routledge 2017)
- The Logic of Equality (Ashgate 2003 / Routledge 2017)
- The Logic of Constitutional Rights (Ashgate 2005 / Routledge 2017)
- The Concept of Injustice (Routledge 2013)
- Hate Speech and Democratic Citizenship (Oxford University Press 2016)
- The Most Human Right: Why Free Speech is Everything (The MIT Press, 2022)
- Coming Clean: The Rise of Critical Theory and the Future of the Left (The MIT Press, 2025)
