= Markhouse =

Electoral ward in London, England

- Electoral ward for the Waltham Forest London Borough Council
- Borough: London Borough of Waltham Forest
- County: Greater London
- Population: 9,274 (2021)
- Area: 0.7028 km²

Current electoral ward
- Created: 2002
- Seats: 2 (since 2022); 3 (until 2022)

Markhouse is an electoral ward in the London Borough of Waltham Forest. The ward was first used in the 2002 elections and elects two councillors to Waltham Forest London Borough Council.

== Geography ==
The ward is named after the Markhouse Road area of Walthamstow.

== Councillors ==
| Election | Councillors | |
|---|---|---|
| 2022 | Johar Khan (Labour) | Sharon Waldron (Labour) |

== Elections ==
=== 2022 ===
Markhouse (2)
| Party | Candidate | Votes | % | ±% |
|---|---|---|---|---|
| Labour | Johar Khan | 1,321 | 74.8 | |
| Labour | Sharon Waldron | 1,311 | 74.3 | |
| Liberal Democrats | Christina Addenbrooke | 265 | 15.0 | |
| Liberal Democrats | Ed Bird | 212 | 12.0 | |
| Conservative | Faizan Hasan | 152 | 8.6 | |
| Conservative | Samina Maqsoom | 141 | 8.0 | |
| TUSC | Linda Taaffe | 129 | 7.3 | |
| Turnout | | | 38.7 | |
| Labour hold | | | | |
| Labour hold | | | | |

== See also ==
- List of electoral wards in Greater London
