= Upper Walthamstow (ward) =

Electoral ward in London, England

- Electoral ward for the Waltham Forest London Borough Council
- Borough: London Borough of Waltham Forest
- County: Greater London
- Population: 8,195 (2021)
- Major settlements: Upper Walthamstow
- Area: 1.829 km²

Current electoral ward
- Created: 2022
- Seats: 2

Upper Walthamstow is an electoral ward in the London Borough of Waltham Forest. The ward was first used in the 2022 elections and elects two councillors to Waltham Forest London Borough Council.

== Geography ==
The ward is named after the area of Upper Walthamstow.

== Councillors ==
Election	Councillors	
2022	Caramel Quin (Labour and Co-op)	Yusuf Patel (Labour and Co-op)

== Elections ==
=== 2022 ===
Upper Walthamstow (2)
Party	Candidate	Votes	%	±%
Labour Co-op	Caramel Quin	1,294	65.0	
Labour Co-op	Yusuf Patel	1,145	57.5	
Green	Roger Payne	426	21.4	
Conservative	Molly Samuel-Leport	415	20.8	
Conservative	Moufazzal Bhuiyan	368	18.5	
Liberal Democrats	Jane Morgan	222	11.1	
TUSC	Lee Hawksbee	70	3.5	
Independent	Sameed Fawad	43	2.2	
Turnout			37.8	
Labour Co-op win (new seat)				
Labour Co-op win (new seat)				

== See also ==
- List of electoral wards in Greater London
