= St James (Waltham Forest ward) =

Electoral ward in London, England

- Electoral ward for the Waltham Forest London Borough Council
- Borough: London Borough of Waltham Forest
- County: Greater London
- Population: 11,743 (2021)
- Area: 3.063 km²

Current electoral ward
- Created: 2022
- Seats: 3

St James is an electoral ward in the London Borough of Waltham Forest. The ward was first used in the 2022 elections and elects three councillors to Waltham Forest London Borough Council.

== Geography ==
The ward is named after the St James area.

== Councillors ==
Election	Councillors		
2022	Catherine Deakin (Labour and Co-op)	Katy Thompson (Labour and Co-op)	Sebastian Salek (Labour and Co-op)

== Elections ==
=== 2022 ===
St. James
Party	Candidate	Votes	%	±%
Labour Co-op	Catherine Deakin	2,068	76.7	
Labour Co-op	Katy Thompson	1,851	68.6	
Labour Co-op	Sabastian Salek	1,595	59.1	
Green	Rachel Barrat	1,132	42.0	
Liberal Democrats	Mike Lewendon	348	12.9	
TUSC	Charlie Edwards	307	11.4	
Liberal Democrats	Nicholas Martlew	276	10.2	
Conservative	Noshaab Khiljee	185	6.9	
Conservative	Zara Maqsoom	184	6.8	
Conservative	Faisal Mehmood	145	5.4	
Turnout			33.2	
Labour Co-op win (new seat)				
Labour Co-op win (new seat)				
Labour Co-op win (new seat)				

== See also ==
- List of electoral wards in Greater London
