= Endlebury =

Electoral ward in London, England

- Electoral ward for the Waltham Forest London Borough Council
- Borough: London Borough of Waltham Forest
- County: Greater London
- Population: 9,322 (2021)
- Area: 1.667 km^{2}

Current electoral ward
- Created: 1978
- Seats: 2

Endlebury is an electoral ward in the London Borough of Waltham Forest. The ward, located in Chingford, was first used in the 1978 elections and elects two councillors to Waltham Forest London Borough Council.

== Councillors ==
Election	Councillors	
2022	Roy Berg (Conservative)	Emma Best (Conservative)

== Elections ==
=== 2022 ===
Endlebury (2)
Party	Candidate	Votes	%	±%
Conservative	Roy Berg	1,568	61.3	
Conservative	Emma Best	1,529	59.8	
Labour	Sharon King	940	36.8	
Labour	Luke Willmoth	794	31.1	
Liberal Democrats	Nigel Lea	161	6.3	
TUSC	Sarah Sachs-Eldridge	66	2.6	
Reform	Robin Williams	54	2.1	
Turnout			40.6	
Conservative hold				
Conservative hold				

== See also ==
- List of electoral wards in Greater London
