= William Morris (ward) =

Electoral ward in London, England

- Electoral ward for the Waltham Forest London Borough Council
- Borough: London Borough of Waltham Forest
- County: Greater London
- Population: 15,059 (2021)
- Area: 0.9684 km²

Current electoral ward
- Created: 2002
- Seats: 3

William Morris is an electoral ward in the London Borough of Waltham Forest. The ward was first used in the 2002 elections and elects three councillors to Waltham Forest London Borough Council.

== Geography ==
The ward is named after the Walthamstow-born artist William Morris

== Councillors ==
Election	Councillors		
2022	Jack Phipps (Labour and Co-op)	Kizzy Gardiner (Labour and Co-op)	Grace Williams (Labour)

== Elections ==
=== 2022 ===
William Morris (3)
Party	Candidate	Votes	%	±%
Labour Co-op	Kizzy Gardiner	2,654	83.1	
Labour Co-op	Grace Williams	2,563	80.2	
Labour Co-op	Jack Phipps	2,073	64.9	
Green	Henry Greenwood	1,126	35.2	
Conservative	Hamza Ali	327	10.2	
TUSC	Paula Mitchell	295	9.2	
Conservative	Shaeb Khan	279	8.7	
Conservative	Anmol Seher	266	8.3	
Turnout			35.0	
Labour Co-op hold				
Labour Co-op hold				
Labour Co-op hold				

== See also ==
- List of electoral wards in Greater London
