= Waltham Forest London Borough Council =

Local authority for the London Borough of Waltham Forest

- Coat of arms

- Council logo

Type
- Type: London borough council of the London Borough of Waltham Forest
- Houses: Unicameral

History
- Founded: 1 April 1965

Leadership
- Mayor: Marcelo Hart-Camus, Green since 21 May 2026
- Leader: Paul Perkins, Green since 21 May 2026
- Chief Executive: Linzi Roberts-Egan since 31 July 2023

Structure
- Seats: 60 councillors
- Political groups: Administration (31) Green (31) Opposition (29) Labour (15) Conservative (14)
- Length of term: Whole council elected every four years

Elections
- Voting system: Plurality at-large (FPTP)
- Last election: 7 May 2026
- Next election: 2 May 2030

Motto
- "Fellowship is Life"

Meeting place
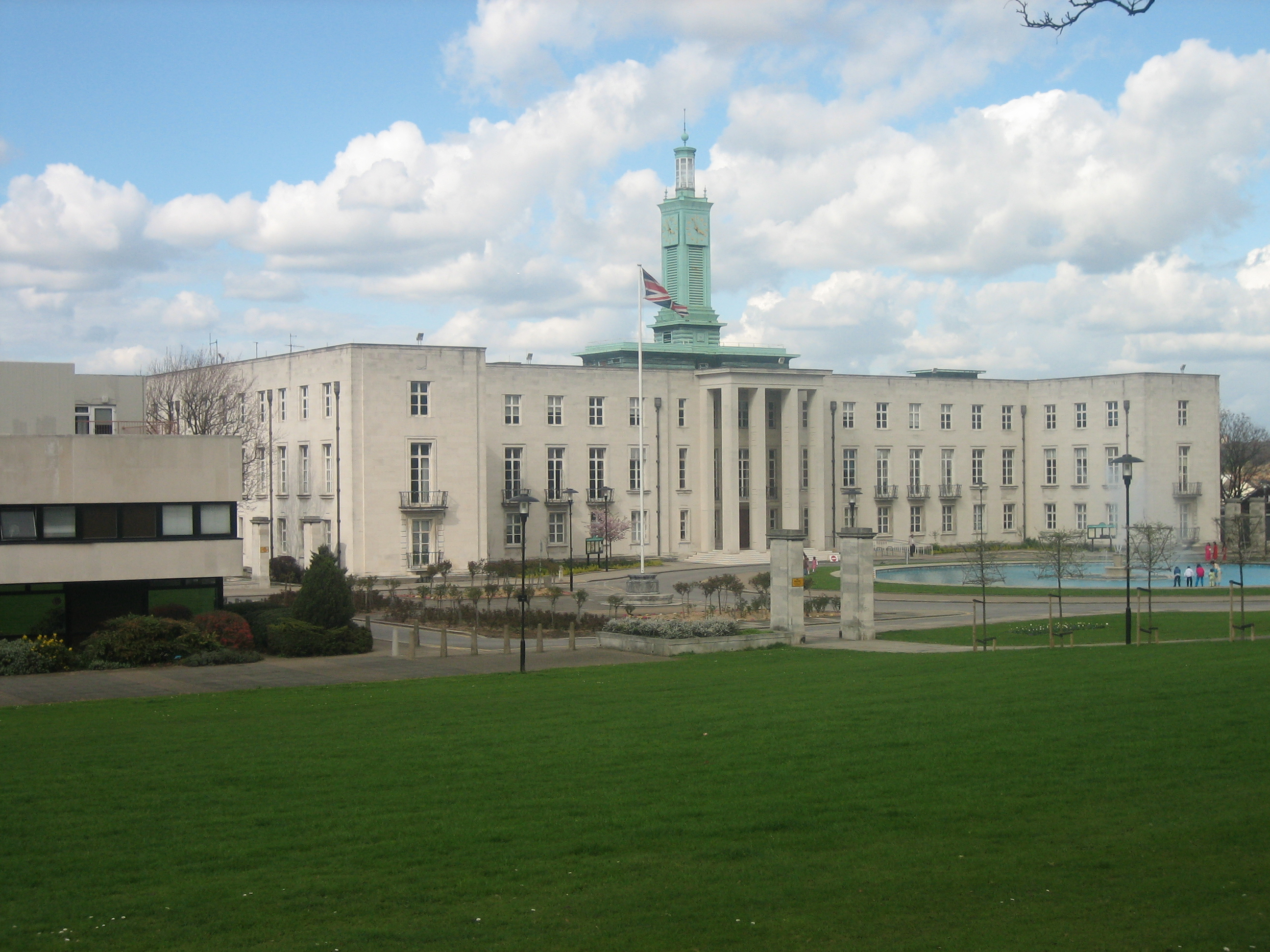
- Waltham Forest Town Hall, Forest Road, Walthamstow, London E17 4JF

Website
- www.walthamforest.gov.uk

Constitution
- Constitution

Waltham Forest London Borough Council, also known as Waltham Forest Council, is the local authority for the London Borough of Waltham Forest in London, England. The council is responsible for providing certain services within the borough. The council has been under Green Party majority control since 2026. The council is based at Waltham Forest Town Hall in Walthamstow.

== History ==
The London Borough of Waltham Forest and its council were created under the London Government Act 1963, with the first election held in 1964. For its first year the council acted as a shadow authority alongside the area's three outgoing authorities, being the municipal borough councils of Chingford, Leyton and Walthamstow. The new council formally came into its powers on 1 April 1965, at which point the old districts and their councils were abolished.

The council's full legal name is "The Mayor and Burgesses of the London Borough of Waltham Forest", but it styles itself Waltham Forest Council.

From 1965 until 1986 the council was a lower-tier authority, with upper-tier functions provided by the Greater London Council. The split of powers and functions meant that the Greater London Council was responsible for "wide area" services such as fire, ambulance, flood prevention, and refuse disposal; with the boroughs (including Waltham Forest) responsible for "personal" services such as social care, libraries, cemeteries and refuse collection. As an outer London borough council Waltham Forest has been a local education authority since 1965. The Greater London Council was abolished in 1986 and its functions passed to the London Boroughs, with some services provided through joint committees.

Since 2000 the Greater London Authority has taken some responsibility for highways and planning control from the council, but within the English local government system the council remains a "most purpose" authority in terms of the available range of powers and functions.

== Powers and functions ==
The local authority derives its powers and functions from the London Government Act 1963 and subsequent legislation, and has the powers and functions of a London borough council. It sets council tax and as a billing authority it also collects precepts for Greater London Authority functions and business rates. It sets planning policies which complement Greater London Authority and national policies, and decides on almost all planning applications accordingly. It is also the local education authority.

== Political control ==
The council has been under Green majority control by the Waltham Forest Green Party since 2026.

The first election was held in 1964, initially operating as a shadow authority alongside the outgoing authorities until it came into its powers on 1 April 1965. Political control of the council since 1965 has been as follows:

Party in control	Years
Labour	1965–1968
Conservative	1968–1971
Labour	1971–1982
No overall control	1982–1986
Labour	1986–1994
No overall control	1994–1998
Labour	1998–2002
No overall control	2002–2010
Labour	2010–2026
Green	2026–present

=== Leadership ===
The role of Mayor of Waltham Forest is largely ceremonial. Political leadership is instead provided by the leader of the council. The leaders since 1965 have been:

Councillor	Party	From	To
Herbert Palethorpe	Labour	1965	1968
Tom Brandon	Conservative	1968	1971
Bill Pearmine	Labour	1971	1982
Gerald King	Conservative	1982	1986
Neil Gerrard	Labour	1986	1990
Clive Morton	Labour	1990	1992
Evan Jones	Labour	1992	1994
Huw Morgan-Thomas	Labour	1994	1998
Tony Buckley	Labour	1998	30 Jul 2003
Clyde Loakes	Labour	30 Jul 2003	May 2009
Chris Robbins	Labour	21 May 2009	May 2017
Clare Coghill	Labour	25 May 2017	2 Sep 2021
Grace Williams	Labour	2 Sep 2021	May 2026
Paul Perkins	Green	21 May 2026	

=== Composition ===
Following the 2026 election, the composition of the council is:

Party	Councillors
Green	31
Labour	15
Conservative	14
Total	60

The next election is due in May 2030.

== Wards ==
The wards of Waltham Forest and number of councillors:

1. Cann Hall (3)
2. Cathall (2)
3. Chapel End (3)
4. Chingford Green (3)
5. Endlebury (2)
6. Forest (3)
7. Grove Green (3)
8. Hale End & Highams Park South (2)
9. Hatch Lane & Highams Park North (3)
10. High Street (3)
11. Higham Hill (3)
12. Hoe Street (3)
13. Larkswood (3)
14. Lea Bridge (3)
15. Leyton (3)
16. Leytonstone (3)
17. Markhouse (2)
18. St James (3)
19. Upper Walthamstow (2)
20. Valley (3)
21. William Morris (3)
22. Wood Street (2)

== Elections ==
Since the last boundary changes in 2022 the council has comprised 60 councillors representing 22 wards, with each ward electing two or three councillors. Elections are held every four years.

== Premises ==
The council is based at Waltham Forest Town Hall, formerly Walthamstow Town Hall, which had been completed in 1942 for the old Walthamstow Borough Council.
