= List of United Kingdom locations: Ce-Chap =

The United Kingdom

This is part of the list of United Kingdom locations: a gazetteer of place names in the United Kingdom showing each place's locality and geographical coordinates.

== Ce ==
Location	Locality	Coordinates (links to map & photo sources)	OS grid reference
Ceann a Bhaigh (Harris)	Western Isles	57.83°N 06.87°W	NG1193
Ceann a Bhaigh (Scalpaigh)	Western Isles	57.85°N 06.67°W	NG2395
Ceann a' Chinich	Western Isles	58.20°N 06.37°W	NB4332
Ceann a' Ghàraidh	Western Isles	57.88°N 06.72°W	NG2098
Ceann a-Muigh Chuil	Western Isles	58.27°N 06.33°W	NB4640
Ceann a-staigh Chuil	Western Isles	58.26°N 06.31°W	NB4739
Ceann nam Buailtean	Western Isles	58.19°N 06.34°W	NB4531
Cearsiadair (Kershader)	Western Isles	58.08°N 06.51°W	NB3420
Cefn	City of Newport	51.58°N 03.05°W	ST2788
Cefn	Powys	52.68°N 03.09°W	SJ2610
Cefn Berain	Conwy	53.20°N 03.51°W	SH9969
Cefn-brith	Conwy	53.03°N 03.59°W	SH9350
Cefn-bryn-brain	Neath Port Talbot	51.80°N 03.82°W	SN7413
Cefn Bychan (Newbridge)	Caerphilly	51.66°N 03.14°W	ST2197
Cefn-bychan	Swansea	51.63°N 04.11°W	SS5495
Cefn-bychan	Wrexham	52.96°N 03.08°W	SJ2741
Cefncaeau	Carmarthenshire	51.67°N 04.12°W	SS5399
Cefn Canol	Powys	52.87°N 03.14°W	SJ2331
Cefn-coch	Conwy	53.19°N 03.70°W	SH8668
Cefn Coch	Powys	52.60°N 03.41°W	SJ0402
Cefn-coed-y-cymmer	Merthyr Tydfil	51.76°N 03.40°W	SO0308
Cefn-crib	Caerphilly	51.68°N 03.11°W	ST2399
Cefn Cribwr	Bridgend	51.52°N 03.65°W	SS8582
Cefn Cross	Bridgend	51.52°N 03.64°W	SS8682
Cefnddwysarn	Gwynedd	52.92°N 03.54°W	SH9638
Cefn Einion	Shropshire	52.46°N 03.06°W	SO2886
Cefneithin	Carmarthenshire	51.79°N 04.10°W	SN5513
Cefn-eurgain	Flintshire	53.19°N 03.16°W	SJ2267
Cefn Fforest	Caerphilly	51.66°N 03.21°W	ST1697
Cefn Glas	Bridgend	51.50°N 03.60°W	SS8980
Cefn Golau	Blaenau Gwent	51.76°N 03.26°W	SO1308
Cefn-gorwydd	Powys	52.09°N 03.60°W	SN9045
Cefn-hengoed	Swansea	51.63°N 03.90°W	SS6895
Cefn Hengoed	Caerphilly	51.64°N 03.24°W	ST1495
Cefn Llwyd	Ceredigion	52.42°N 04.00°W	SN6483
Cefn-mawr	Wrexham	52.97°N 03.07°W	SJ2842
Cefnpennar	Rhondda, Cynon, Taff	51.69°N 03.40°W	SO0300
Cefn Rhigos	Rhondda, Cynon, Taff	51.74°N 03.58°W	SN9106
Cefn-y-bedd	Wrexham	53.09°N 03.03°W	SJ3156
Cefn-y-Garth	Swansea	51.68°N 03.88°W	SN7000
Cefn-y-pant	Carmarthenshire	51.89°N 04.63°W	SN1925
Cegidfa	Powys	52.69°N 03.15°W	SJ2211
Ceinewydd	Ceredigion	52.20°N 04.37°W	SN3859
Ceinws	Powys	52.62°N 03.83°W	SH7605
Cellan	Ceredigion	52.12°N 04.03°W	SN6149
Cellardyke	Fife	56.21°N 02.69°W	NO5703
Cellar Head	Western Isles	58.42°N 06.18°W	NB560564
Cellarhead	Staffordshire	53.02°N 02.07°W	SJ9547
Cellarhill	Kent	51.32°N 00.79°E	TQ9562
Celyn-Mali	Flintshire	53.18°N 03.24°W	SJ1766
Cemaes	Isle of Anglesey	53.40°N 04.46°W	SH3693
Cemaes Head	Pembrokeshire	52.11°N 04.72°W	SN134496
Cemmaes	Powys	52.63°N 03.73°W	SH8306
Cemmaes Road	Powys	52.62°N 03.74°W	SH8204
Cenarth	Carmarthenshire	52.04°N 04.53°W	SN2641
Central	Inverclyde	55.93°N 04.77°W	NS2775
Central Milton Keynes	Milton Keynes	52.03°N 00.77°W	SP8438
Ceos	Western Isles	58.09°N 06.49°W	NB3521
Ceres	Fife	56.28°N 02.97°W	NO4011
Cerne Abbas	Dorset	50.80°N 02.48°W	ST6601
Cerney Wick	Gloucestershire	51.66°N 01.90°W	SU0796
Cerrigceinwen	Isle of Anglesey	53.23°N 04.36°W	SH4273
Cerrig Llwydion	Neath Port Talbot	51.63°N 03.76°W	SS7894
Cerrig Mân	Isle of Anglesey	53.39°N 04.33°W	SH4591
Cerrigydrudion	Conwy	53.01°N 03.56°W	SH9548
Cess	Norfolk	52.69°N 01.60°E	TG4417
Ceunant	Gwynedd	53.12°N 04.19°W	SH5361

== Ch ==
=== Cha ===
==== Chac-Chan ====
Location	Locality	Coordinates (links to map & photo sources)	OS grid reference
Chaceley	Gloucestershire	51.96°N 02.21°W	SO8530
Chaceley Hole	Gloucestershire	51.96°N 02.23°W	SO8430
Chaceley Stock	Gloucestershire	51.95°N 02.20°W	SO8629
Chacewater	Cornwall	50.25°N 05.15°W	SW7544
Chackmore	Buckinghamshire	52.00°N 01.01°W	SP6835
Chacombe	Northamptonshire	52.08°N 01.28°W	SP4943
Chadbury	Worcestershire	52.11°N 01.98°W	SP0146
Chadderton	Oldham	53.54°N 02.15°W	SD9005
Chadderton Fold	Oldham	53.55°N 02.16°W	SD8906
Chaddesden	City of Derby	52.92°N 01.45°W	SK3737
Chaddesley Corbett	Worcestershire	52.35°N 02.16°W	SO8973
Chaddlehanger	Devon	50.57°N 04.17°W	SX4677
Chaddlewood	Devon	50.38°N 04.04°W	SX5556
Chaddleworth	Berkshire	51.49°N 01.41°W	SU4177
Chadkirk	Stockport	53.39°N 02.09°W	SJ9489
Chadlington	Oxfordshire	51.88°N 01.53°W	SP3221
Chadshunt	Warwickshire	52.16°N 01.50°W	SP3452
Chadsmoor	Staffordshire	52.69°N 02.03°W	SJ9811
Chadstone	Northamptonshire	52.21°N 00.75°W	SP8558
Chad Valley	Birmingham	52.46°N 01.94°W	SP0485
Chadwell	Leicestershire	52.80°N 00.84°W	SK7824
Chadwell	Shropshire	52.72°N 02.32°W	SJ7814
Chadwell End	Bedfordshire	52.27°N 00.41°W	TL0865
Chadwell Heath	Barking and Dagenham	51.57°N 00.13°E	TQ4888
Chadwell St Mary	Essex	51.47°N 00.36°E	TQ6478
Chadwick	Worcestershire	52.31°N 02.25°W	SO8369
Chadwick End	Warwickshire	52.35°N 01.70°W	SP2073
Chadwick Green	St Helens	53.48°N 02.70°W	SJ5399
Chaffcombe	Somerset	50.88°N 02.92°W	ST3510
Chafford Hundred	Essex	51.48°N 00.28°E	TQ5979
Chagford	Devon	50.66°N 03.84°W	SX7087
Chailey	East Sussex	50.95°N 00.02°W	TQ3919
Chain Bridge	Lincolnshire	52.96°N 00.06°W	TF3043
Chainbridge	Cambridgeshire	52.57°N 00.09°E	TF4200
Chainhurst	Kent	51.19°N 00.47°E	TQ7347
Chalbury	Dorset	50.85°N 01.98°W	SU0106
Chalbury Common	Dorset	50.85°N 01.97°W	SU0206
Chaldon	Surrey	51.27°N 00.12°W	TQ3155
Chaldon Herring / East Chaldon	Dorset	50.64°N 02.29°W	SY7983
Chale	Isle of Wight	50.59°N 01.32°W	SZ4877
Chale Green	Isle of Wight	50.60°N 01.32°W	SZ4879
Chalfont Common	Buckinghamshire	51.61°N 00.55°W	TQ0092
Chalfont Grove	Buckinghamshire	51.60°N 00.58°W	SU9891
Chalfont St Giles	Buckinghamshire	51.62°N 00.58°W	SU9893
Chalfont St Peter	Buckinghamshire	51.60°N 00.55°W	TQ0090
Chalford	Gloucestershire	51.71°N 02.16°W	SO8902
Chalford	Oxfordshire	51.69°N 00.97°W	SP7100
Chalford	Wiltshire	51.24°N 02.20°W	ST8650
Chalford Hill	Gloucestershire	51.72°N 02.16°W	SO8903
Chalgrave	Bedfordshire	51.93°N 00.53°W	TL0127
Chalgrove	Oxfordshire	51.65°N 01.09°W	SU6396
Chalk	Kent	51.43°N 00.40°E	TQ6773
Chalk End	Essex	51.76°N 00.36°E	TL6310
Chalkfoot	Cumbria	54.82°N 03.04°W	NY3348
Chalkhill	Norfolk	52.57°N 00.72°E	TF8501
Chalkhouse Green	Oxfordshire	51.49°N 00.97°W	SU7178
Chalkshire	Buckinghamshire	51.75°N 00.78°W	SP8407
Chalksole	Kent	51.14°N 01.21°E	TR2543
Chalkway	Somerset	50.85°N 02.89°W	ST3707
Chalkwell	Essex	51.53°N 00.66°E	TQ8585
Chalkwell	Kent	51.34°N 00.71°E	TQ8964
Challaborough	Devon	50.28°N 03.89°W	SX6544
Challacombe	Devon	51.14°N 03.87°W	SS6940
Challister	Shetland Islands	60.36°N 00.98°W	HU5665
Challoch	Dumfries and Galloway	54.97°N 04.53°W	NX3867
Challock	Kent	51.21°N 00.86°E	TR0050
Chalmington	Dorset	50.79°N 02.58°W	ST5900
Chalton	Hampshire	50.93°N 00.96°W	SU7316
Chalton (Moggerhanger)	Bedfordshire	52.13°N 00.33°W	TL1450
Chalton (near Luton)	Bedfordshire	51.92°N 00.50°W	TL0326
Chalvedon	Essex	51.56°N 00.49°E	TQ7388
Chalvey	Berkshire	51.50°N 00.61°W	SU9679
Chalvington	East Sussex	50.86°N 00.15°E	TQ5209
Chambercombe	Devon	51.20°N 04.12°W	SS5247
Chambers' Green	Kent	51.15°N 00.74°E	TQ9243
Champernhayes Marsh	Dorset	50.76°N 02.92°W	SY3597
Champson	Devon	51.03°N 03.71°W	SS8028
Chance Inn	Fife	56.27°N 03.01°W	NO3710
Chancery	Ceredigion	52.36°N 04.08°W	SN5876
Chance's Pitch	Herefordshire	52.05°N 02.38°W	SO7440
Chandler's Cross	Hertfordshire	51.67°N 00.46°W	TQ0698
Chandler's Cross	Worcestershire	52.04°N 02.33°W	SO7738
Chandler's Ford	Hampshire	50.97°N 01.38°W	SU4320
Chandlers Green	Hampshire	51.31°N 00.99°W	SU7058
Channel's End	Bedfordshire	52.19°N 00.37°W	TL1156
Channerwick	Shetland Islands	59.99°N 01.28°W	HU4023
Chanonry Point	Highland	57.58°N 04.10°W	NH740564
Chantry	Devon	50.98°N 04.02°W	SS5823
Chantry	Somerset	51.22°N 02.40°W	ST7247
Chantry	Suffolk	52.04°N 01.11°E	TM1443

==== Chap ====
Location	Locality	Coordinates (links to map & photo sources)	OS grid reference
Chapel	Cornwall	50.40°N 05.04°W	SW8460
Chapel	Cumbria	54.66°N 03.21°W	NY2231
Chapel	Fife	56.12°N 03.20°W	NT2593
Chapel Allerton	Somerset	51.24°N 02.86°W	ST4050
Chapel Allerton	Leeds	53.82°N 01.54°W	SE3037
Chapel Amble	Cornwall	50.54°N 04.83°W	SW9975
Chapel Brampton	Northamptonshire	52.28°N 00.94°W	SP7266
Chapel Chorlton	Staffordshire	52.93°N 02.28°W	SJ8137
Chapel Cleeve	Somerset	51.16°N 03.38°W	ST0342
Chapel Cross	East Sussex	50.95°N 00.29°E	TQ6120
Chapel End	Cambridgeshire	52.42°N 00.35°W	TL1282
Chapel End	Northamptonshire	52.46°N 00.36°W	TL1187
Chapel End	Warwickshire	52.53°N 01.52°W	SP3293
Chapel End (Colmworth)	Bedfordshire	52.20°N 00.39°W	TL1058
Chapel End (Cardington)	Bedfordshire	52.11°N 00.40°W	TL0948
Chapel End (Houghton Conquest)	Bedfordshire	52.06°N 00.46°W	TL0542
Chapel End	Essex	51.89°N 00.26°E	TL5624
Chapel End	Cheshire	52.98°N 02.49°W	SJ6743
Chapel End	Greater London	51.59°N 0.015°W	
Chapel-en-le-Frith	Derbyshire	53.31°N 01.92°W	SK0580
Chapel Field	Bury	53.55°N 02.31°W	SD7906
Chapel Field	Norfolk	52.76°N 01.49°E	TG3624
Chapel Fields	Coventry	52.40°N 01.54°W	SP3179
Chapel Fields	York	53.95°N 01.14°W	SE5651
Chapelgate	Lincolnshire	52.79°N 00.08°E	TF4124
Chapel Green	Solihull	52.46°N 01.61°W	SP2685
Chapel Green	Warwickshire	52.23°N 01.32°W	SP4660
Chapel Green	Hertfordshire	51.99°N 00.04°W	TL3435
Chapel Haddlesey	North Yorkshire	53.72°N 01.12°W	SE5826
Chapelhall	North Lanarkshire	55.83°N 03.94°W	NS7862
Chapel Head	Cambridgeshire	52.41°N 00.03°W	TL3481
Chapel Hill	Aberdeenshire	57.40°N 01.90°W	NK0635
Chapel Hill	Gloucestershire	51.71°N 02.56°W	SO6102
Chapel Hill	Lincolnshire	53.07°N 00.21°W	TF2054
Chapel Hill	Monmouthshire	51.69°N 02.69°W	SO5200
Chapel Hill	North Yorkshire	53.91°N 01.48°W	SE340466
Chapelhill	Perth and Kinross	56.37°N 03.29°W	NO2021
Chapel House	Lancashire	53.54°N 02.80°W	SD4706
Chapel Knapp	Wiltshire	51.41°N 02.17°W	ST8868
Chapelknowe	Dumfries and Galloway	55.04°N 03.08°W	NY3173
Chapel Lawn	Shropshire	52.37°N 03.01°W	SO3176
Chapel-le-Dale	North Yorkshire	54.18°N 02.41°W	SD7377
Chapel Leigh	Somerset	51.05°N 03.25°W	ST1229
Chapel Mains	Scottish Borders	55.66°N 02.71°W	NT5542
Chapel Milton	Derbyshire	53.32°N 01.92°W	SK0581
Chapel of Ease	Caerphilly	51.64°N 03.12°W	ST2295
Chapel of Garioch	Aberdeenshire	57.29°N 02.48°W	NJ7123
Chapel of Stoneywood	City of Aberdeen	57.18°N 02.23°W	NJ8610
Chapel on Leader	Scottish Borders	55.66°N 02.71°W	NT5541
Chapel Plaister	Wiltshire	51.40°N 02.23°W	ST8467
Chapel Point	Cornwall	50.25°N 04.77°W	SX026432
Chapel Row	East Sussex	50.88°N 00.31°E	TQ6312
Chapel Row	Essex	51.67°N 00.58°E	TL7900
Chapel Row	Berkshire	51.41°N 01.18°W	SU5769
Chapels	Cumbria	54.23°N 03.18°W	SD2383
Chapels	Lancashire	53.70°N 02.47°W	SD6923
Chapel Stile	Cumbria	54.43°N 03.04°W	NY3205
Chapel St Leonards	Lincolnshire	53.22°N 00.32°E	TF5572
Chapelthorpe	Wakefield	53.63°N 01.53°W	SE3115
Chapelton	Devon	51.01°N 04.04°W	SS5726
Chapelton	South Lanarkshire	55.70°N 04.10°W	NS6848
Chapelton	Angus	56.61°N 02.62°W	NO6247
Chapelton	Aberdeenshire	57.03°N 02.18°W	NO8994
Chapel Town	Cornwall	50.35°N 04.98°W	SW8855
Chapeltown	Sheffield	53.46°N 01.47°W	SK3596
Chapeltown	Lancashire	53.63°N 02.40°W	SD7315
Chapeltown	Moray	57.27°N 03.26°W	NJ2421
Chapman's Hill	Worcestershire	52.39°N 02.06°W	SO9677
Chapmanslade	Wiltshire	51.22°N 02.25°W	ST8247
Chapman's Town	East Sussex	50.93°N 00.29°E	TQ6118
Chapmans Well	Devon	50.71°N 04.33°W	SX3593
Chapmore End	Hertfordshire	51.82°N 00.08°W	TL3216
Chappel	Essex	51.91°N 00.74°E	TL8928
