= Chantry (disambiguation) =

A chantry is a monetary trust fund established by pre-Reformation English churches.

Chantry may also refer to:

- Chantry, Devon, a location in England
- Chantry, Ontario, Canada
- Chantry, Somerset, a hamlet in Somerset, England
- Chantry, Suffolk, an area of Ipswich, Suffolk, England
  - The Chantry (Ipswich), a former mansion and current neurological care centre in Ipswich, Suffolk, England
- Art Chantry (born 1954), American graphic designer

== See also ==
- Chantry Island (disambiguation)
- Chantrey (disambiguation)
