= Windmill sail =

Aerofoil for converting wind energy to rotary motion

Windmills are powered by their sails. Sails are found in different forms, from primitive common sails to the advanced patent sails.

== Jib sails ==
The jib sail is found in Mediterranean countries and consists of a simple triangle of cloth wound round a spar. The mill must be stopped in order to adjust the reefing of the sail. Though rare in the UK, at least two windmills are known to have had jib sails (St Mary's, Isle of Scilly and Cann Mills, Melbury Abbas).

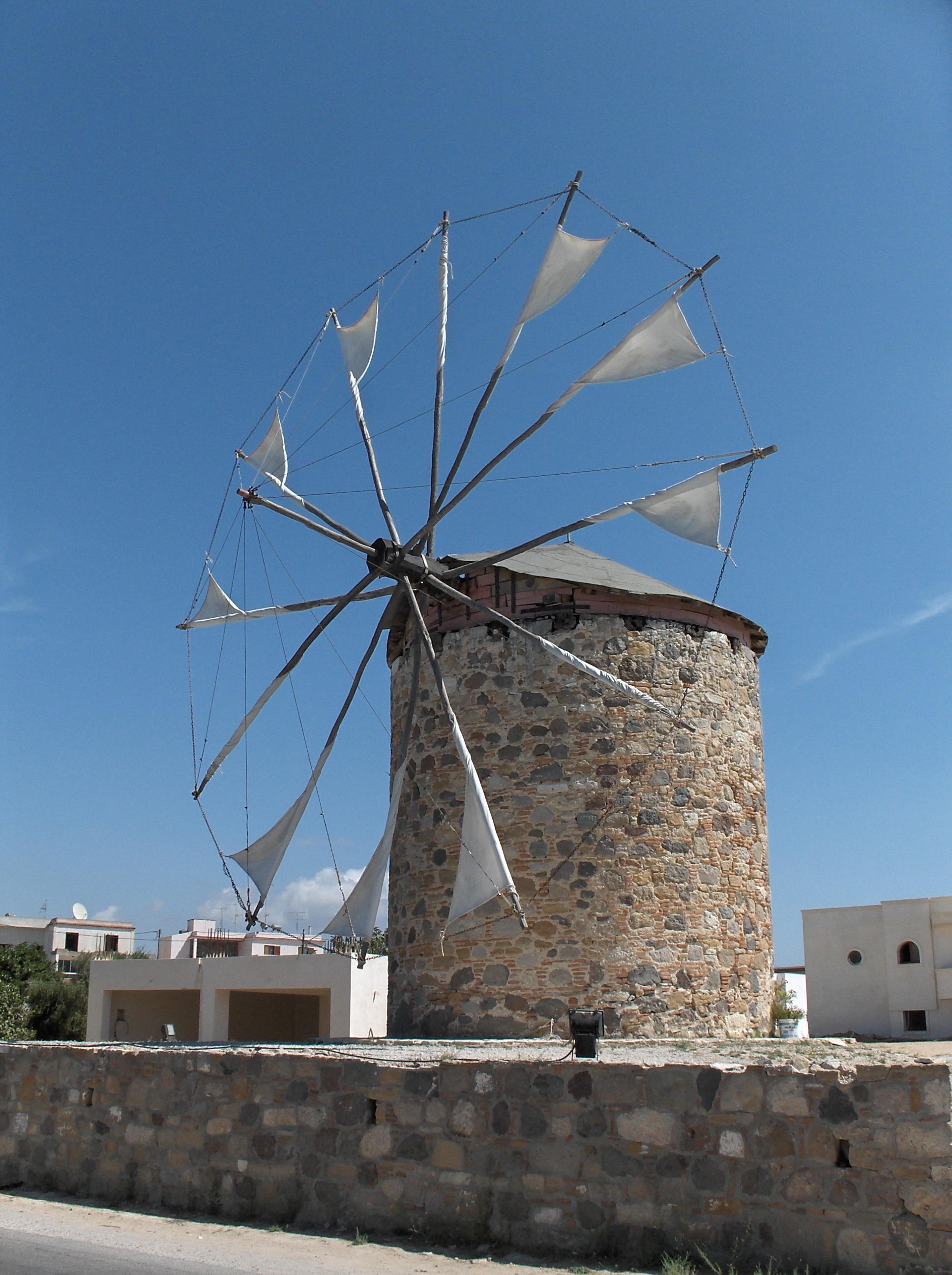
Jib sails

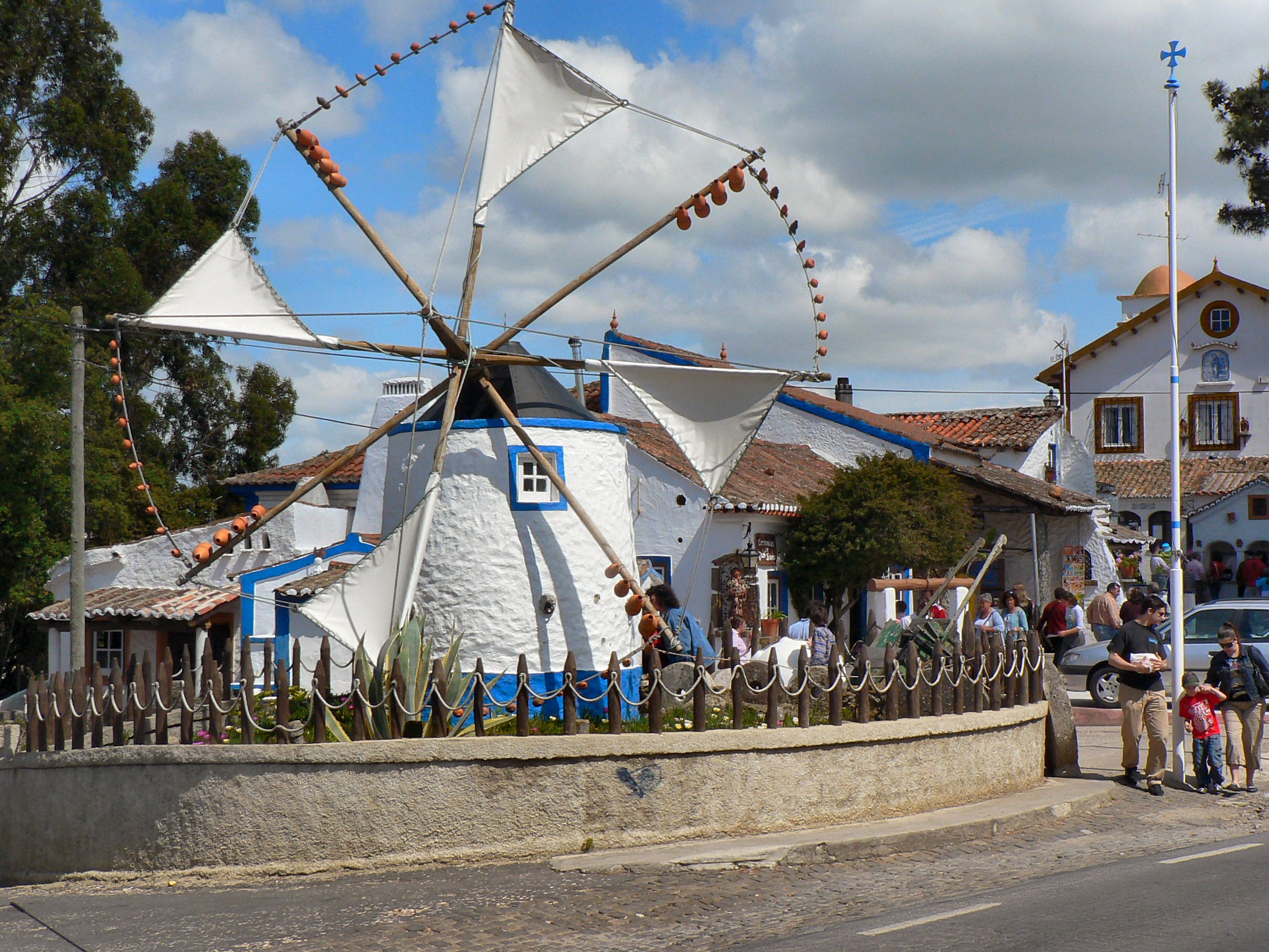
More fully spread

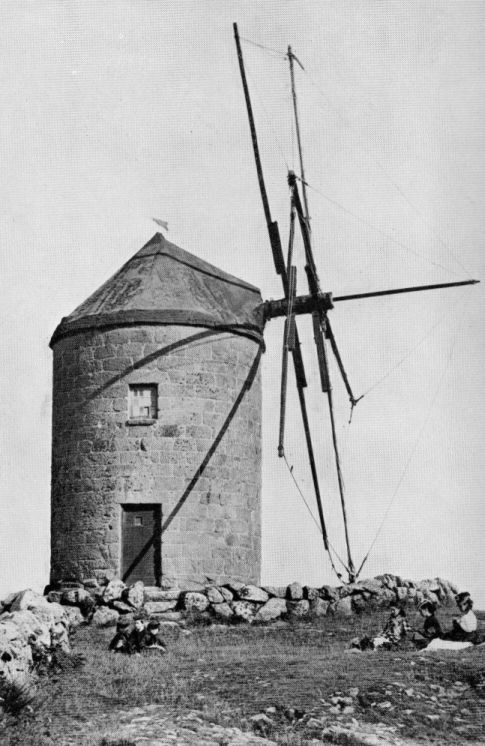
St Mary's, Isles of Scilly

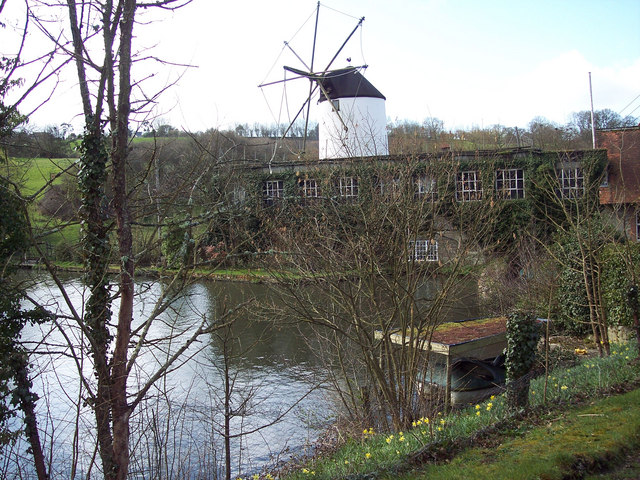
Cann Mills, Melbury Abbas

== Common sails ==
The common sail is the simplest form of sail. In medieval mills, the sailcloth was wound in and out of a ladder-type arrangement of sails. Medieval sails could be constructed with or without outer sailbars. Post-medieval mill sails have a lattice framework over which the sailcloth is spread. There are various "reefs" for the different spread of sails; these are full sail, dagger point, sword point and first reef. The mill must be stopped in order to adjust the reefing of the sail.

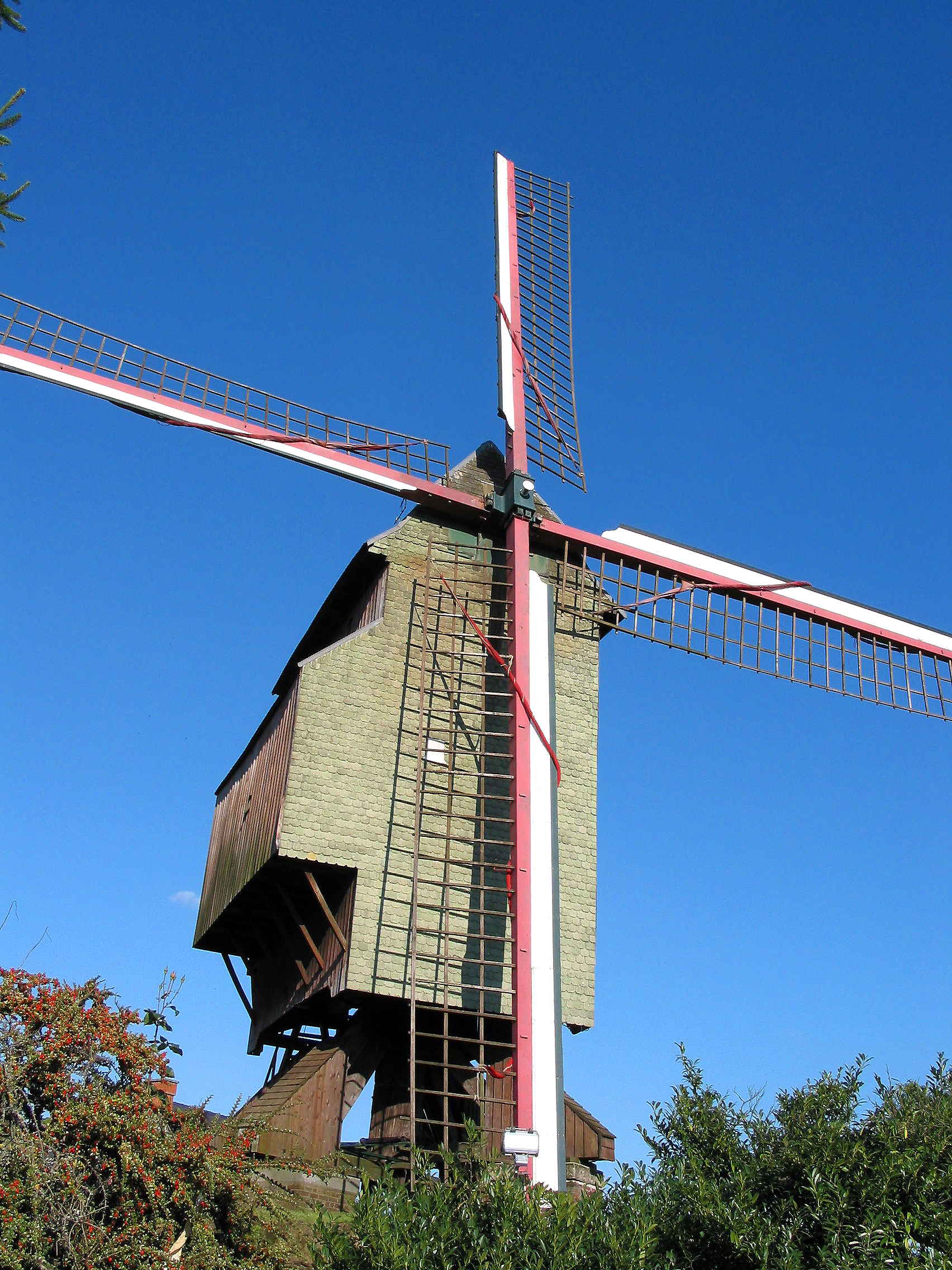
Furled

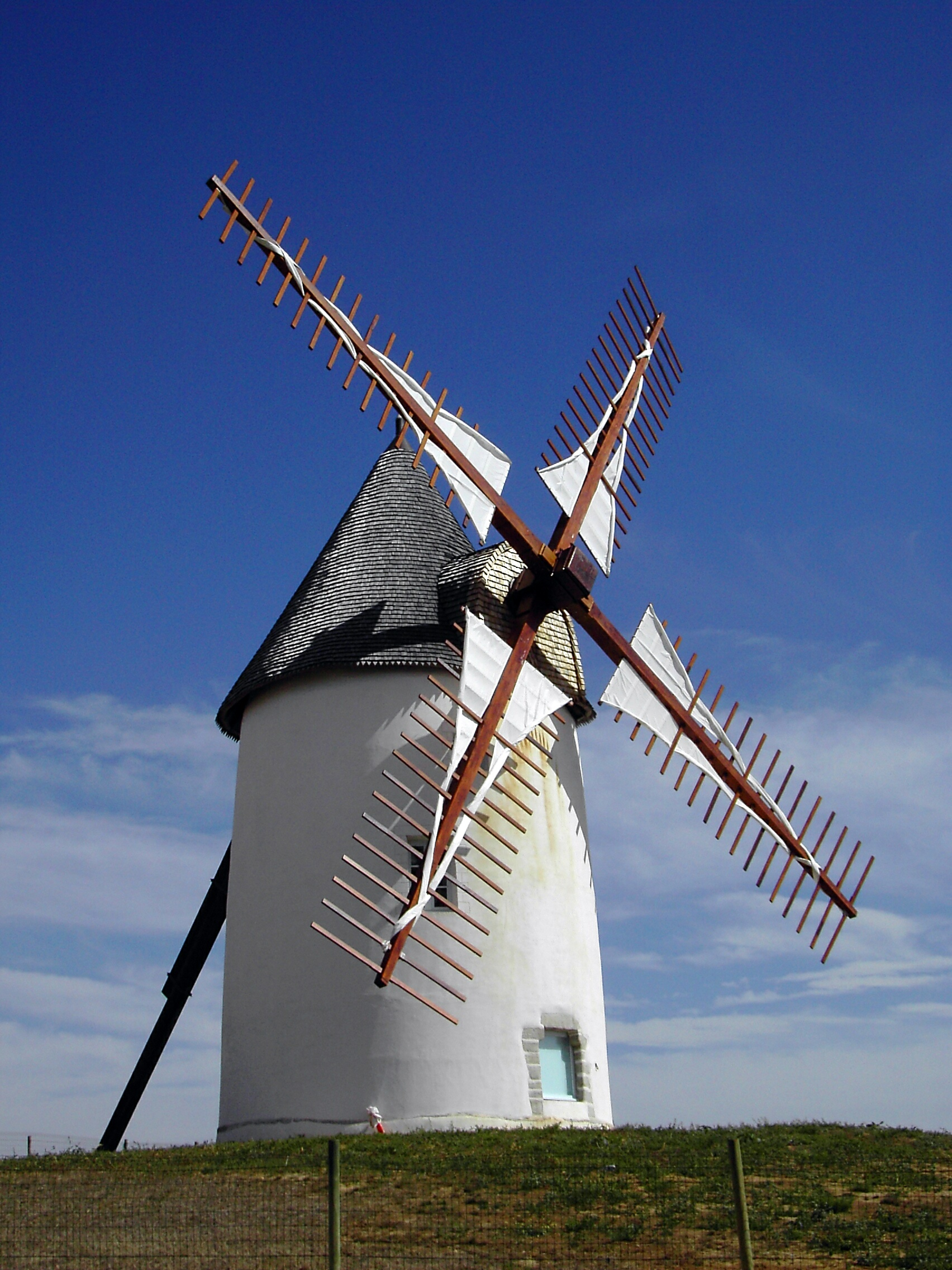
First reef (Medieval style sail)

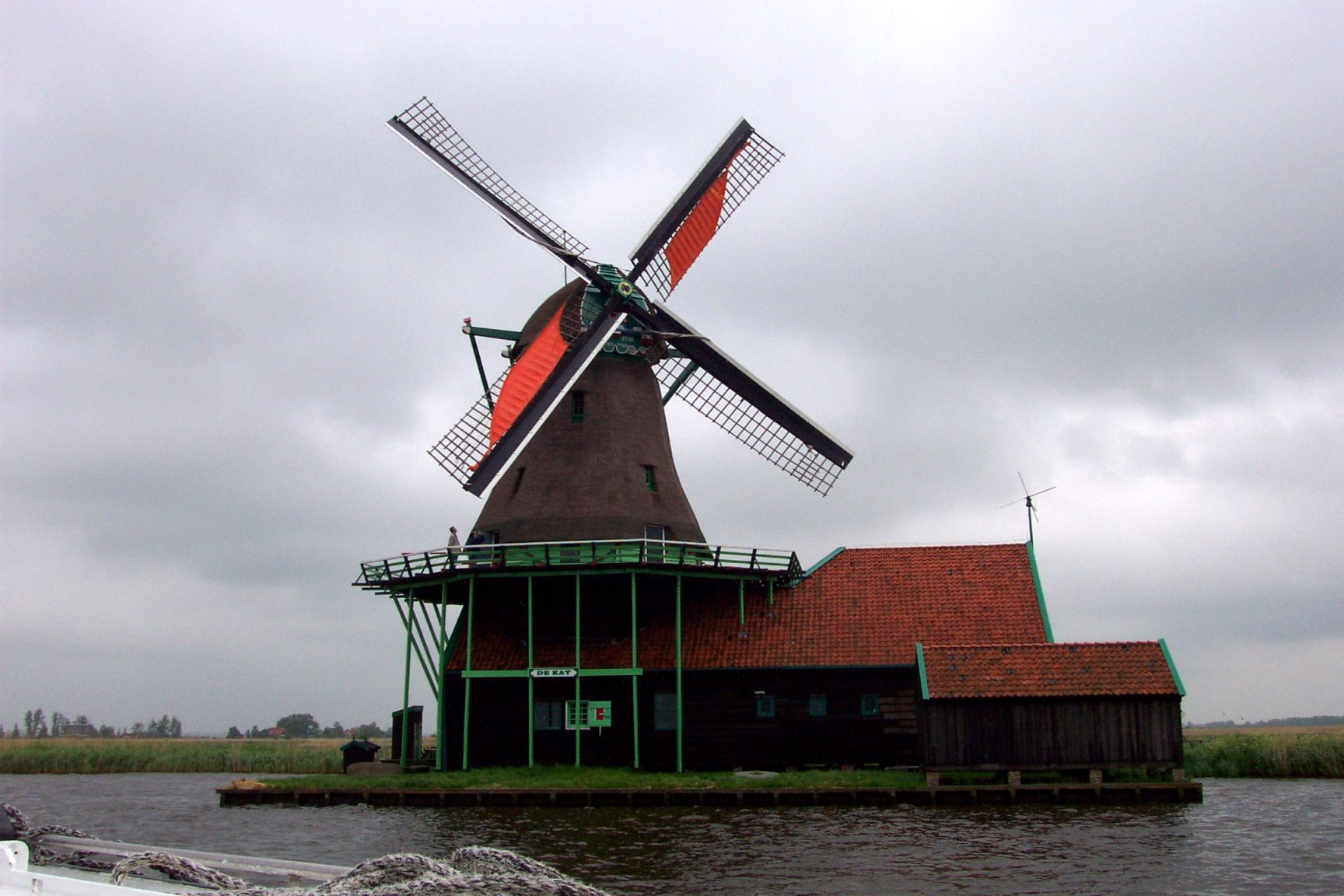
Sword point

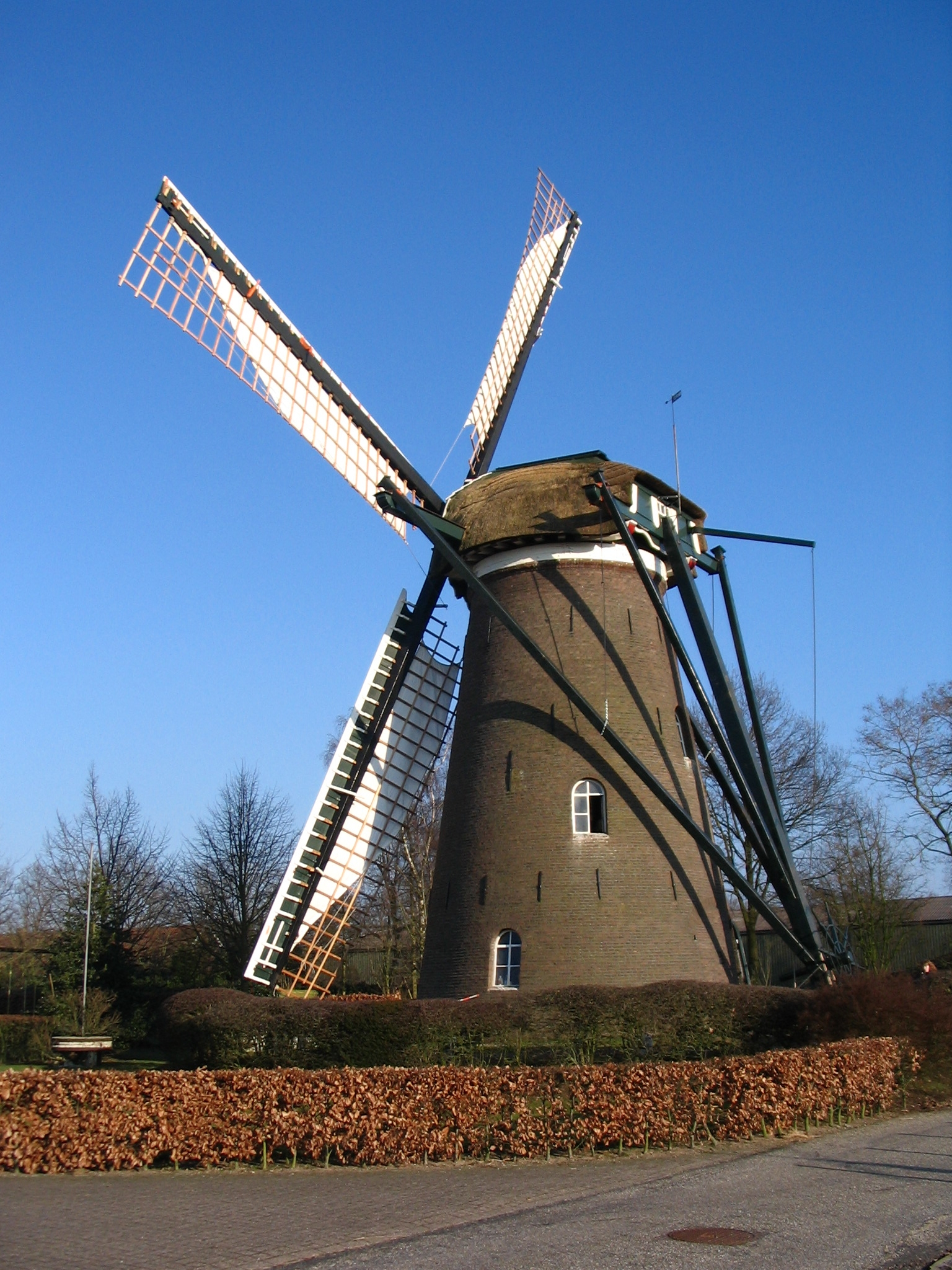
Dagger point

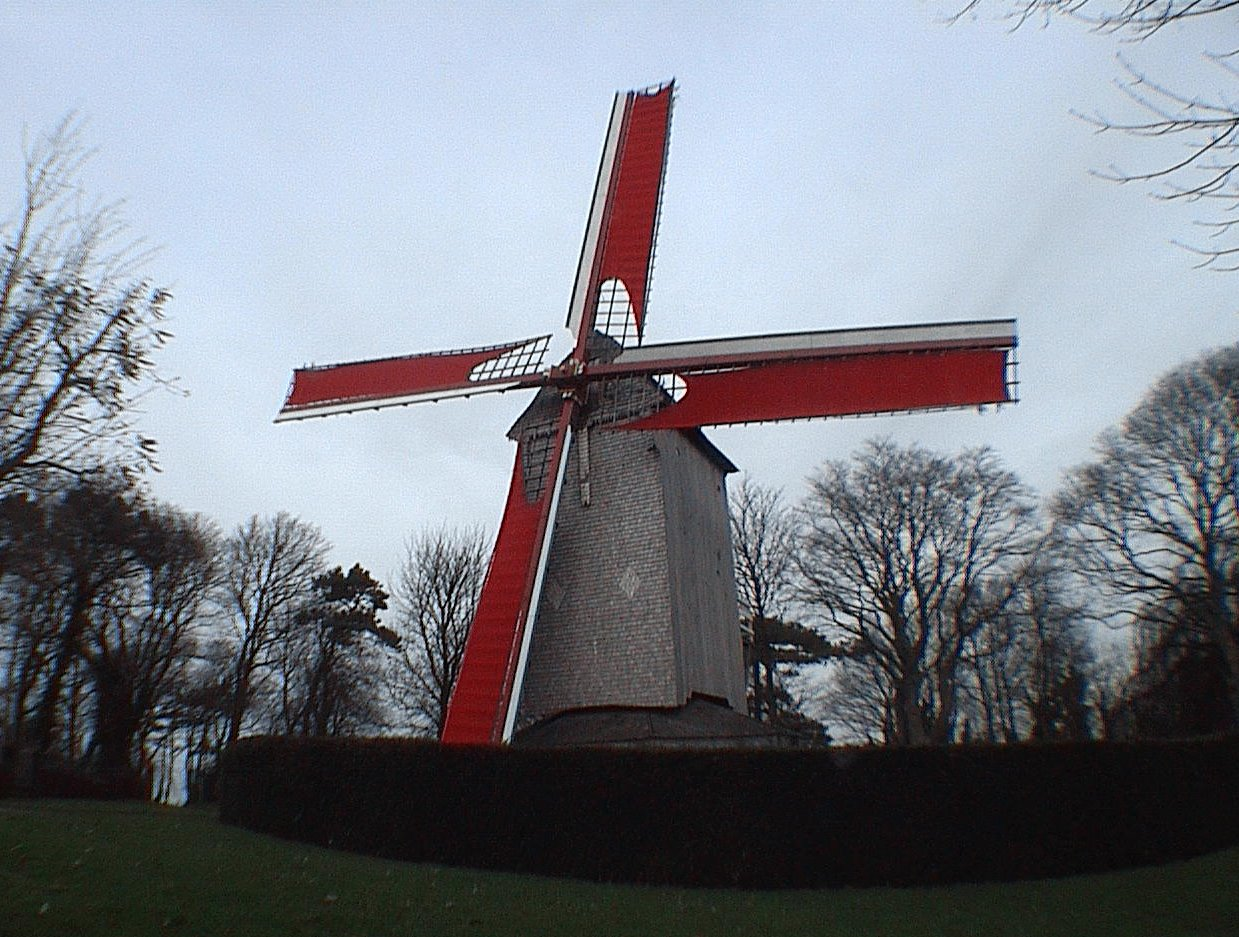
Full sail

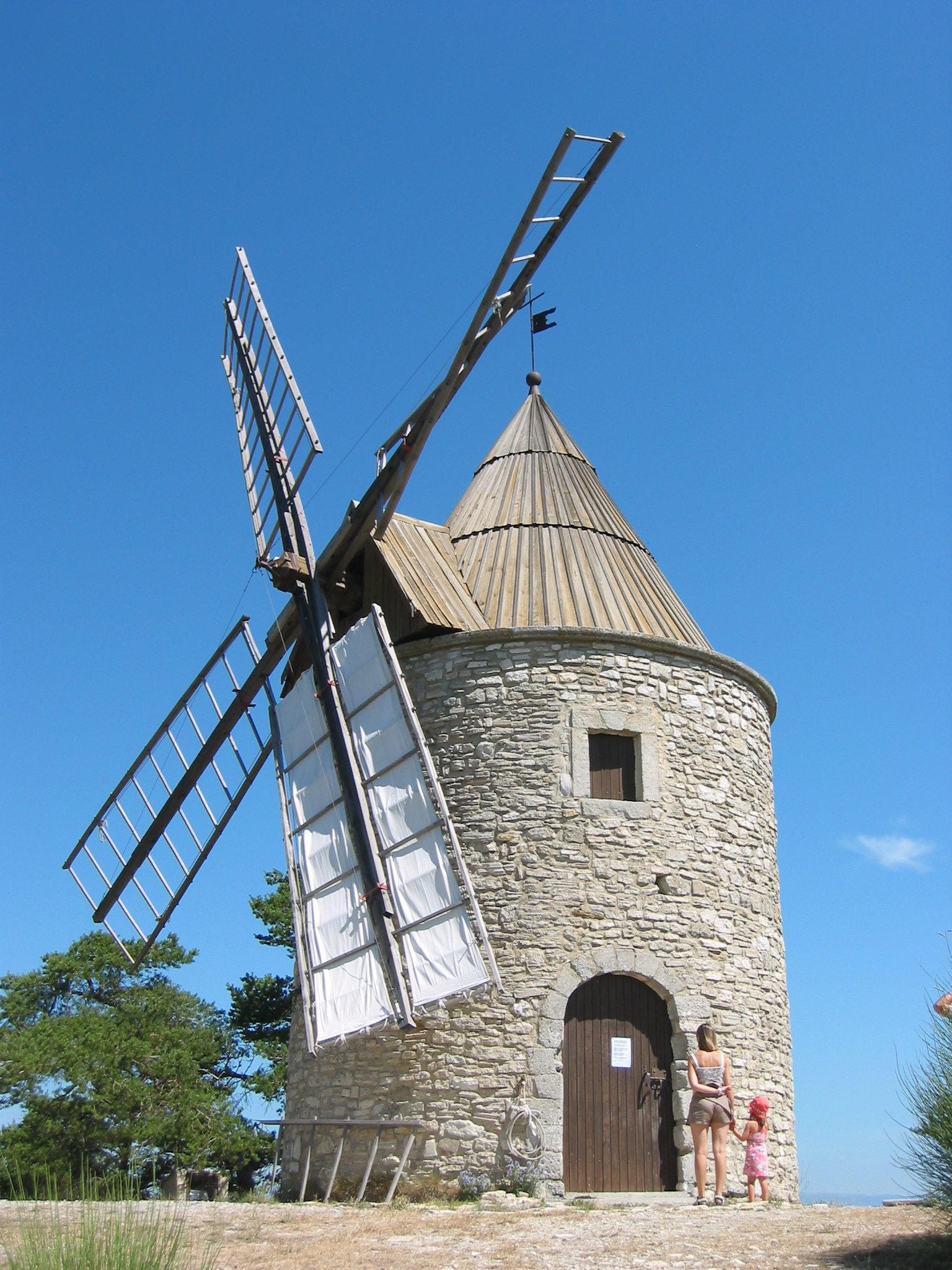
Full sail (Medieval style sail)

== Spring sails ==
Spring sails were invented by Scottish millwright Andrew Meikle in 1772. The sail is divided into a number of bays, each having a number of shutters. All the shutters are joined together by a shutter bar, and the force required for the wind to open the shutters is adjusted by a separate spring on each sail. Although automatic in operation, the mill must be stopped in order to adjust the reefing of the sail.

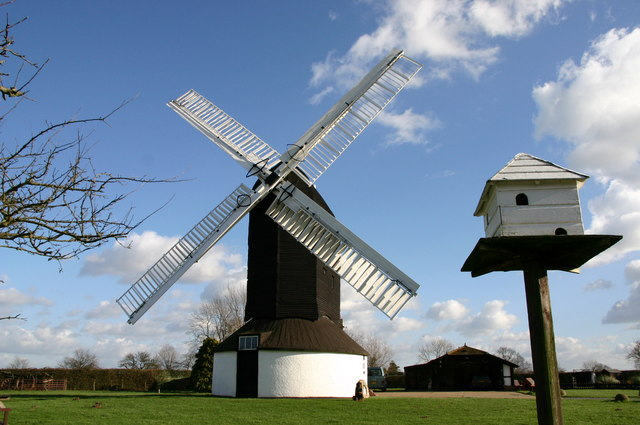
Open

== Roller reefing sails ==
Roller reefing sails were invented by Stephen Hooper in 1789. As with spring sails, the sail is divided into a number of bays, each with a number of spars with cloth wound around them. The cloth is extended or retracted by a rod and lever system, and connected with a shutter bar on each sail. Adjustment of the roller reefing sail can be made without stopping the mill. This type of sail was popular in Yorkshire, although the only remaining mill with roller reefing sails intact is Ballycopeland Windmill in Northern Ireland.

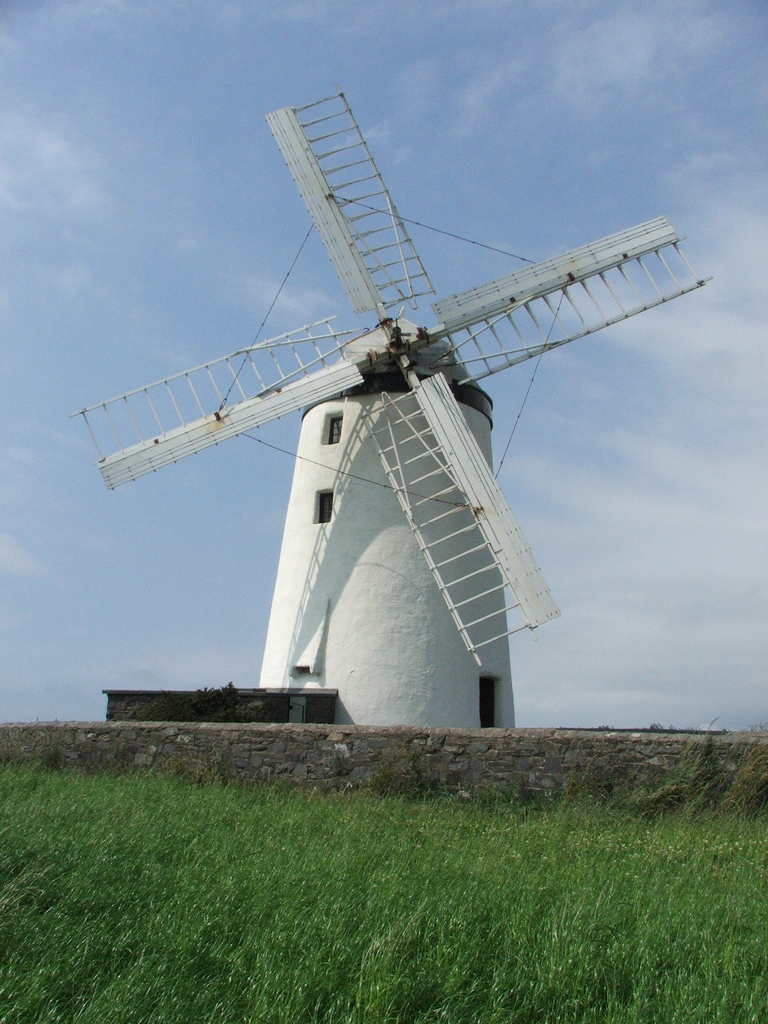
Furled

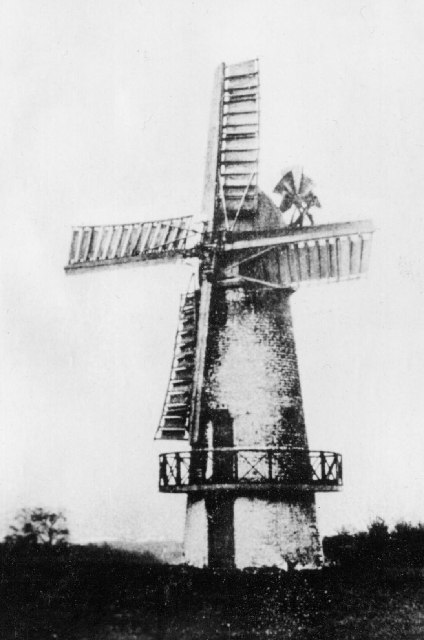
Unfurled

== Patent sails ==
Patent sails were invented by William Cubitt in 1807. They combine the shutters of the spring sail with automatic adjustment of the roller reefing sail. Their construction is similar to that of the spring sail. Adjustment of patent sails can be made without stopping the mill.

Air brakes

In 1860, the English millwright Catchpole fitted an automatic air brake to the ends of patent sails. These were longitudinal shutters at the tip of each sail, which opened up if the wind got too strong, thus slowing the sail.

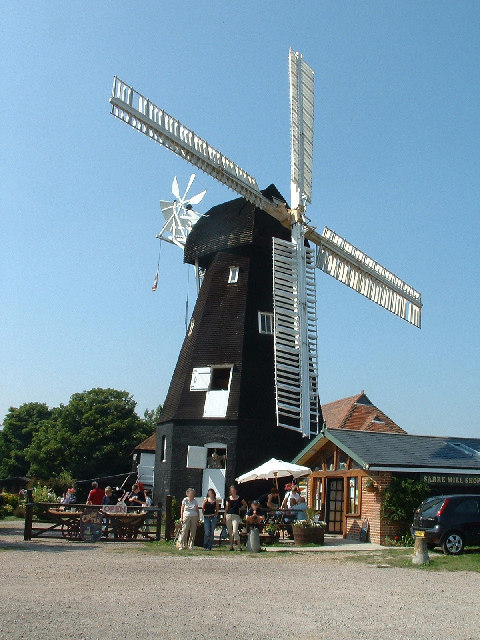
Open

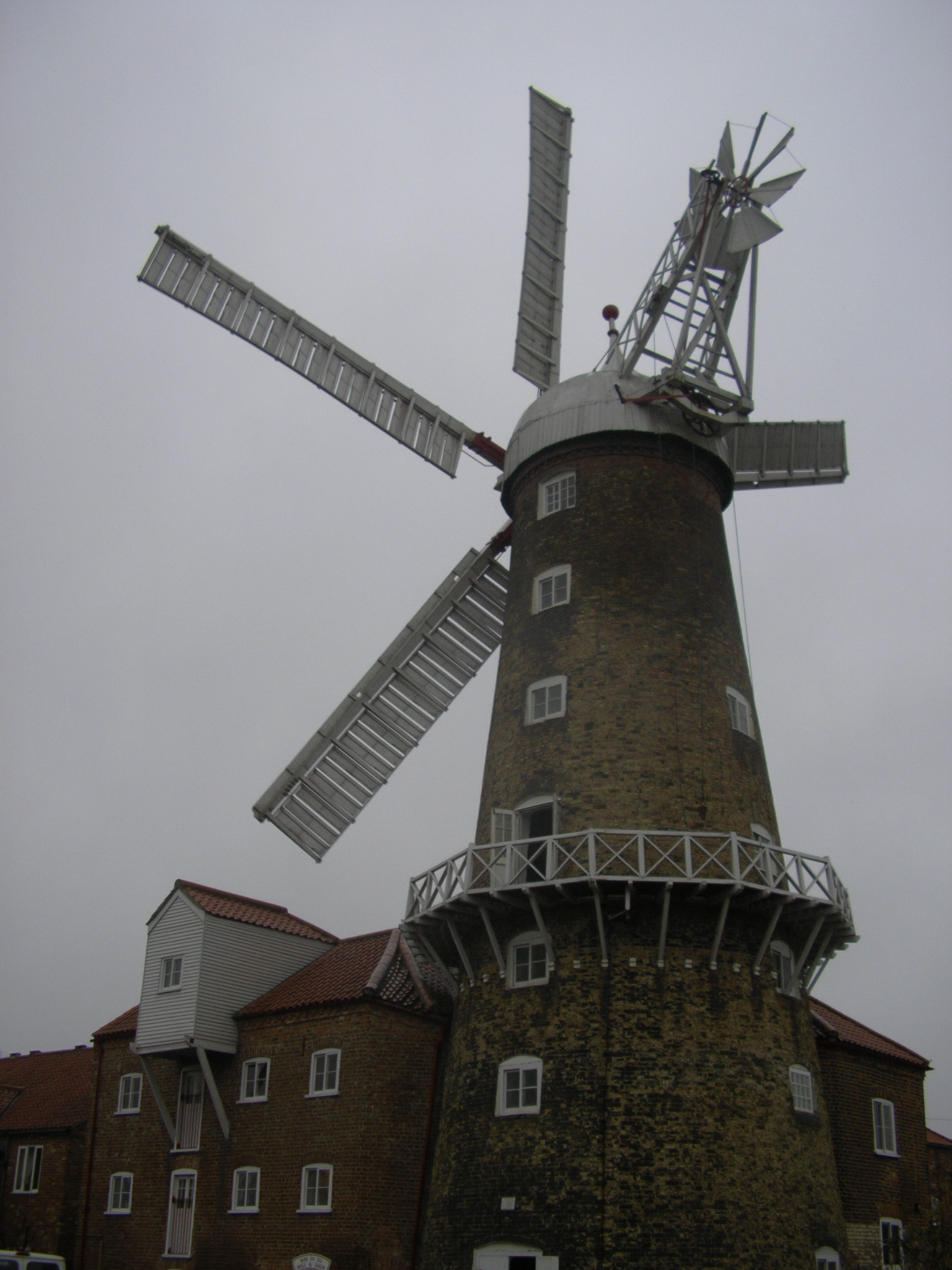
Closed

== Spring patent sails ==
Spring patent sails have a spring to enable each sail to be adjusted individually, with the patent sail system allowing all sails to be adjusted without stopping the mill. The system was not a common one.

== Dutch sail types ==
In the Netherlands, the common sail predominates. During the nineteenth and twentieth centuries, Dutch millwrights developed the windmill sail to make it more efficient aerodynamically and operation easier in an effort to keep the traditional windmill economically viable in competition with factories and electric pumping stations.

=== Dekker / Van Bussel system ===
The Dutch millwright A. J. Dekker improved on the efficiency of the common sail. The stock is given an airfoil shape by completely covering it with galvanised steel plates. Dekkerised sails provide enough surface area to be able to work the mill with no sailcloth spread if the wind is strong enough. As with the common sail, they are not adjustable except by adding more sailcloth. Some disadvantages of the Dekker system led millwright Van Bussel of Weert to invent a similar system, though with just a more rounded airfoil replacing the leading boards and not covering the stock itself.

=== Ten Have / Beckers ===
Invented by Dutch millwright Ten Have of Vorden, Ten Have sails have a small number of wide longitudinal shutters, operating by centrifugal weights and often also by the miller at the tail of the mill similar to patent sails. This way the sail can be adjusted without stopping the mill. The leading edge is commonly streamlined by the Van Bussel system. Ten Have shutters are normally only used on one stock as the wide Ten Have shutters standing open on a vertical stock would leave this stock vulnerable to side winds during a storm. Beckers sails are an alternative to Ten Have sails. Only two mills in the Netherlands were fitted with them.

=== Fauël or Fok system ===
The Fok system, invented by engineer P.L. Fauël, was inspired by the jib on a sailing boat ('fok' is the Dutch word for jib). In this design the leading boards are replaced by a rounded profile of wooden slats in the form of a foresail leaving a small slot between this profile and the stock. Its working principle can be compared to a leading edge slot on an aircraft wing. It enables the mill to work in a lower windspeed but in variable windspeeds tends to make it difficult to have the mill run at a steady pace. For this reason it is often equipped with air brakes operating by centrifugal force. The Fauël system is used in addition to common sails (see photo).

=== Bilau Ventisails/ Van Riet system ===
The Bilau system uses sails with a streamline covering of the stock, coupled with a full length air brake on the trailing edge, together forming an airfoil. The airbrake is opened by centrifugal weights in the sails but can also be operated by the miller similar to the patent system. When opening the airbrake disturbs the airfoil shape thereby slowing the mill. It was invented by German airplane engineer Kurt Bilau early in the twentieth century and became quite popular in Germany where it was fitted to over 140 mills. A similar system was invented by a millwright by the name of Van Riet of Goes where the leading edge and the airbrake together form a more complete airfoil.

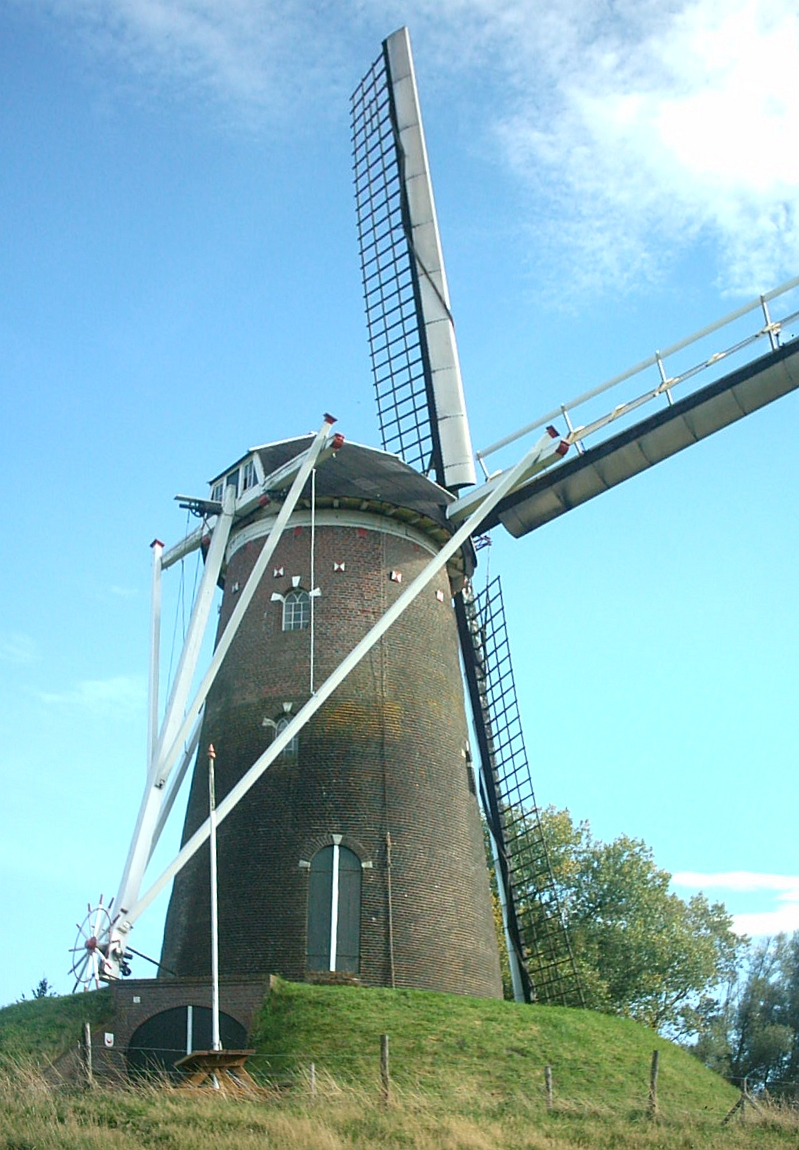
Ten Have sails open on one stock, common sails on the other, both with van Bussel system.

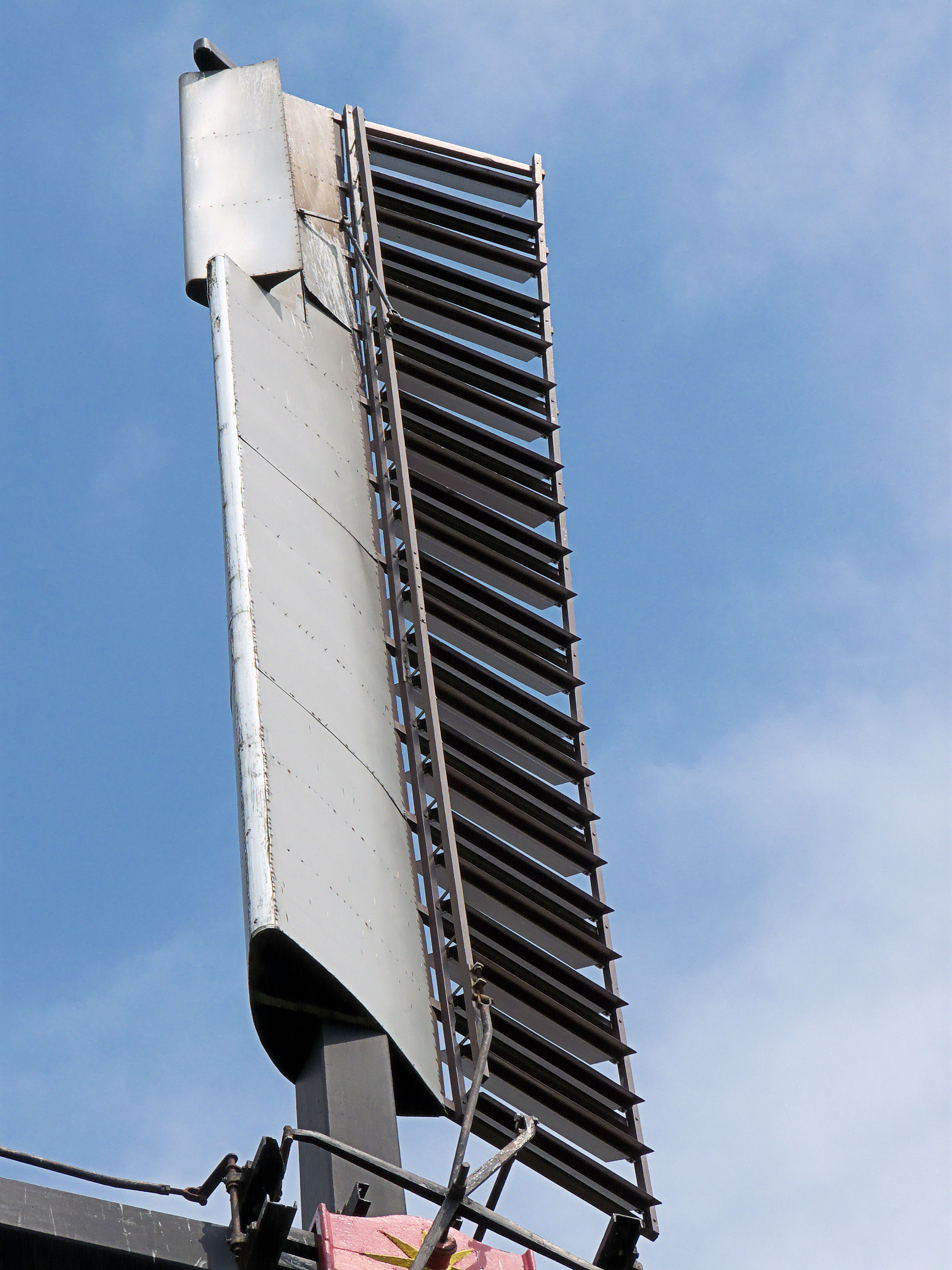
Dekkerised sails with air brake and patent system

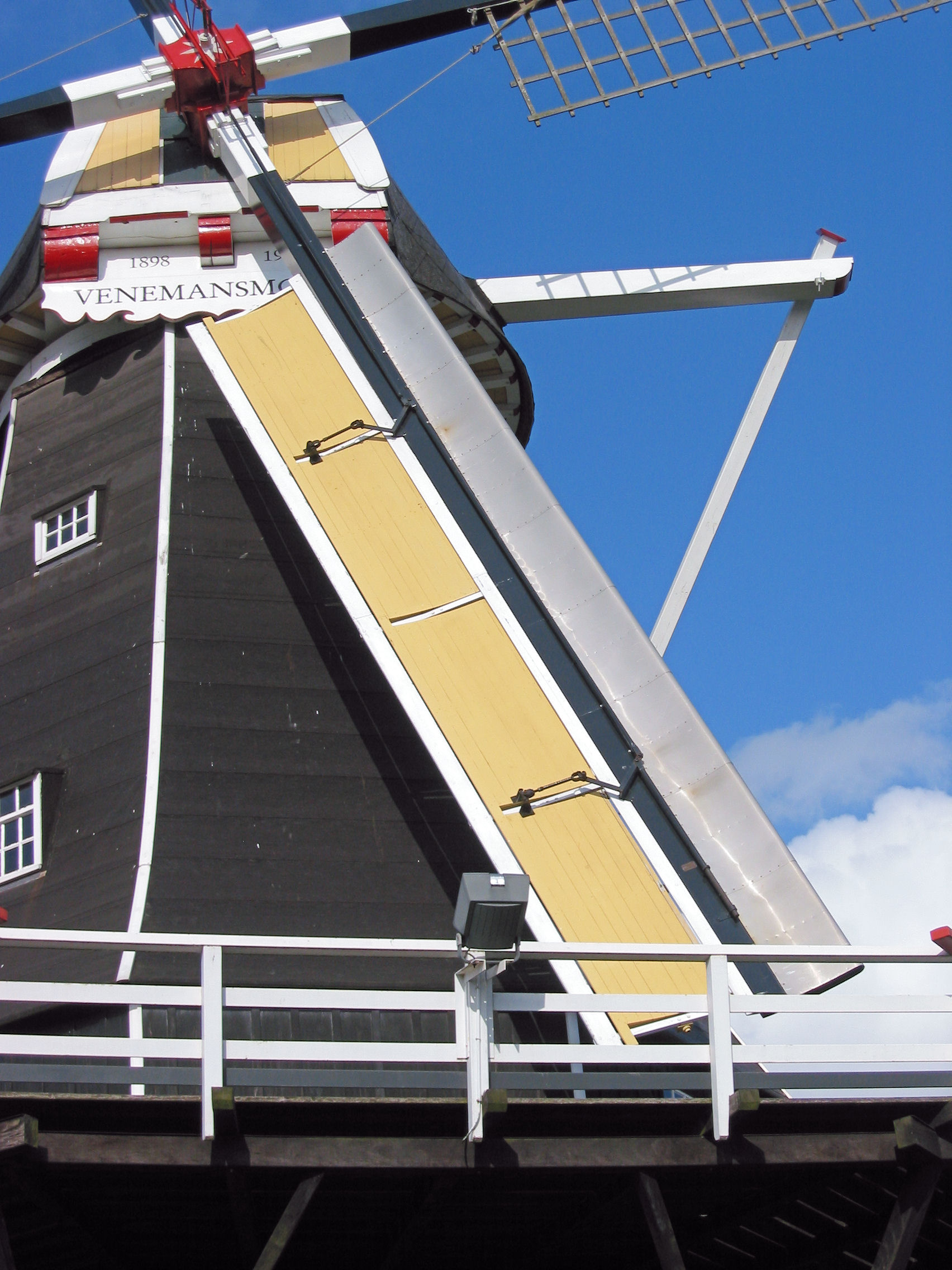
Ten Have sail closed with Van Bussel streamline leading edge.

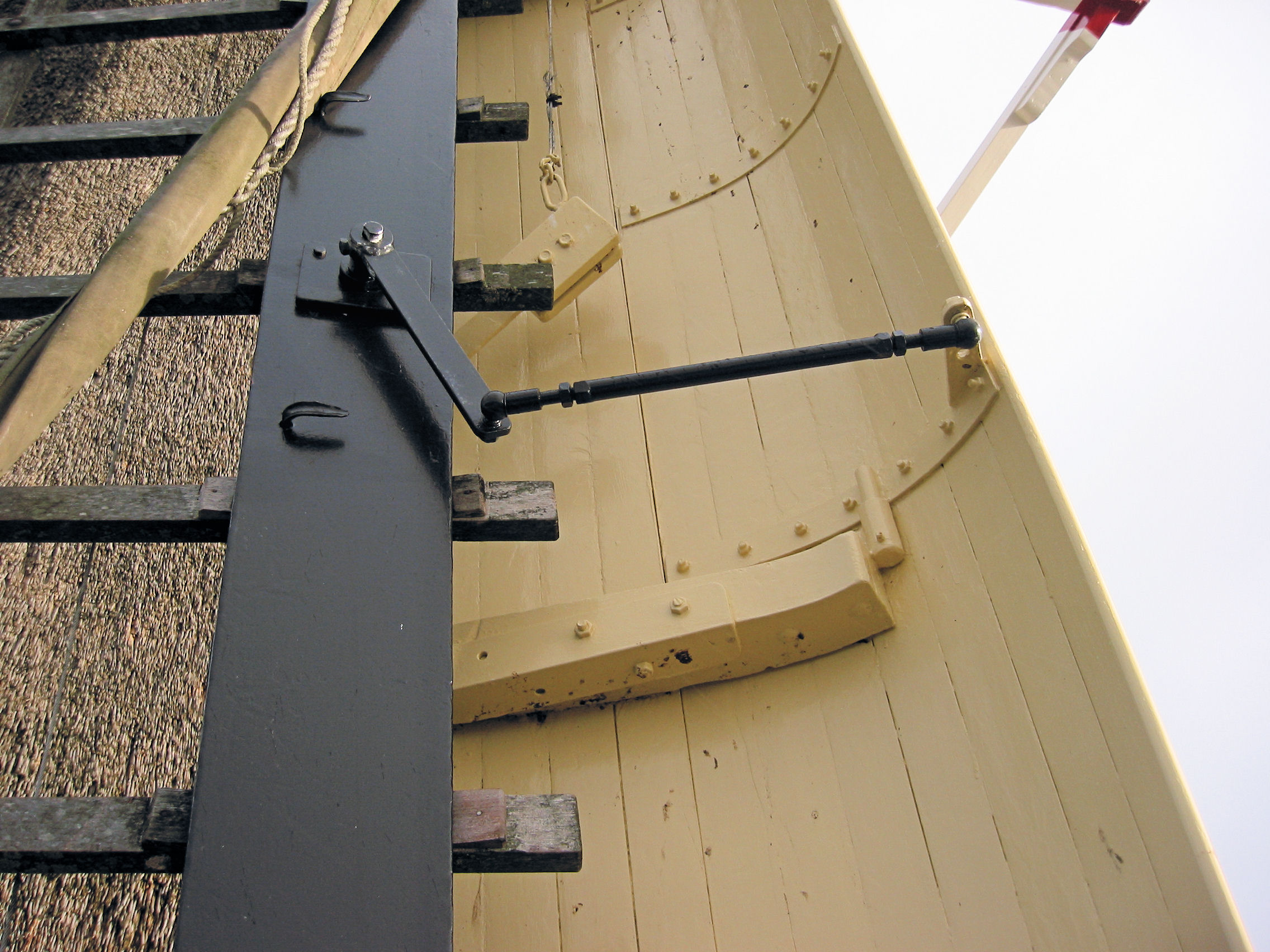
Close-up of Fok system with air brake

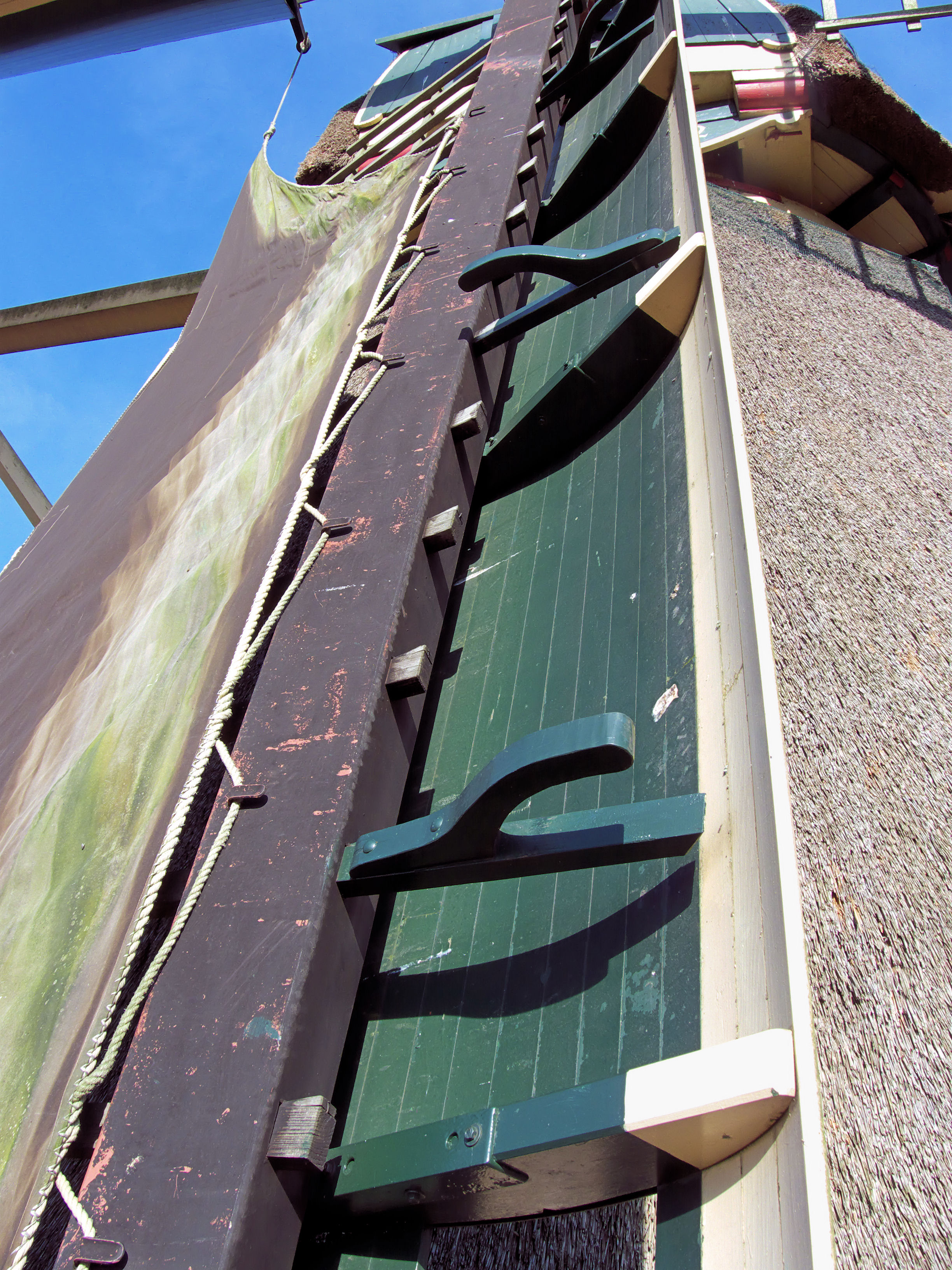
Close-up of Fok system with spread sailcloth

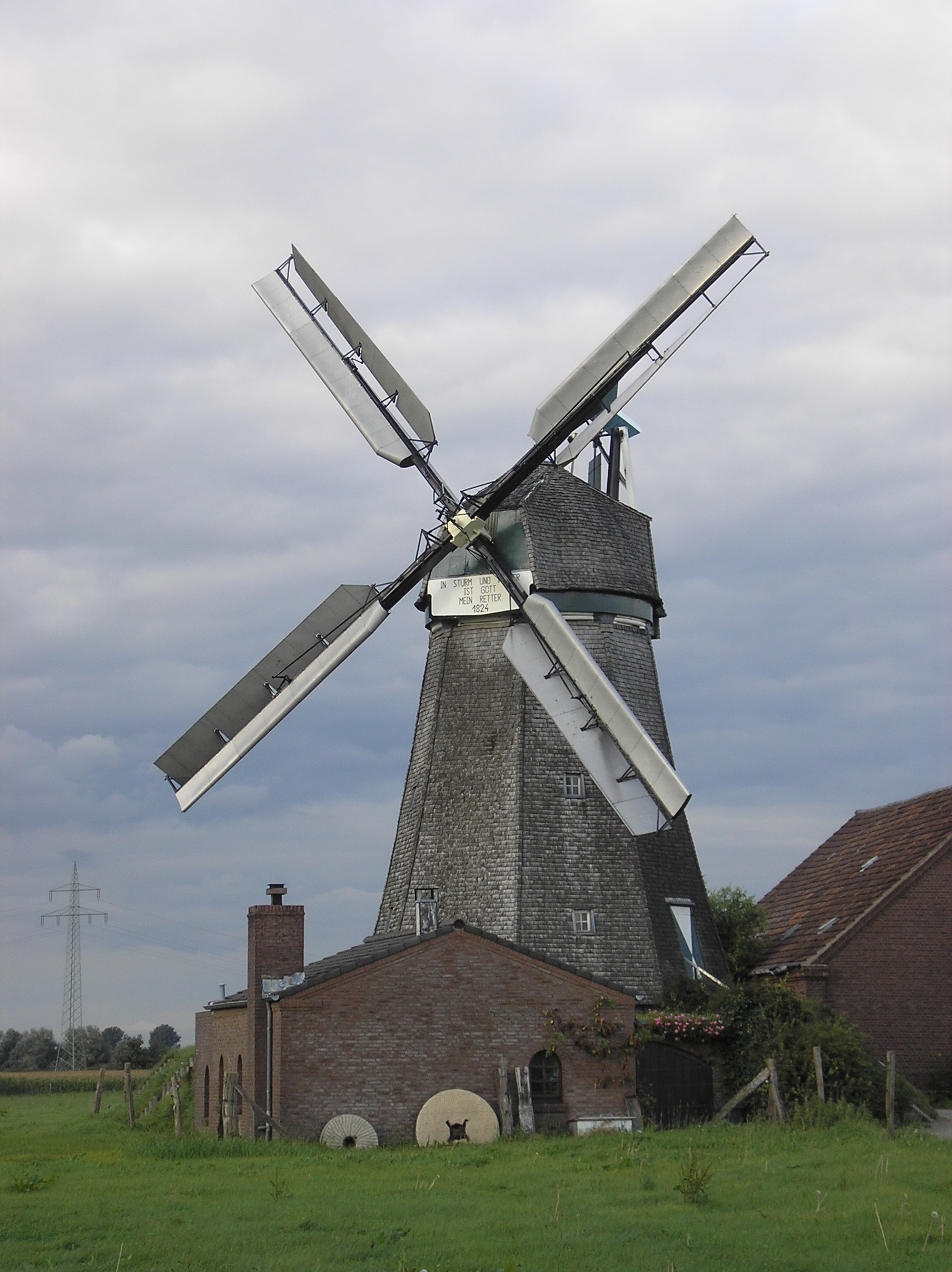
Mill equipped with Bilau sails

== Berton sails ==
In France some mills have a system of longitudinal shutters running the length of the sail. The system, invented in 1842, is called Ailes Berton, commemorating their inventor, Pierre-Théophile Berton . These sails can be adjusted without stopping the mill.

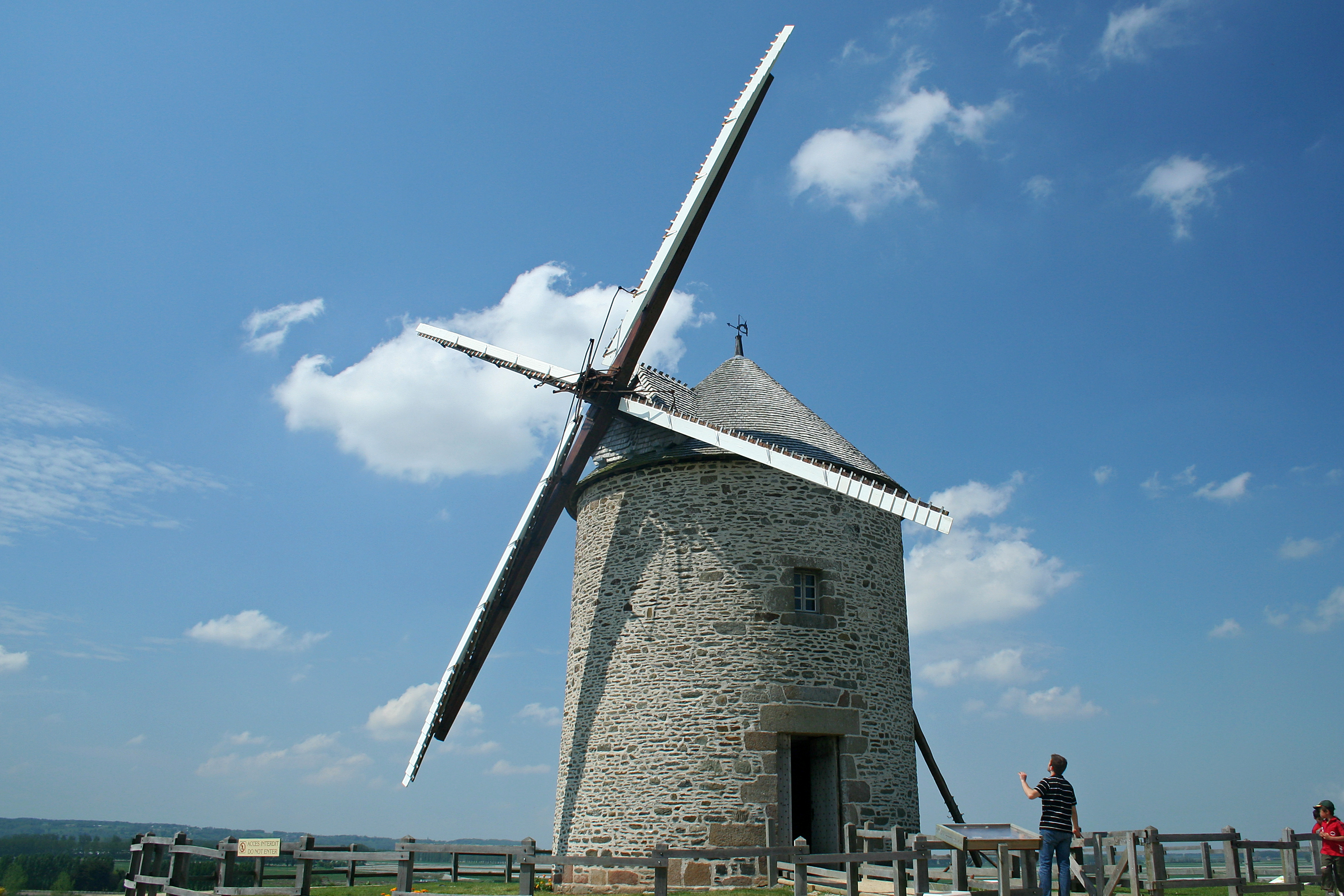
Berton sails closed

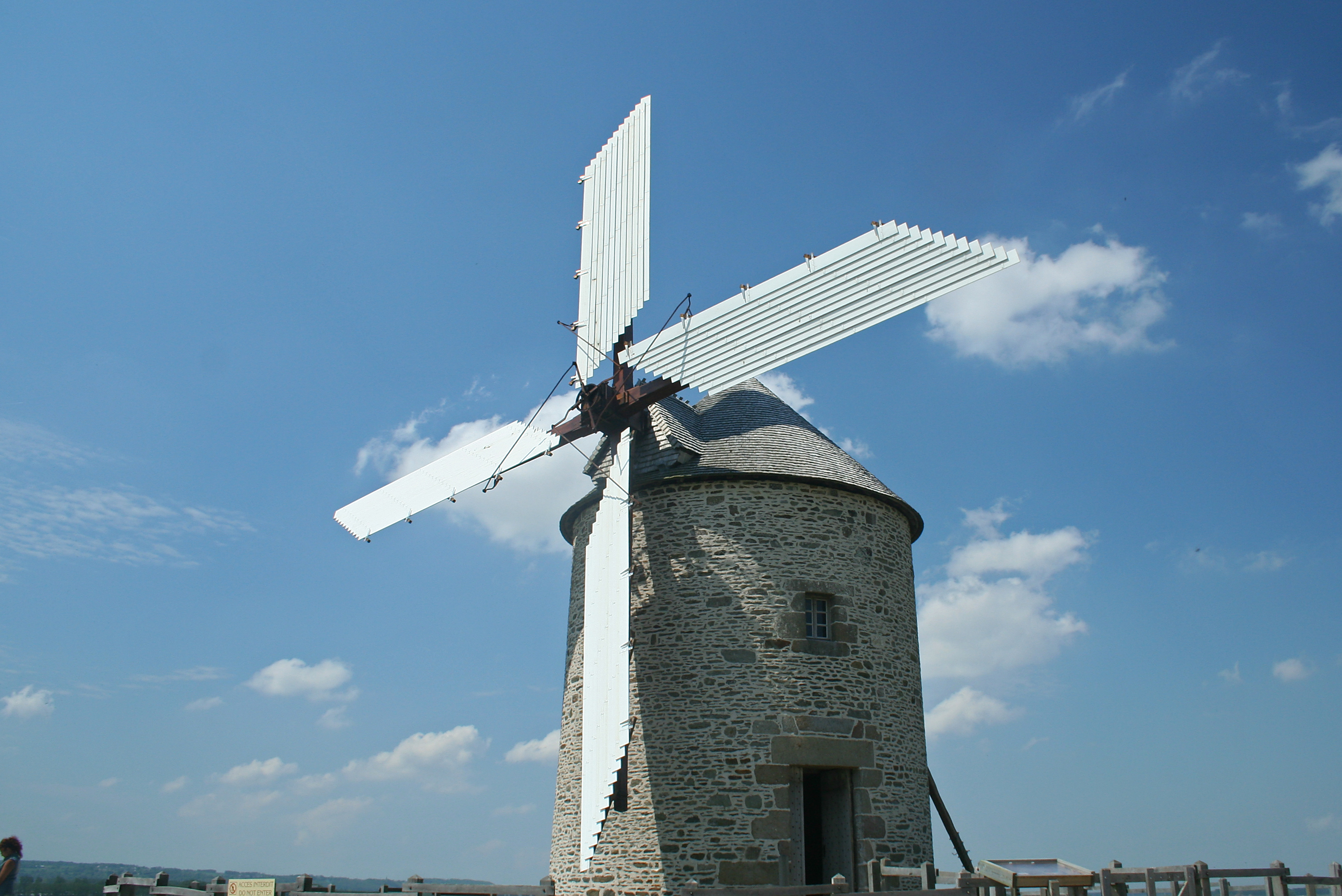
Berton sails open

== Annular sails ==
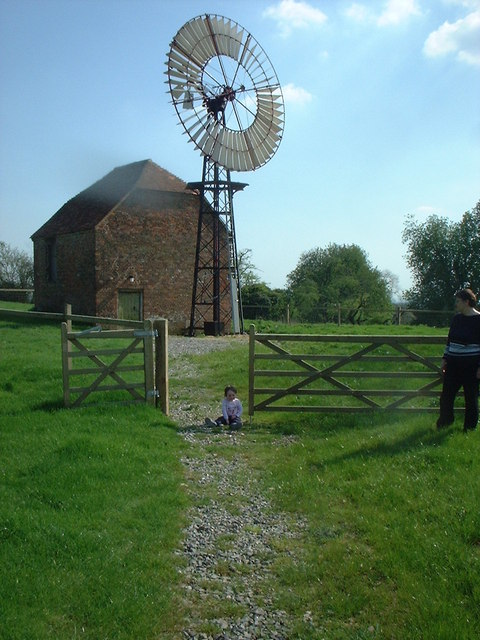
Crux Easton wind engine

A few mills had annular sails, forming a circle. These sails utilised the patent system, enabling adjustment to be made without stopping the mill. One example of a mill with annular sails was at Feltwell, Norfolk. Others are known to have existed at Haverhill, Suffolk, Boxford, Suffolk and Roxwell, Essex. Annular sails were also employed on large wind engines, such as the Titt engine at Crux Easton, Hampshire.

== Communication ==
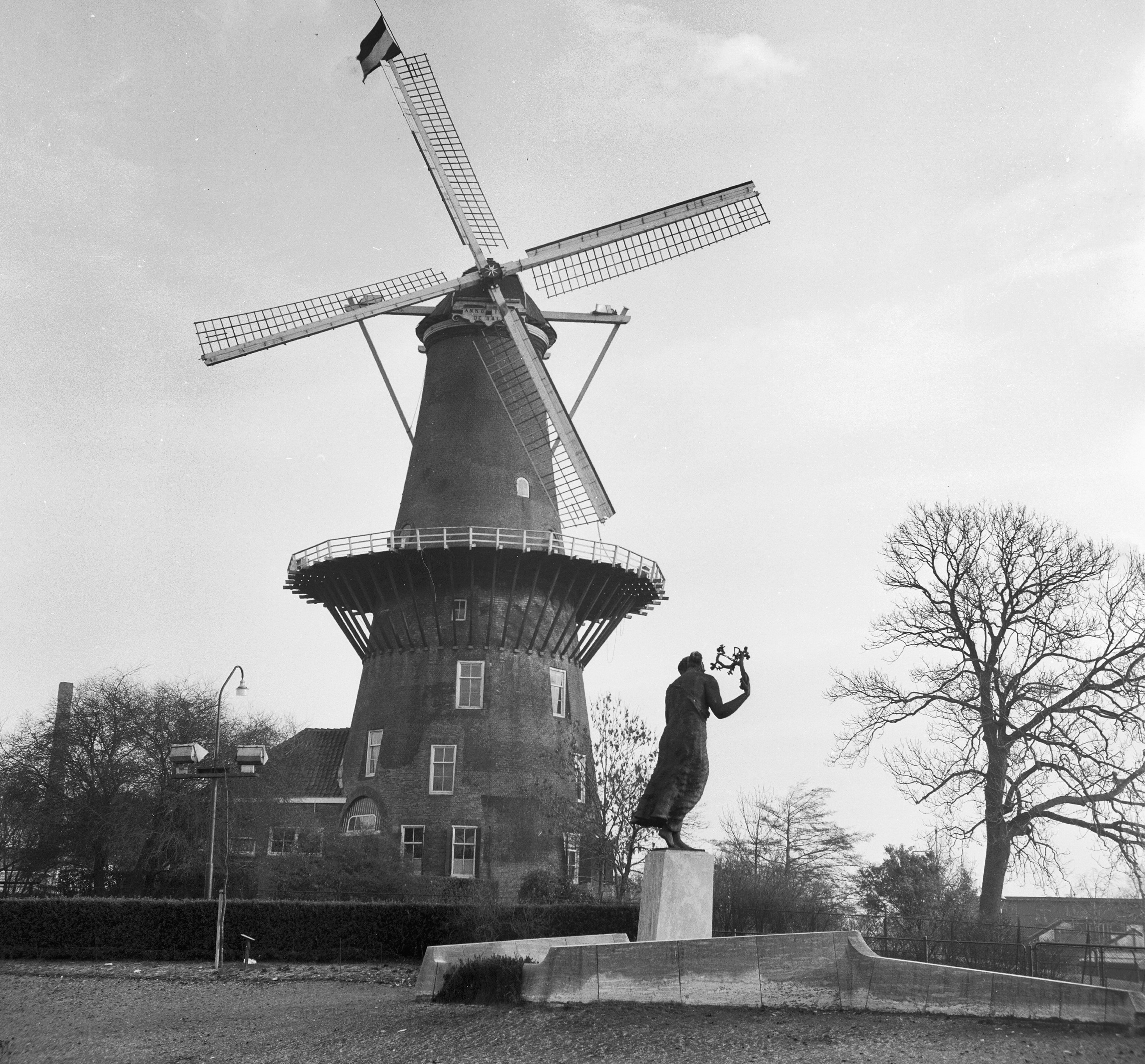
De Valk windmill in mourning position following the death of Queen Wilhelmina of the Netherlands in 1962

In the Netherlands the position of the sails can be used as a means of communication to display joy or mourning. These sail positions are generally used by the miller to show for example a birth, marriage or death within his family or circle of friends but may occasionally also be used to show mourning at national events, for example the death of Prince Friso and during the day of national mourning for victims of the Malaysia Airlines Flight 17.

== Notes ==
Sails are colloquially known as sweeps in Kent and Sussex, primarily due to the physical movement they perform and also that their construction does not necessarily involve sailcloth or canvas. Hence, patent sails are referred to as patent sweeps.
