= Millisle =

Village on the Ards Peninsula, Northern Ireland

Coordinates: 54.608°N 5.529°W

Millisle: Irish: Oileán an Mhuilinn
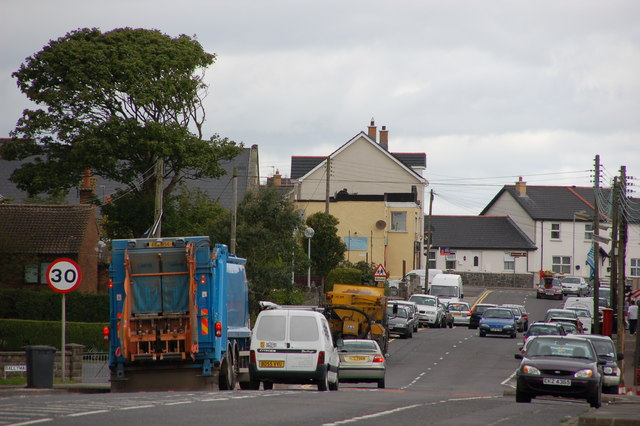
- Millisle Main Street, August 2006

- Location within County Down
- Population: 2,318 (2011 Census)
- District: Ards and North Down Borough
- County: County Down
- Country: Northern Ireland
- Sovereign state: United Kingdom
- Post town: NEWTOWNARDS
- Postcode district: BT22
- Dialling code: 028
- Police: Northern Ireland
- Fire: Northern Ireland
- Ambulance: Northern Ireland
- UK Parliament: North Down

Millisle or Mill Isle (from Scots mill + isle, meaning "the meadow of the mill") is a village on the Ards Peninsula in County Down, Northern Ireland. It is about 2.4 miles (3.9 km) south of Donaghadee town centre. It is situated in the townlands of Ballymacruise (from Irish Baile Mhic Naosa 'MacNeice’s townland') and Ballycopeland (from Irish Baile Chóplainn 'Copeland's townland'), the civil parish of Donaghadee and the historic barony of Ards Lower. It had a population of 2,318 people in the 2011 census.

== Etymology ==
The name Millisle is possibly derived from Irish Baile an Mhuilin 'Townland of the mill' which was referenced in the seventeenth century. Alternatively it may have been borrowed by the Scottish settlers to the area from the hamlet of Millisle in Wigtownshire.

== Population ==
In the 2011 Census Millisle had a population of 2,318 people (991 households). Millisle is classified as a village by the NI Statistics and Research Agency (NISRA) (i.e. with population between 1,000 and 2,250). On Census day (29 April 2001) there were 1,800 people living in Millisle. Of these:

- 19.0% were aged under 16 years and 25.5% were aged 60 and over
- 47.7% of the population were male and 52.3% were female
- 2.9% were from a Catholic background and 93.4% were from a Protestant background
- 6.1% of people aged 16–74 were unemployed.

== History ==
Some of the Jewish children who arrived in the UK in 1939 under the Kindertransport program were sent to Northern Ireland. Many of them were looked after by foster parents but others went to the Millisle Refugee Farm ("Magill's Farm", on the Woburn Road) which took refugees from May 1938 until its closure in 1948.

In 1944, construction of Millisle Airfield began but was halted after the ground was found to be unstable. The airfield was intended for the USAAF. Only two concrete runways remain today.

== Places of interest ==
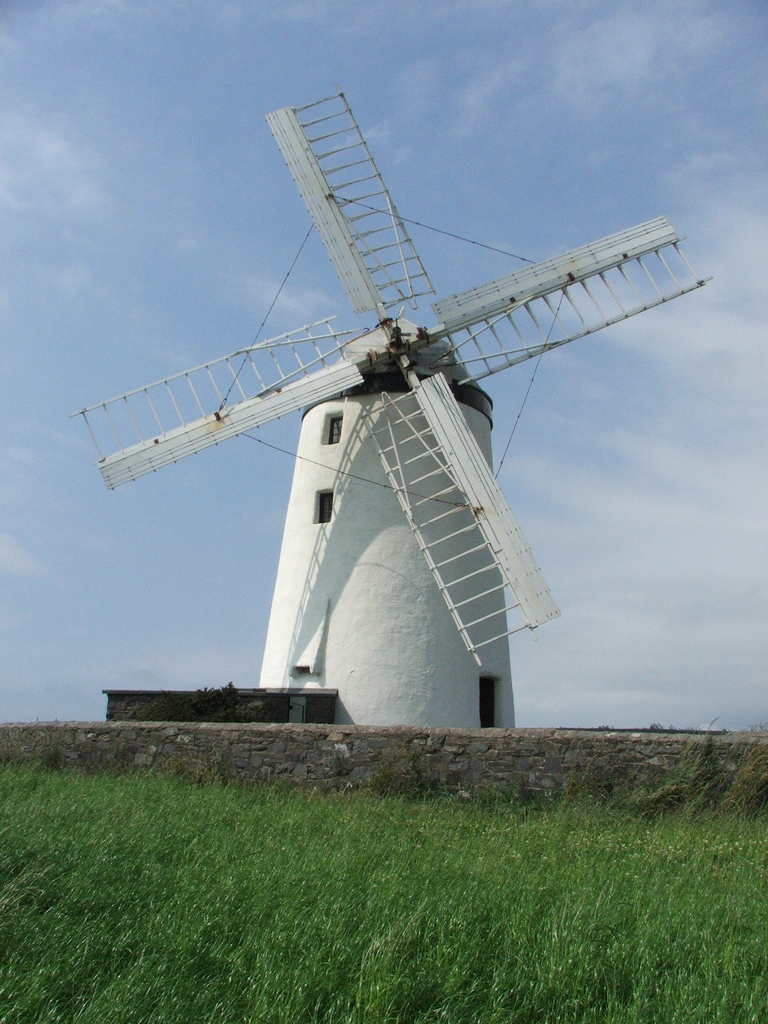
Ballycopeland windmill whence the town of Millisle derives its name

- Ballycopeland Windmill, a late 18th-century tower mill in use until 1915 and still in working order. The visitor centre at the miller's house includes an electrically operated model of the mill and a restored corn-drying kiln.
- Millisle Lagoon and Beach Park has 165 yd (150 m) of beachfront and received one of eight Northern Ireland Tourist Board 'Seaside Award' in 2010 for its natural beauty and cleanliness
- The Northern Ireland Prison Service College is situated on a 21-acre (85,000 m^{2}) site on the outskirts of Millisle.
- The First and Last Pub which is situated in Millisle was apparently visited in 1690 by William III of England on his way south to the Battle of the Boyne, despite actually being founded in 1790 a full hundred years after the battle.
- The Borstal, a former family summer home turned young offender's home, is now Lisnevin Training School, a prison officer training centre. This was closed and sold for 1.75 million in 2018
- Lisnevin School was an Industrial School, sometimes called Millisle Borstal after it moved to its location in 1931. it closed as a detention center on 7 October 2003.

== Sport ==
Abbey Villa F.C. play association football in the Northern Amateur Football League.

== People ==
- Amy Carmichael, a Christian missionary to India, was born in the village in 1867. The Carmichael townhouse, which was sited on the junction of Main Street and Abbey Road, was demolished in 2002. A commemorative plaque was erected by the town to mark the site.
- William Kelly (1821–1906), prominent member of the Plymouth Brethren, writer and scholar, was born in Millisle.

== See also ==
- List of towns and villages in Northern Ireland
- History of the Jews in Northern Ireland
