= RAF Millisle =

Former Royal Air Force station in Northern Ireland

RAF Millisle
- Killaughey Airfield
- Millisle, County Down in Northern Ireland
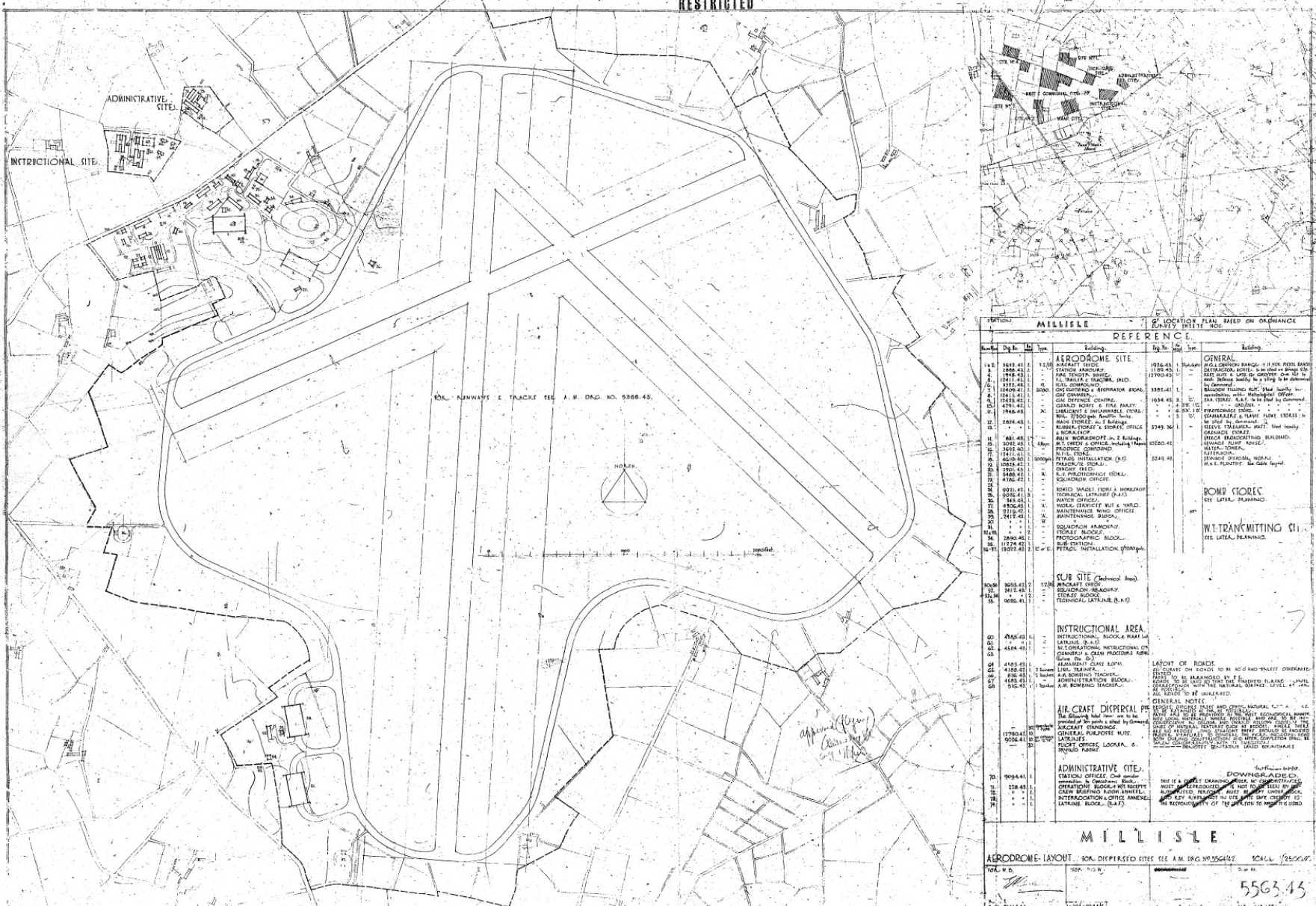
- Plan of the RAF Millisle

Site information
- Type: Royal Air Force satellite station
- Owner: Air Ministry
- Operator: Royal Air Force

Location
- Shown within Northern Ireland RAF Millisle (the United Kingdom)
- Coordinates: 54°36′50″N 5°35′00″W

Site history
- Built: 1942
- In use: 1942 - 1944

Airfield information
Runways
Direction	Length and surface
01/19	Concrete

Royal Air Force Millisle or more commonly RAF Millisle (also known as Killaughey Airfield) is a former Royal Air Force station located in Millisle, County Down, Northern Ireland. Unlike many wartime airfields which were cancelled during planning stages, RAF Millisle was abandoned in late stages of construction.

== History ==
During the Second World War in 1942, the Air Ministry begun the construction of a Royal Air Force station near Millisle. It was intended to be used by the United States Army Air Forces (USAAF) and also as a Combat Crew Replacement Center (CCRC). The airfield may have been intended for Boeing B-17 Flying Fortress bombers. Construction materials were brought by around 50 trucks and tractors, and the Air Ministry ordered construction work every Sunday. Local houses and farms were blown up to make way for the airfield.

Shortly after the construction begun, runways on the north side began to experience undulations. This was caused by the location of the airfield, which was built on a boggy grassland; creating unstable ground. By 1943, a perimeter track and runway 01/19 was laid, with costs amounting up to £58,000. Construction was halted by 1943, and the airfield was also built during the end of the Second World War, making it an unnecessary project. In late 1944, a second house was blown up to make way for the construction. However, the construction of the airfield was abandoned in 1944 after facing enough issues.

=== Abandonment ===
After the abandonment of the construction, the already-completed buildings were used by local farmers. The Women's Auxiliary Air Force (WAAF) accommodation and post office was demolished after the war. The remaining runways were used for emergency landings and touch-and-go training exercises by de Havilland Tiger Moths of Army Air Corps until the 1970s. It utilised a part of the runway, which remained in use up until the late 1980s.
