= Ballycopeland Windmill =

Windmill in Northern Ireland

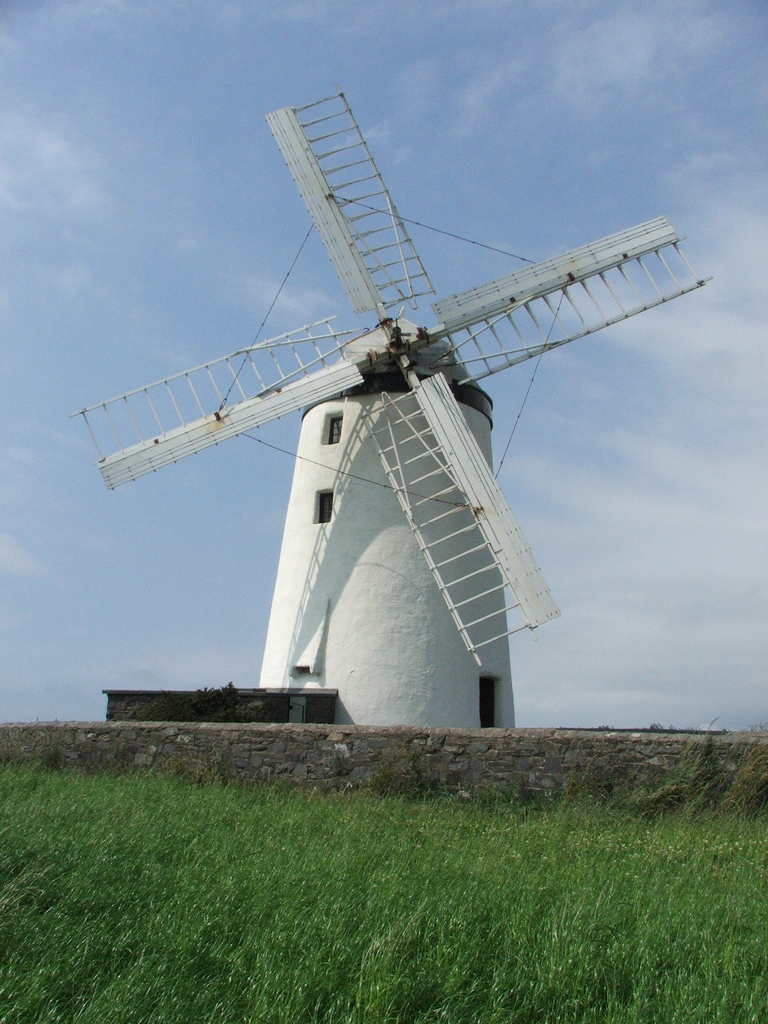
- Ballycopeland Windmill

Origin
- Mill location: Millisle, County Down
- Coordinates: 54°36′29″N 5°33′24″W
- Operator(s): Department for Communities

Information
- Purpose: Corn mill
- Type: Tower mill
- Storeys: Four storeys
- No. of sails: Four
- Type of sails: Roller reefing sails
- Winding: Fantail
- Fantail blades: Eight

Ballycopeland Windmill is a functioning windmill located one mile west of Millisle, County Down, Northern Ireland. It is managed by the Historic Environment Division of the Department for Communities and is open to the public. It is known in Irish as Muileann gaoithe Bhaile Chóplainn and in Ulster-Scots as Ballycopelann Wun-mäll. The windmill is just one part of the fully restored heritage attraction which opened in May 2022.

== Features ==
The visitor centre at the miller's house features an electrically operated model of the mill and hands-on experience of milling. There is also a restored corn-drying kiln.

== History ==
The plastered and white-washed tapering tower is a landmark in that area and the last remaining windmill of more than hundred mills in County Down. It was owned by the McGilton family and the mill ground grain until 1915. In 1935 it was acquired by the government of Northern Ireland. Disused for many decades, in 1978, the old windmill was restored to working order again.
