= Chantrey =

Chantrey may refer to:

- Francis Leggatt Chantrey (1781–1841), English sculptor
- Julia Chantrey (born 1980), Canadian actress
- Chantrey Inlet, a bay on the Arctic coast of Canada

== See also ==
- Chantry (disambiguation)
