= Chandlers Green =

Hamlet in Hampshire, England

Coordinates: 51.313705°N 0.94876707°W

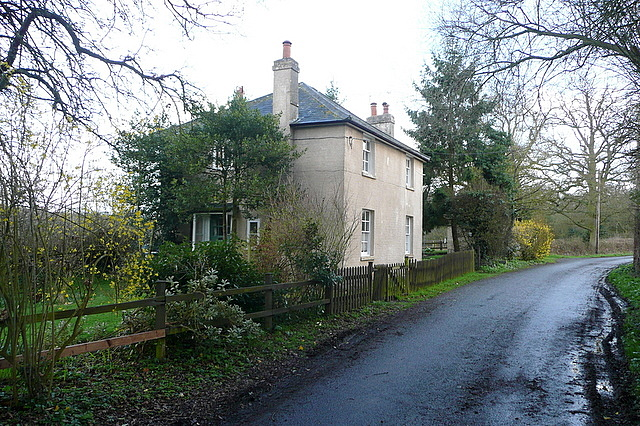
- House at Chandlers Green

- Location within Hampshire
- OS grid reference: SU7336457701
- District: Hart
- Shire county: Hampshire
- Region: South East
- Country: England
- Sovereign state: United Kingdom
- Post town: Hook
- Postcode district: RG27
- Police: Hampshire and Isle of Wight
- Fire: Hampshire and Isle of Wight
- Ambulance: South Central
- UK Parliament: North East Hampshire

Chandlers Green is a hamlet in the civil parish of Hartley Wespall in the Hart District of Hampshire, England. Its nearest town is Hook approximately 2.5 miles (4.0 km) away.
