= Chalk End =

Hamlet in Essex, England

Coordinates: 51.7694°N 0.3614°E

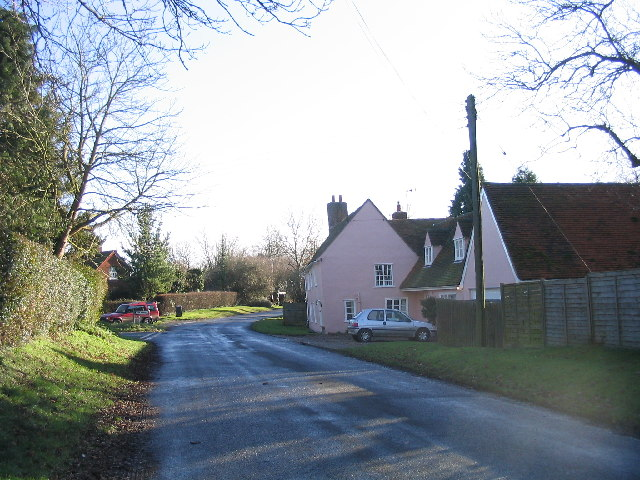
- Chalk End

- Location within Essex
- OS grid reference: TL629105
- Civil parish: Roxwell
- District: Chelmsford
- Shire county: Essex
- Region: East
- Country: England
- Sovereign state: United Kingdom
- Police: Essex
- Fire: Essex
- Ambulance: East of England

Chalk End is a hamlet in the civil parish of Roxwell and the Chelmsford district of Essex, England. The hamlet is 1.5 miles (2.4 km) northwest from the parish village of Roxwell, and lies on the A1060 Bishop's Stortford to Chelmsford road.
