= Chalkfoot =

Hamlet in Cumbria, England

Coordinates: 54.827°N 3.030°W

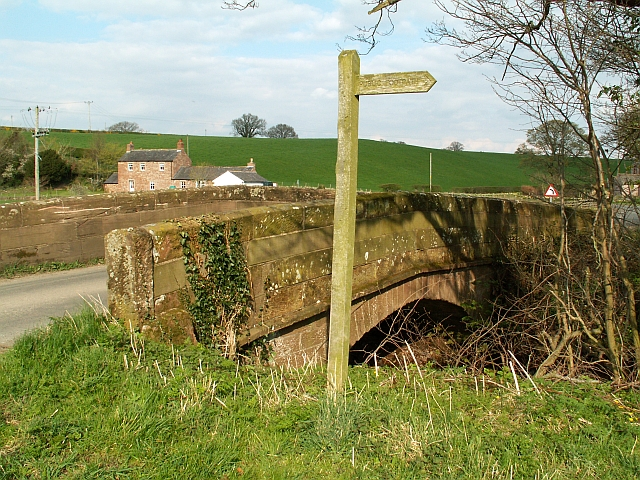
- Chalkfoot Bridge

- Location in the former Carlisle district, Cumbria Location within Cumbria
- OS grid reference: NY338485
- Civil parish: Dalston
- Unitary authority: Cumberland
- Ceremonial county: Cumbria
- Region: North West
- Country: England
- Sovereign state: United Kingdom
- Post town: CARLISLE
- Postcode district: CA5
- Dialling code: 01228
- Police: Cumbria
- Fire: Cumbria
- Ambulance: North West
- UK Parliament: Carlisle

Chalkfoot is a hamlet in Cumbria, England.
