= Roxwell =

Village in Essex, England

Coordinates: 51.746660805871°N 0.4065843830724°E

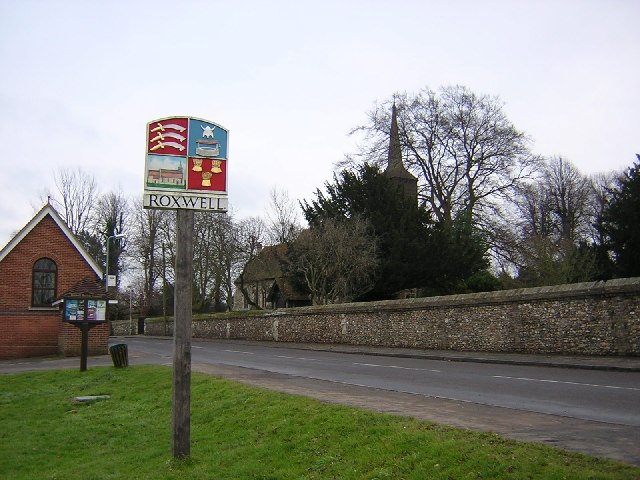
- Village sign and church

- Location within Essex
- Population: 1,107 (Parish, 2021)
- Civil parish: Roxwell
- District: Chelmsford
- Shire county: Essex
- Region: East
- Country: England
- Sovereign state: United Kingdom
- Post town: Chelmsford
- Postcode district: CM1
- Police: Essex
- Fire: Essex
- Ambulance: East of England

Roxwell is a village and civil parish in the Chelmsford district of Essex, England. The village is approximately 4 miles (6 km) west from the centre of the county town of Chelmsford, and to the south of the A1060 road, on which are the parish hamlets of Boyton Cross and Chalk End. Further Roxwell hamlets are Peppers Green at the north of the parish and Radley Green at the south. At the 2021 census the parish had a population of 1,107.

== The village ==
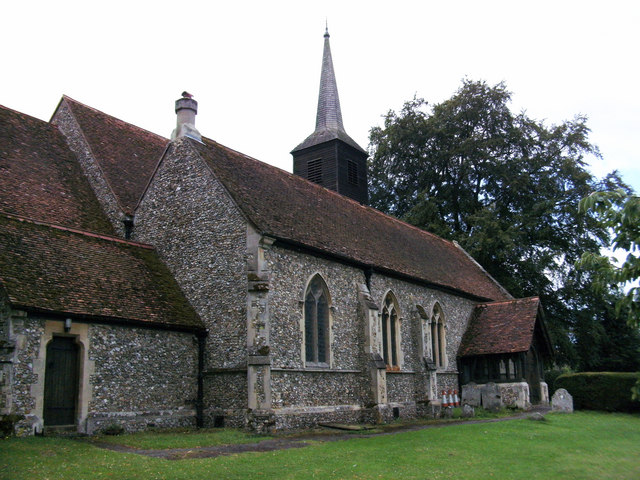
St Michael and All Angels' church

The Anglican parish church of St Michael and All Angels dates from the 14th century and is a Grade II* listed building. There is a primary school called Roxwell Church of England Voluntary Controlled Primary School which is linked to the local Anglican parish church, the Chequers public house, and a village store and post office.

Newland Hall, an Elizabethan manor house on Bishops Stortford Road, was built by the Newland family, descendants of the 13th century lord of the manor Ralph de Neweland. At the time of the Domesday Book, the land was owned by Eustace, Earl of Boulogne. The Hall is now used as a wedding venue.

== History ==
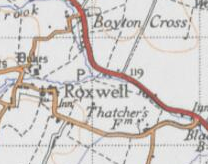
Ordnance Survey of Great Britain

In 1870–72, Roxwell was described as:

"a parish, with a village, in Chelmsford district, Essex; on the river Chelmer, 4½ miles W by N of Chelmsford r. station."

In 1894, the village had a parish council consisting of 7 members and a chairman. Also, at this time the village had a manor house called Dukes Manor which belonged to Lord Petre.

== Demographics ==
=== Population ===
In 2021, the population of the parish was 1,107. At the previous 2011 census, Roxwell had a population of 1,044.

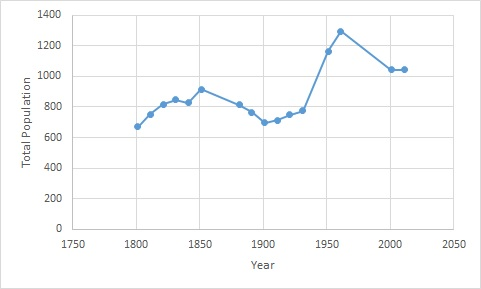
Population growth in Roxwell from 1801 to 2011 reported using census data

=== Occupations and health ===
Information from occupational structure graphs shows a clear change in type of employment since the late 19th century. In 1881 agriculture was the dominant occupation whereas in 2011 many more residents worked in professional occupations. There is a clear change in the occupational structure for men who have shifted from Agricultural occupations to occupations involved in Construction. Nowadays, few women work in the Domestic Offices or Services, whilst the majority of women work in Social Services such as in Human Health or Education. This changing pattern of occupation fits in with the overall national trends, where 12% of those in England and Wales work in Skilled Trades Occupations.

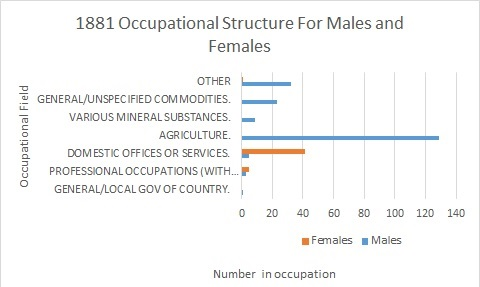
1881 occupational structure of Roxwell
