= Cess, Norfolk =

Hamlet in Norfolk, England

Coordinates: 52.704°N 1.617°E

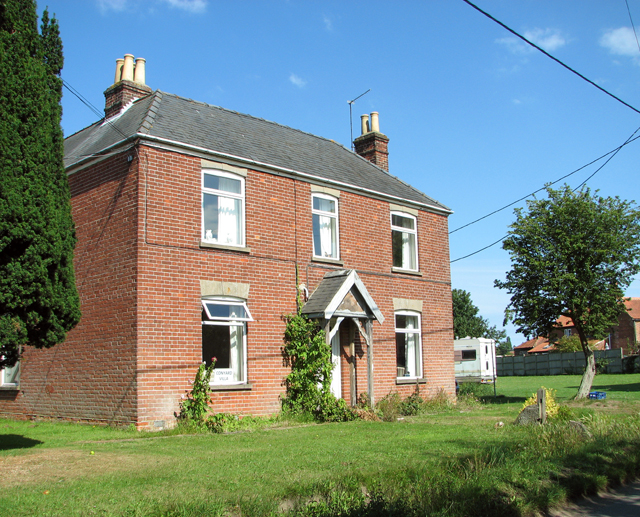
House in Cess

Cess is a hamlet on the River Thurne in the southwestern part of the village of Martham, in Norfolk, England, within The Broads a member of the National Parks. The population of the hamlet falls within the civil parish of Martham.
