= Chalkhouse Green =

Village in Oxfordshire, England

Coordinates: 51°29′49″N 0°58′49″W

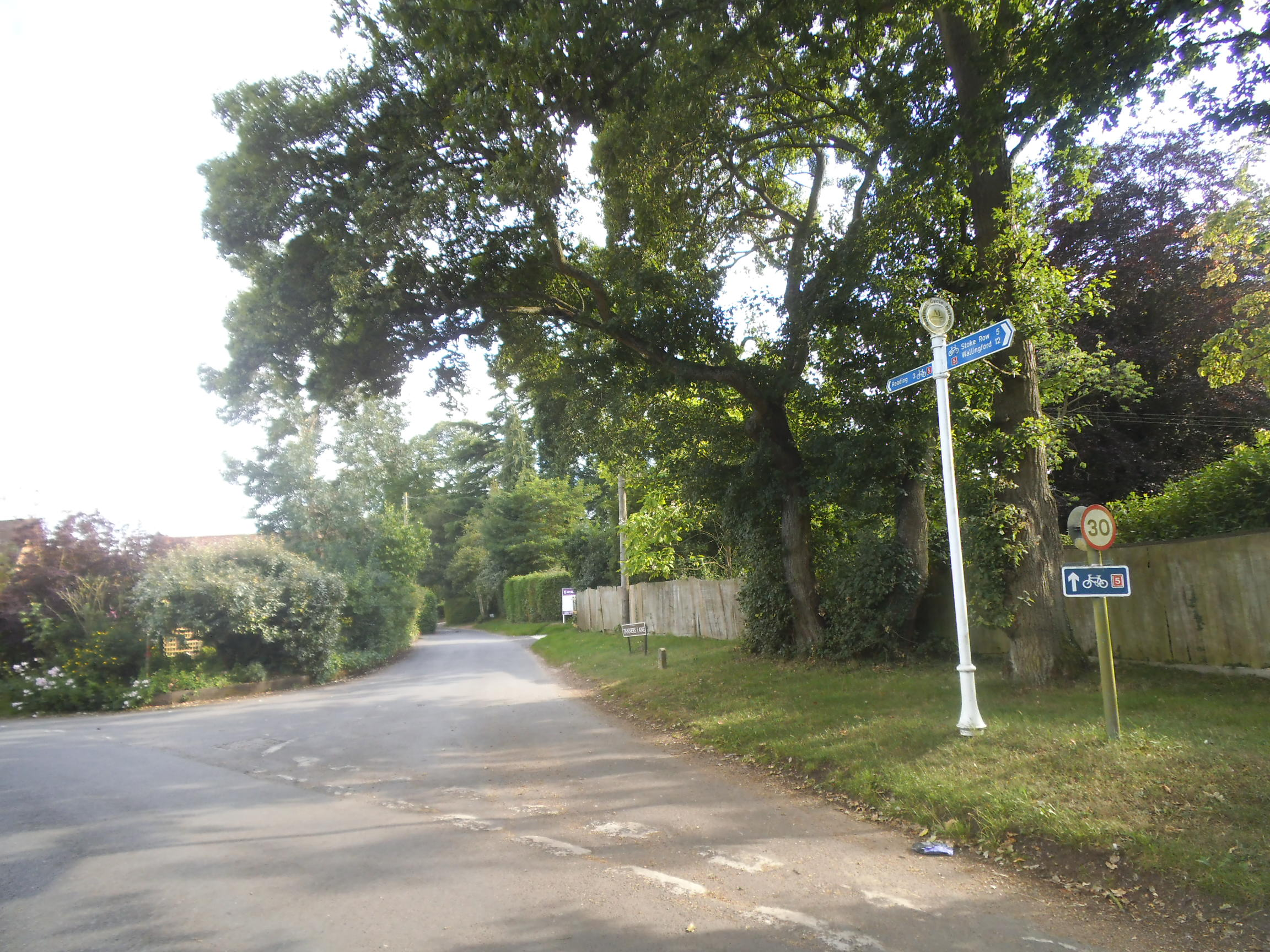
- Tanners Lane near Chalkhouse Green

- Location within Oxfordshire Chalkhouse Green (Oxfordshire)
- Area: 0.21 km^{2} (0.081 sq mi)
- Population: 215 (2011 Census)
  - Density: 1,024/km^{2} (2,650/sq mi)
- OS grid reference: SU 7091 7807
- Civil parish: Kidmore End
- District: South Oxfordshire
- Shire county: Oxfordshire
- Region: South East
- Country: England
- Sovereign state: United Kingdom
- Post town: Reading
- Postcode district: RG4
- Dialling code: 0118
- Police: Thames Valley
- Fire: Oxfordshire
- Ambulance: South Central
- UK Parliament: Henley

Chalkhouse Green is a village in Oxfordshire, England. The village is approximately 3 miles (4.8 km) north of Reading, at an average elevation of 83 metres above the sea level. The 2011 Census recorded the population of the area as 215.
