= Chantry Island =

Chantry Island may refer to:

- Chantry Island, Hertfordshire, a small piece of land in Hertfordshire, United Kingdom

Canada

- Chantry Island (Ontario), a small island in Lake Huron
  - Chantry Island Lightstation Tower, a small island on Lake Huron containing the Chantry Island Lighthouse and Bird Sanctuary.
- Chantry Island (Nunavut), a small island in Dolphin and Union Strait at Bernard Harbour
