= Chapel End, Walthamstow =

Coordinates: 51.598825°N 0.015736°W

Chapel End
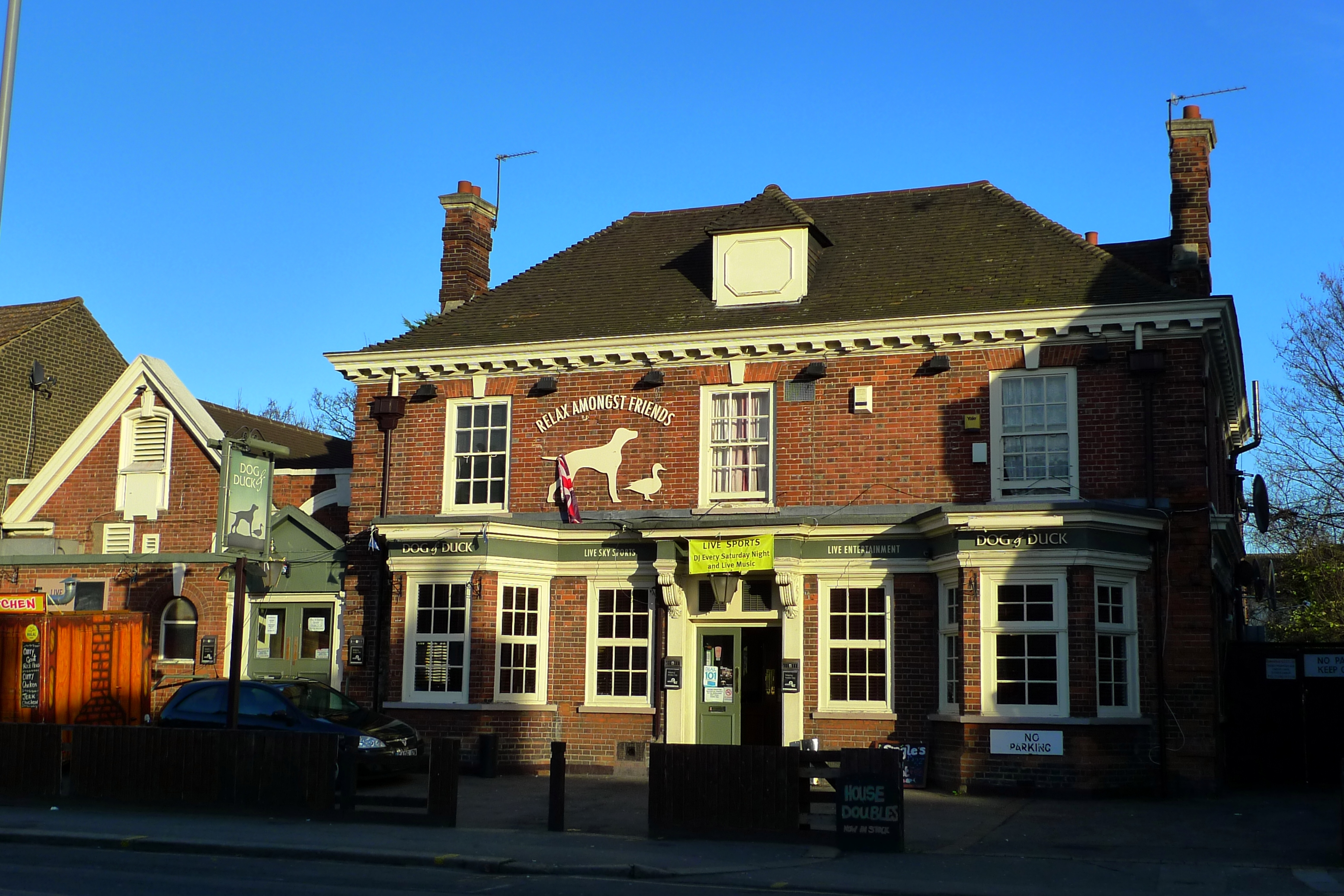
- Dog and Duck, Chapel End, Walthamstow

- Location within Greater London
- Population: 13,614 (2021 census)
- London borough: Waltham Forest
- Ceremonial county: Greater London
- Region: London
- Country: England
- Sovereign state: United Kingdom
- Post town: WOODFORD GREEN
- Postcode district: IG8
- Dialling code: 020
- Police: Metropolitan
- Fire: London
- Ambulance: London
- UK Parliament: Walthamstow
- London Assembly: North East

Chapel End is a suburb in East London in the London Borough of Waltham Forest, south of Woodford Green, east of Tottenham and north of Walthamstow.

== History ==
The name Chapel End refers to a historic chapel.

== Education ==
- Chapel End Infants' School
- Chapel End Junior Academy
- Chapel End School

== Religion ==
- St Mary's Church

== Governance ==
Chapel End is part of the Walthamstow constituency for elections to the House of Commons of the United Kingdom.

Chapel End is part of the Chapel End ward for elections to Waltham Forest London Borough Council.
