= Redzz =

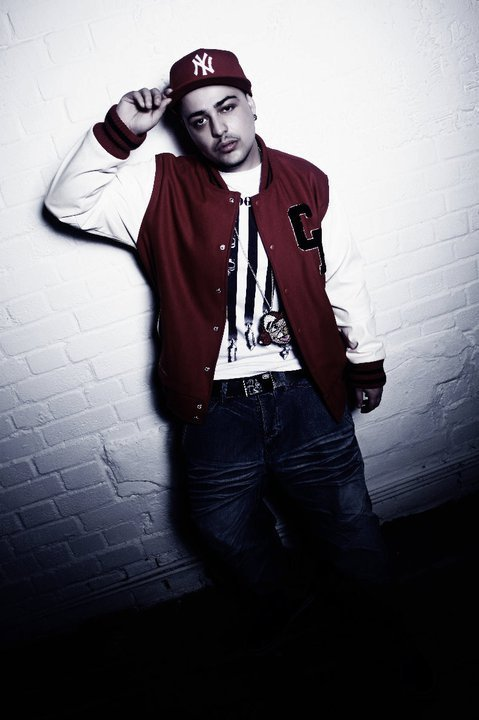

Background information
- Also known as: Redzz, The Infamous, RedMusicUk
- Born: Shakeel Warner; 1987 (age 38–39); Leytonstone, London, England
- Genres: Hip-hop, grime, dubstep
- Instrument: Vocals
- Years active: 2005–present
- Label: RedMusicUk
- Website: youtube.com/redmusicukofficial

Shakeel Warner (born 1987), better known as Redzz, is an English rapper, record producer, singer, songwriter, actor & DJ. He first gained recognition through a series of independent single releases such as Magic Magic featuring (LZ7) singer Soul Nana, Bad Enough featuring West Coast Hip Hop artists Shade Sheist, TQ & Young Noble of The Outlawz, Kyla, Hot Sauce, Puppet Master featuring Sway, Tables Turn featuring Leddra Chapman & Through The Eyes which went number 1 on an unknown chart. All of his singles gained national TV & radio support on stations such as BBC introducing and freebies on games consoles

== Early life ==
Redzz was born and raised, primarily, in the infamous Redwood Tower block (now demolished) situated in the heart of Cathall Estate, a rough, crime ridden council estate of Leytonstone, East London and is of a mixed heritage background. Whilst attending high school he began to rap, initially writing lyrics into his school books and recording rhymes into a Dictaphone. His favourite classes in school were Music, English Literature & Drama.

== Music career ==
=== As a DJ ===
Redzz began to obtain a loyal following as a street emcee battler and DJ on the pirate radio station Klimax FM in 2008.

=== Solo work ===
==== Magic Magic ====
He released his debut single "Magic Magic" featuring Soul Nana independently in 2008, the music video gained support from Flava TV after receiving millions of hits in total across the internet, also helping Redzz official YouTube channel to go number 1 on YouTube's "Most Viewed Musician – Global" chart. Magic Magic was produced by Redzz.

==== Bad Enough ====
He released his second single Bad Enough featuring Shade Sheist, TQ & Young Noble of The Outlawz in 2009 which was produced by Redzz himself and was supported by Flava TV & BBC Radio. The music video was filmed in Los Angeles. The chorus on "Bad Enough" was a section taken from TQ's verse which was accidentally chopped up and used as a chorus, Redzz only found this out when he eventually met TQ in Los Angeles to film the music video.

==== Hot Sauce ====
In 2010, he released his third single "Hot Sauce" which was produced by Redzz himself. The single was supported by Flava TV, Kiss TV & Choice FM, but to name a few. "Hot Sauce" was voted in at number 1 on the "UK Raw Talent" chart by viewers and selected at number 1 on "Redzz Top 20 Mixtape" countdown on Flava TV. Redzz has since stated that "Hot Sauce" came about whilst messing around in a recording studio singing "I got the hot sauce", he has also stated the meaning behind the song on an online interview; "Hot Sauce means to have something worth hating on, if you have haters because you've got something good going on in your life then you have the Hot Sauce". The video to Hot Sauce was filmed in Houston, Texas.

==== History ====
He then went on to work with 50 Cent's own G-Unit Records & former G-Unit artistYoung Buck, recording a song entitled "History" which also featured UK Funky House singer Kyla. History was produced by Redzz himself. He has stated that the version leaked online isn't the official version.

=== Here Comes Trouble ===
He released his first official street album "Here Comes Trouble" in 2011 which featured a host of UK and US rappers including G-Unit Records and former G-Unit member Young Buck, Shade Sheist & Young Noble of 2Pac's The Outlawz but to name a few. Here Comes Trouble sold over 20,000 copies on the streets around the UK.

==== Puppet Master ====
In 2011 he released his fourth single "Puppet Master" featuring Sway (Konvict Music) & Ayo" which gained support on BBC Radio 1, Soccer AM, KISS TV, PlayStation, VidZone, Flava, Massive R&B, Channel AKA, VOX Africa & Brit Asia but to name a few. The music video to Puppet Master also entered in the 'Top 20 Massive R&B Chart' on Massive R&B and 'Top 20 Street Bangers Right Now' on Channel AKA. On 14 September 2011, Redzz was interviewed via telephone on BBC Radio 1, in the interview Redzz revealed the meaning behind Puppet Master saying "Puppet Master meaning, setting the trends". He also revealed that he is working with 90210 actress Jessica Lowndes. He is currently working on a new album to be called Recognition. On Wednesday, 2 November 2011 Redzz performed Puppet Master on BBC Radio 1 with Sway and they were also interviewed. On 29 October 2011, Puppet Master was used as the soundtrack on Sky Sports, Soccer AM show "Showboat" and featured on Sky Sports official website touting Redzz as a "YouTube sensation".

==== Tables Turn ====
On 5 March 2012, Redzz released his fifth single Tables Turn which featured Leddra Chapman. The music video to Tables Turn featured cameo appearances from DJ Ironik, Isaac Ssebandeke (who starred in Skins, Casualty & whom Redzz acted with previously in Dubplate Drama), comedian A Squeezy, Simon Paice & Sal Warner. Tables Turn stirred up an incredible buzz on its initial online release gaining over 170,000 views in one day on YouTube thus entering into the YouTube music charts & was promoted by the likes of Ed Sheeran & UK boxer Amir Khan on Twitter & Facebook. On 29 March 2012, Tables Turn was playlisted by Channel AKA entering straight into the "Hottest 20 Street Bangers Right Now" chart & was supported by BBC Radio. On 26 April 2012, Tables Turn was play listed by Sub TV to broadcast to over 86 universities in the UK. That same day, the song was selected by VidZone to be made available for all PlayStation console owners.

==== Through The Eyes ====
On 8 May 2012, Redzz released his sixth and most recent single titled Through The Eyes (formally known as I'm An Alcoholic) which caused a huge online stir on its initial release gaining over 116,000 views on YouTube and trending number 1 on Twitter as the most shared video ahead of Justin Bieber. On 14 May 2012, Redzz was interviewed by Chicago Monthly & Chelsea Monthly magazines where he talked about the story behind 'Through The Eyes' and his views on combating alcoholism which also prompted a supportive response from former Liberal Democrats MP Lembit Opik who said; "I think it is very important what Redzz is doing with the 'Through The Eyes' song, especially when it concerns young people. The more education they get the better informed they are". On 16 May 2012, Through The Eyes went number 1 on The Official International Independent Charts. The song is based on a true story about an old friend of Redzz named Del, who was an alcoholic. In the song Redzz raps in First-person narrative as if he is Del the alcoholic, portraying the downward spiral in Del's life, dealing with the effects of alcoholism and also explaining why Del became an alcoholic to help the listeners sympathize with the character. The music video to Through The Eyes was the first music video to be co-directed by Redzz himself, it was also co-directed by Sal Warner & Elmino Da Great. In the music video Redzz is depicted as either (left open for the viewers to debate) a guardian angel or a Grim Reaper who is seen by the viewer but not by Del (Simon Paice). This is made clear at the end of the music video when a newspaper with the title "Rapper Redzz Dies Of Alcoholism" is read by a man in a pub. He then unknowingly, walks past Redzz who then proceeds to follow him, indicating the man is to be the next victim. The music video features cameo roles from; Simon Paice, Ian Duck (from the films Derailed, Run Fat Boy Run & Wimbledon) & Sal Warner. Scenes in the music video were primarily filmed in and around Redzz home towns Leyton & Leytonstone in East London such as The Coach And Horses pub, Leyton Supermarket & Thatched House. On 18 May 2012, Redzz teamed up with National Association for Children of Alcoholics also known as NACOA to help raise awareness on the effects of alcoholism, particularly children with alcohol dependent parents and is planning on donating some of the proceeds for his single towards the charity. On 3 June 2012, Redzz performed 'Through The Eyes' at the annual Upfest, a charitable festival in association with NACOA. Redzz changed the name of 'I'm An Alcoholic' to 'Through The Eyes' as he was having difficulties in radio support as the name 'I'm An Alcoholic' was to hard hitting. In a tweet on Twitter Redzz stated "It's sad how a song about getting drunk out of your face is acceptable, but a song about the negative effects of alcohol is seen as a taboo."

=== Other work ===
Redzz acted as himself in the Channel 4 and MTV Base television series "Dubplate Drama" appearing in the final ever instalment of the programme portraying a gang member. Redzz has been featured in national magazines and publications such as RWD Magazine. He has appeared on a TV show dedicated to himself on Flava TV named "Hanging With Redzz". On Monday, 8 August 2011, Redzz was a BBC Introducing artist. His songs were played on radio as well as being interviewed via telephone. Redzz revealed in the interview that some of his inspirations in music growing up were the likes of Eminem, Dr. Dre, 2Pac & Michael Jackson but to name a few. As it was the same day as the London Riots, Redzz was also asked his opinion on the rioting and he responded "Well, I think in the poorer communities they're brushed to the side and people try to cover them up rather than trying to find the root of the problem. Just chucking these guys in jail isn't going to solve anything, we need to find the root of the problem, why have we come to this?". In September 2011, Redzz released a new entrance theme song named 'I Gotta Win It' which features boxing champion Amir Khan. 'I Gotta Win It' was promoted personally by Amir Khan on his official Facebook and Twitter pages. In March 2012, Redzz was one of a handful of rappers to be selected for the first instalment of Freestyle Frenzy, a new show aired on Flava TV. All the rappers that appear in the show free-styled 60 bars to the camera without stopping and the viewers voted by Tweeting Flava TV's Twitter using the hashtag key followed by Freestyle Frenzy and the artist they wanted to vote for. Redzz won with over fifty per cent of votes in the first showing of the episode he appeared in.

=== Charity work ===
==== NACOA ====
On 18 May 2012, Redzz teamed up with National Association for Children of Alcoholics also known as NACOA to help raise awareness on the effects of alcoholism, particularly children with alcohol dependent parents and is planning on donating some of the proceeds for his single towards the charity. On 3 June 2012, Redzz performed 'Through The Eyes' at the annual Upfest, a charitable festival in association with NACOA.

==== Celebrity Soccer Six ====
On 20 May 2012, Redzz competed in the Celebrity Soccer Six charity football tournament held in West Ham United's The Boleyn Ground (Upton Park) stadium. Redzz was in the same team as Britain's Got Talent 2012 finalists The Loveable Rogues and boy band Twenty Twenty. During a match against E4 british sitcom The Inbetweeners Redzz scored a goal but also said on Twitter the next day that someone from The Inbetweeners tried to foul him on purpose and hurt his leg in retaliation. On 2 June 2012, Redzz also competed in the Celebrity Soccer Six charity football tournament held in Burnley FC's Turf Moor stadium. Redzz was in the same team as Danny Dyer, Tamer Hassan & Starboy Nathan. Redzz team got to the semi-final of the competition losing to the cast of Merlin (TV series) on Sudden death penalties when Lonyo kicked the ball way over the crossbar after being told to retake the penalty controversially by the referee.

== Discography ==
=== Albums ===
- Here Comes Trouble (2011) [Free Download]

=== Mixtapes ===
- Out Wid Da Old, In Wid Da Nu (2009) [Rare Mixtape]

=== EPs ===
- Fame (2010) [Rare EP]

=== Singles ===
- "Magic Magic" featuring Soul Nana (2008)
- "Bad Enough" featuring Shade Sheist, TQ & Young Noble of The Outlawz (2009)
- "Hot Sauce" (2010)
- "Puppet Master" featuring Sway & Ayo (2011)
- "Tables Turn" featuring Leddra Chapman (2012)
- "Through The Eyes" (2012)
