= Oliver Close =

Housing estate in Leyton, London

Coordinates: 51.561°N 0.016°W

Oliver Close Estate is a housing estate in Leyton, London Borough of Waltham Forest in East London, England. From 1967 to 1996 the estate contained 500 flats in five high-rise buildings. It is currently owned and administered by the Community-based Housing Association.

== History ==
Archaeological investigations beginning in 1996 showed that a palisaded Late Bronze Age settlement had stood on the Oliver Close site in the 9th and 10th centuries. Afterward, however, the site was only in marginal use until the expansion of London reached the Lower Lea Valley in the late 1800s. During World War II, prefabricated Anderson shelters were set up on the Oliver Close site for protection against air raids. After the war, the first public housing development on the site also used prefabricated buildings.

=== High-rise development ===
The history of the modern housing estate began in 1963 with approval of construction of a high-rise estate in the Municipal Borough of Leyton. With the reorganization of London government, the estate came under the jurisdiction of the London Borough of Waltham Forest in 1965.

The estate was built in two stages. The stage approved in 1963 consisted of three 20-storey buildings, each containing 100 flats. The buildings were named Arthur Punshion Tower, Clifford Hicks Tower, and James Collins Tower.

The second stage, at Oliver Close and Auckland Road, was approved in 1967 and consisted of two 20-storey towers with 200 flats. The buildings were named Terence Messenger Tower and Stanley Horstead Tower.

- Arthur Punshion Tower
- Clifford Hicks Tower
- James Collins Tower
- Stanley Horstead Tower
- Terence Messenger Tower

=== Regeneration ===
As high-rise estates became associated with overcrowded conditions, poverty, and crime, governments gradually changed their approach to public housing. In 1996 ownership of Oliver Close and other housing estates was assigned to the Waltham Forest Housing Action Trust. By 2002 all five towers at Oliver Close had been demolished, and in April 2002 the Housing Action Trust was disbanded. Oliver Close came under the control of the Community-based Housing Association. As of 2007, 330 new homes had been built.
