= Telling Tales =

Telling Tales may refer to:

- Telling Tales (anthology), 2004 anthology
- Telling Tales (album), 2009 album by Leddra Chapman
- Telling Tales (film), 2015 Turkish film
- "Telling Tales" (Vera), a 2011 television episode
