= Cann Hall =

Coordinates: 51.558°N 0.012°E

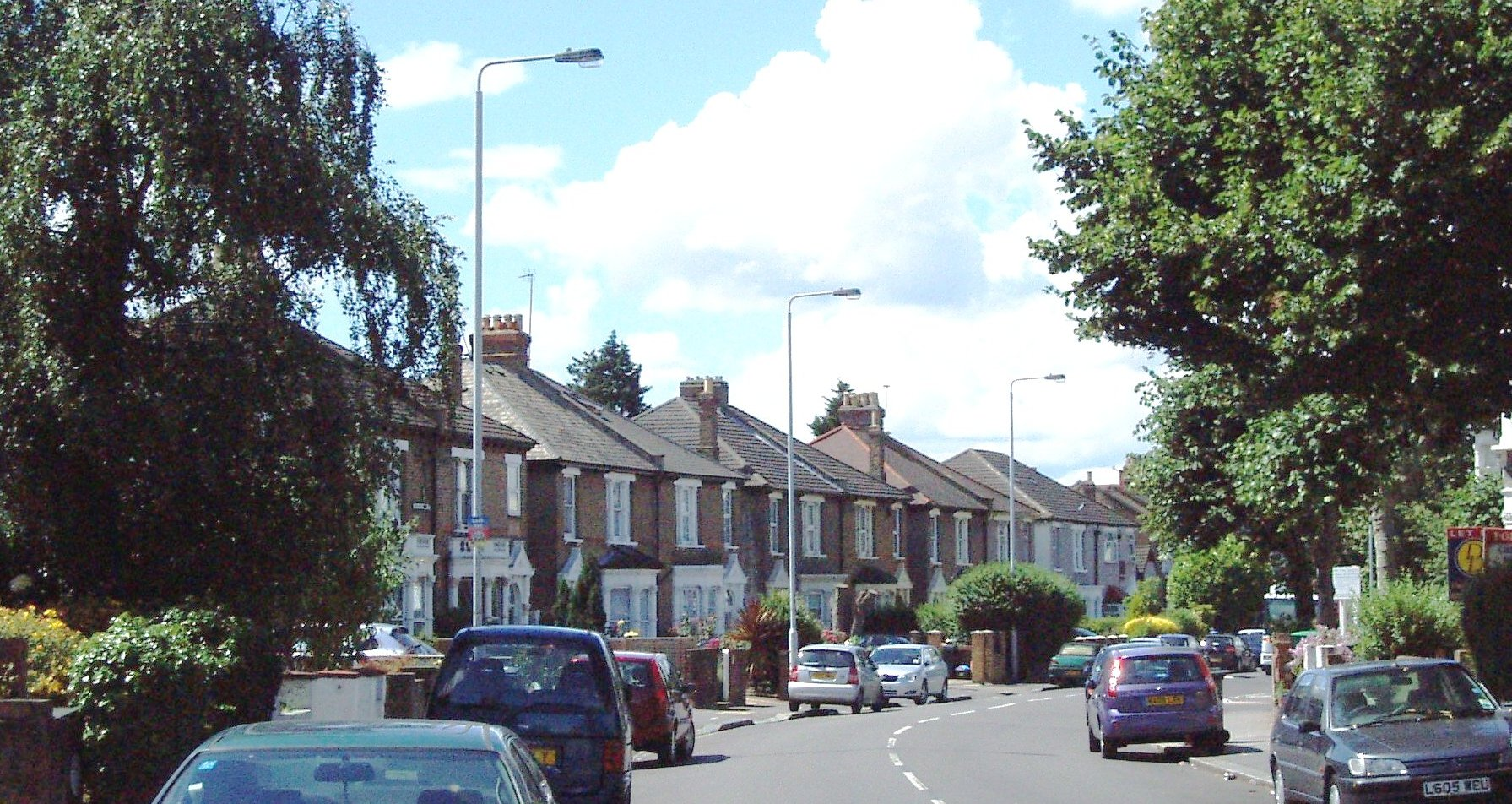
- Houses on Cann Hall Road

- Location within Greater London
- Population: 13,799 (Cann Hall ward 2011)
- OS grid reference: TQ395875
- London borough: Waltham Forest
- Ceremonial county: Greater London
- Region: London
- Country: England
- Sovereign state: United Kingdom
- Post town: LONDON
- Postcode district: E11
- Dialling code: 020
- Police: Metropolitan
- Fire: London
- Ambulance: London
- UK Parliament: Leyton & Wanstead
- London Assembly: North East

Cann Hall is an area in the London Borough of Waltham Forest lying to the south of Leytonstone and Leyton. It is north of Stratford and Forest Gate and west of Wanstead Flats, the southernmost tip of Epping Forest. The Cann Hall area was anciently part of the parish of Wanstead. From 1875 until the creation of the London Borough of Waltham Forest in 1965 the area was administered as part of Leyton; a Cann Hall civil parish existed within Leyton between 1894 and 1965.

== History ==
The Domesday Book of 1086 lists the landowner as Hugh de Montfort, Lord of Montfort-sur-Risle, whose family took possession of a great deal of land after the Norman conquest. His daughter Adela gave the holding to the canons of Holy Trinity, Aldgate in 1121, and it is likely that the later name of the manor is a contraction of "Canons Hall".

The manor of Cann Hall was originally in the parish of Leyton, but by the early 13th century had been transferred to the parish of Wanstead.

The priory at Holy Trinity retained Cann Hall until the Dissolution of the Monasteries by King Henry VIII in 1532. The only buildings attached to the farm at that time were two old barns and a little cottage, but nevertheless several petitions were made to the crown for ownership. Bought by one Nicholas Sympson, the manor then passed through a succession of short-lived ownerships until 1671, when it was sold to William Colegrave for £2750.

The Colegrave Arms pub, now converted to Cann Hall Mosque

The Colegrave family continued to hold Cann Hall as a country estate in the early 19th century. Its tenants were among those whose livestock was permitted to graze on the adjacent Wanstead Flats, which at the time belonged to the Crown. With others they fought against the buying up of the Flats by private landowners, but in 1851-2 they lost part of the Flats in a protracted legal battle (though later much of the land was saved for the public, and is now administered by the City of London Corporation).

By the 1860s the original cottage had become an enlarged residence with ornamental gardens situated to the south of Cann Hall Road, and the buildings north of the road were known as Cann Hall Farm. None of these buildings has survived. Most of the estate was sold for development in 1880–95, though the Colegraves retained part of it until 1900.

The area has become a built-up part of north-east London, consisting largely of late Victorian and early 20th century terraced housing. Some of the street names retain a link with the past: Colegrave Road, Selby Road, Manbey Street (all associated with the Colegrave family) - and halfway along Cann Hall Road is the Colegrave Arms pub which is now a mosque.

From at least the early 13th century, Cann Hall was part of the parish of Wanstead in the Becontree Hundred of Essex. In 1854, Wanstead parish was made a local board district, administered by an elected local board. In 1873, neighbouring Leyton was made a local government district, also run by a local board, covering the parish of Leyton and part of Walthamstow parish. In 1875, the area then known as "Wanstead Slip" which lay to the south of Leyton was transferred from the Wanstead district to the Leyton district, whilst remaining part of Wanstead parish. Under the Local Government Act 1894, such local government districts were reconstituted as urban districts, and civil parishes were no longer allowed to straddle district boundaries. The part of Wanstead parish within Leyton Urban District therefore became a separate civil parish, which was named Cann Hall. As an urban parish it was not eligible for a parish council, with the lowest elected tier of local government being Leyton Urban District Council. In 1926, Leyton Urban District was incorporated to become the Municipal Borough of Leyton.

The Cann Hall civil parish had an area of 223 acres (0.90 km^{2}). The population in 1901 was 22,232 and by 1951 it had dropped to 14,424. The parish was abolished on 1 April 1965, along with the borough of Leyton, as part of the reforms which created Greater London and the London Borough of Waltham Forest which now covers the area.

== Transport and locale ==
Nearby places

- Leyton
- Stratford
- Maryland
- Forest Gate
- Wanstead Flats

The nearest London Underground station is Leytonstone on the Central line.

Nearest railway station

- Maryland railway station
- Forest Gate railway station
- Leytonstone High Road railway station
