= Leyton =

Town in east London, England

Coordinates: 51°34′12″N 0°00′54″W

- Town
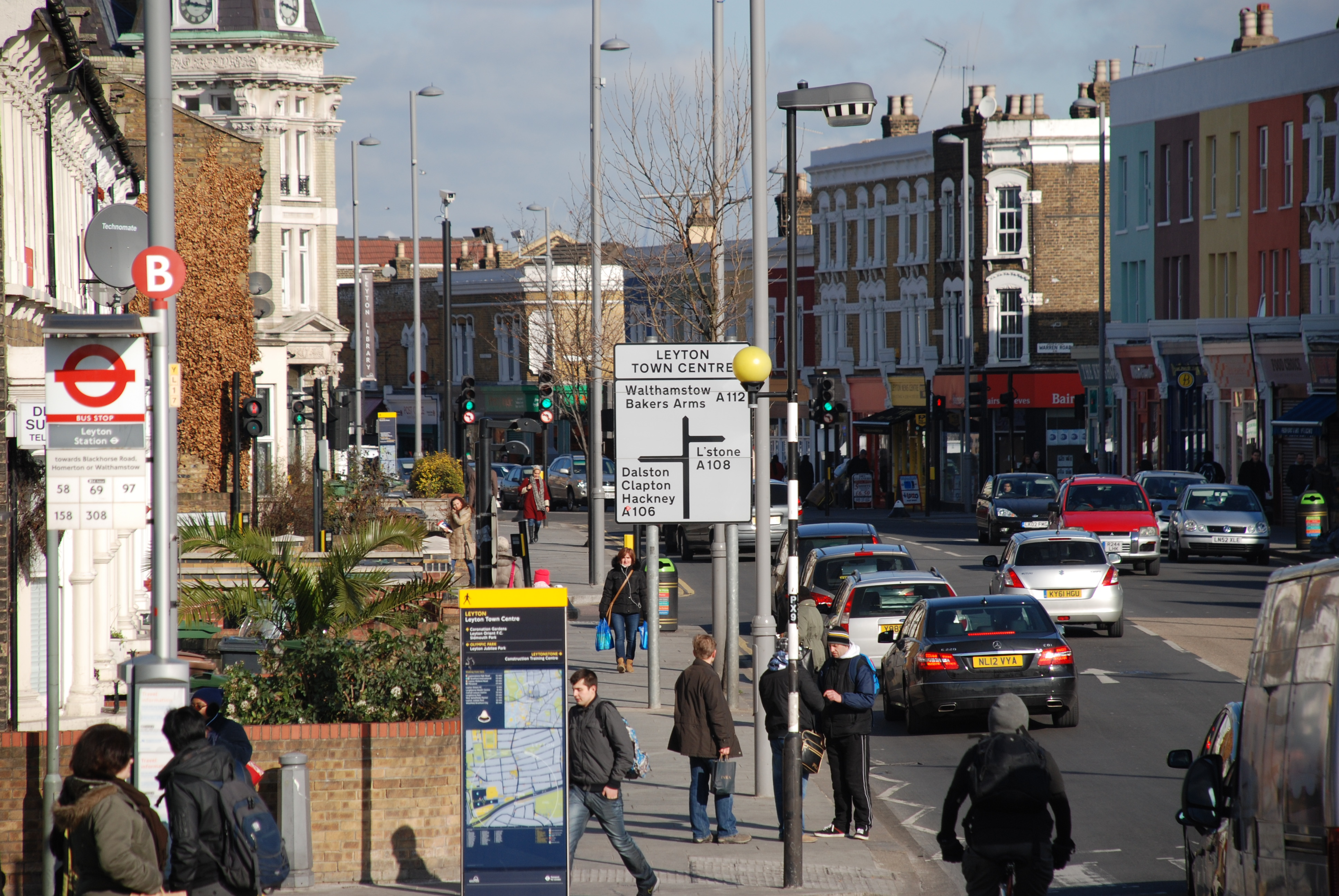
- High Road, Leyton

- Location within Greater London
- Population: 14,184 (2011 Census. Ward)
- OS grid reference: TQ375865
- London borough: Waltham Forest
- Ceremonial county: Greater London
- Region: London
- Country: England
- Sovereign state: United Kingdom
- Post town: LONDON
- Postcode district: E10, E15, E20
- Dialling code: 020
- Police: Metropolitan
- Fire: London
- Ambulance: London
- UK Parliament: Leyton & Wanstead
- London Assembly: North East

Leyton (/ˈleɪtən/ LAY-tən) is a town in East London, England, within the London Borough of Waltham Forest. It borders Walthamstow to the north, Leytonstone to the east, and Stratford to the south, with Clapton, Hackney Wick and Homerton, across the River Lea, to the west. The area includes New Spitalfields Market, Leyton Orient Football Club, as well as part of the Queen Elizabeth Olympic Park. The town consists largely of terraced houses built between 1870 and 1910, interspersed with some modern housing estates. It is 6.2 miles (10 km) north-east of Charing Cross.

Leyton was an ancient parish, also known as Low Leyton or Leyton St Mary. It formed part of the Becontree hundred of the ancient county of Essex. The parish contained the two settlements of Low Leyton and Leytonstone and remained largely rural until the 19th century. The area saw significant development in the late 19th century, becoming part of the conurbation of London, similar to much of south-west Essex. It became part of the Metropolitan Police District in 1839 and has been part of the London postal district since its inception in 1856.

A Leyton local government district was established in 1873, covering Leyton and Leytonstone. The district was enlarged in 1875 to also include Cann Hall. It became an urban district in 1894 and gained municipal borough status in 1926. In 1965, the Municipal Borough of Leyton merged with the neighbouring boroughs of Walthamstow and Chingford to form the London Borough of Waltham Forest, a local government district of Greater London.

== History ==
Paleolithic implements and fossil bones show that early man hunted in Leyton.

A Roman cemetery and the foundations of a Roman villa have been found here. Huge ancient foundations, including arches of Roman appearance were recorded in 1718 at Grange Park Road, about 400m to the northeast of the Oliver Close Estate, with reports describing ancient ruins covering 2 acres. Many stray finds of Roman date have been recovered in the vicinity of Grange Park and Roman ditches were found to the north at Church Road

One or more Roman buildings were found in 1718 in enlarging a garden on the north side of the parish churchyard. The property was then occupied by a Mr. Gansell and apparently called "The Grange"; it was described in 1771 as "between the manor house and the canal, where the garden now is," and the site is now somewhere in the neighbourhood of Grange Park and Manor Roads, ... The remains were traced over an extent of two acres, and consisted of "very large and strong foundations, in one place all stone with considerable arches, an arched doorway with steps down to it, but quite filled up with gravel. In many foundations were a great quantity of Roman tiles and bricks mixed with more modern materials." Two wells were also found, and "a great quantity of oak timber, some 8, some 10 inches square, mortised together like a floor."

Numerous Roman coins, together with "bitts of silver with Saxon characters" were also turned up. A later account speaks of "a large arched gate with mouldings, and the portal to a large gate 9 or 10 feet high, 5 or 6 feet broad, the wall 4 feet thick or more," all at a depth of 6 feet. Foundations also occurred in the ploughed fields then adjoining the garden on the north and west, but nothing was observed on the south and east.

From Anglo-Saxon times, Leyton has been part of the county of Essex. The name means "settlement (tun) on the River Lea" and was also known until 1921 as "Low Leyton".

The Domesday Book of 1086 lists six estates or manors at the vill of Leituna or Leintuna in the Becontree Hundred of Essex. There were 51 households recorded across the six Leyton manors at that time.

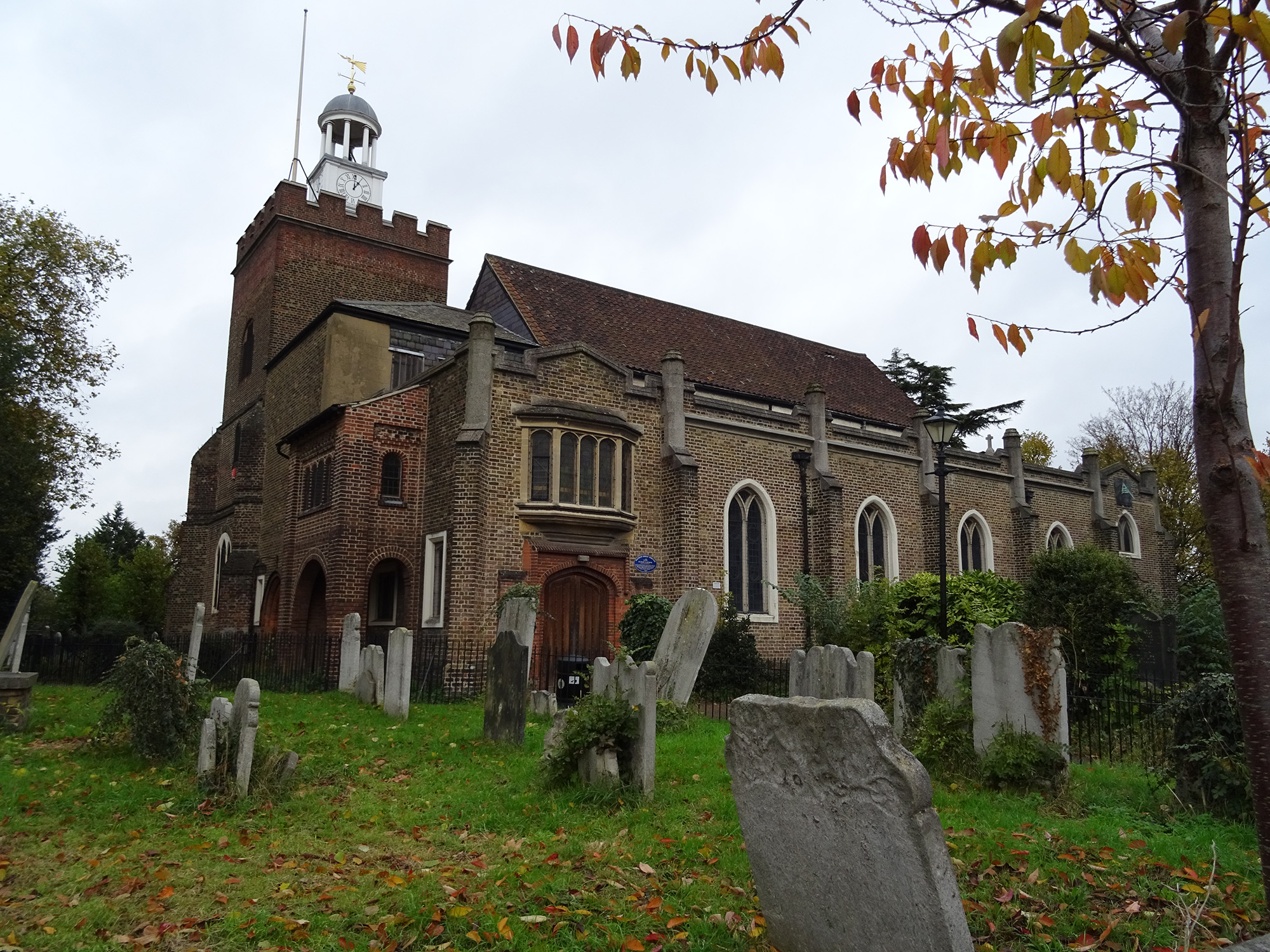
St Mary's Church

The ancient parish of Leyton, also known as Leyton St Mary or Low Leyton, was in two parts. The main part included the settlements of Leytonstone and Leyton itself (historically known as Low Leyton). The detached part of the parish to the north included the area around Lea Bridge Road. The two parts were separated by a long, thin exclave of Walthamstow parish, known as the "Walthamstow Slip". To the south, the parish of Leyton had anciently included the manor of Cann Hall, which was transferred to the parish of Wanstead sometime prior to the 13th century.

Leyton's parish church of St Mary the Virgin was largely rebuilt in the 17th century.

A local government district was created in 1873, covering the parish of Leyton or Low Leyton and the Walthamstow Slip. The order creating the district called it "Low Leyton", but by 1875 the district was being called just "Leyton" in official documents. The district was extended in 1875 to also include the Cann Hall area of Wanstead parish to the south, also known as the Wanstead Slip. The Walthamstow Slip was transferred to the parish of Low Leyton in 1878.

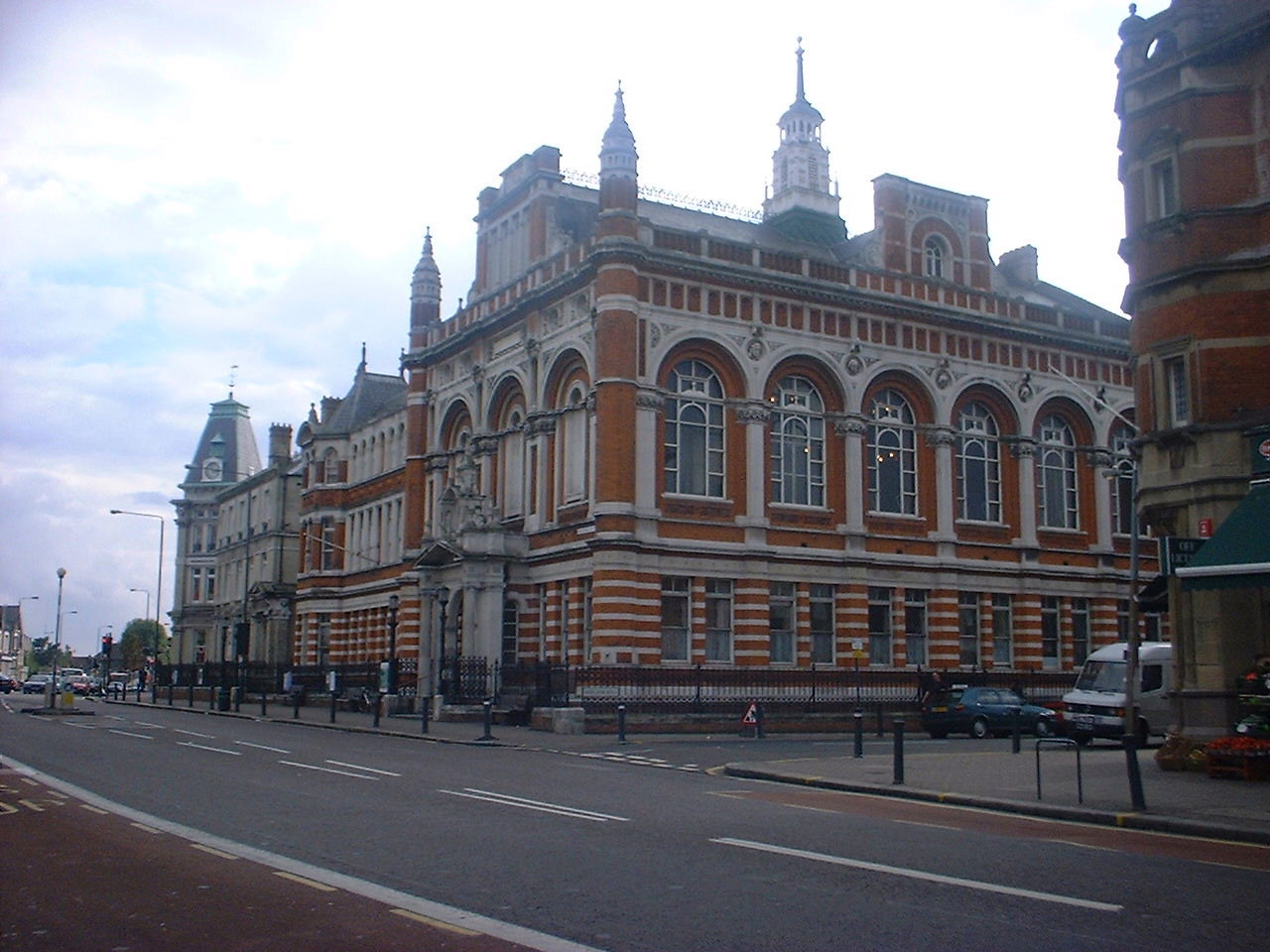
Leyton Town Hall

Local government districts were reconstituted as urban districts under the Local Government Act 1894. The Leyton Urban District comprised the two civil parishes of Cann Hall and Leyton or Low Leyton. The ambiguity in the name of the latter parish was resolved in 1921 when the name was confirmed to be just Leyton. Leyton Town Hall on Adelaide Road was built in 1895 to serve as the council's headquarters. In 1926 the urban district was incorporated as a borough, becoming the Municipal Borough of Leyton.

In 1965, the borough of Leyton was abolished and was combined with that of Walthamstow and Chingford to form the London Borough of Waltham Forest, within the new county of Greater London. Although Leyton did not become officially part of London until 1965, the borough formed part of London's built-up area and had been part of the London postal district since its inception in 1856 and the Metropolitan Police District since 1839.

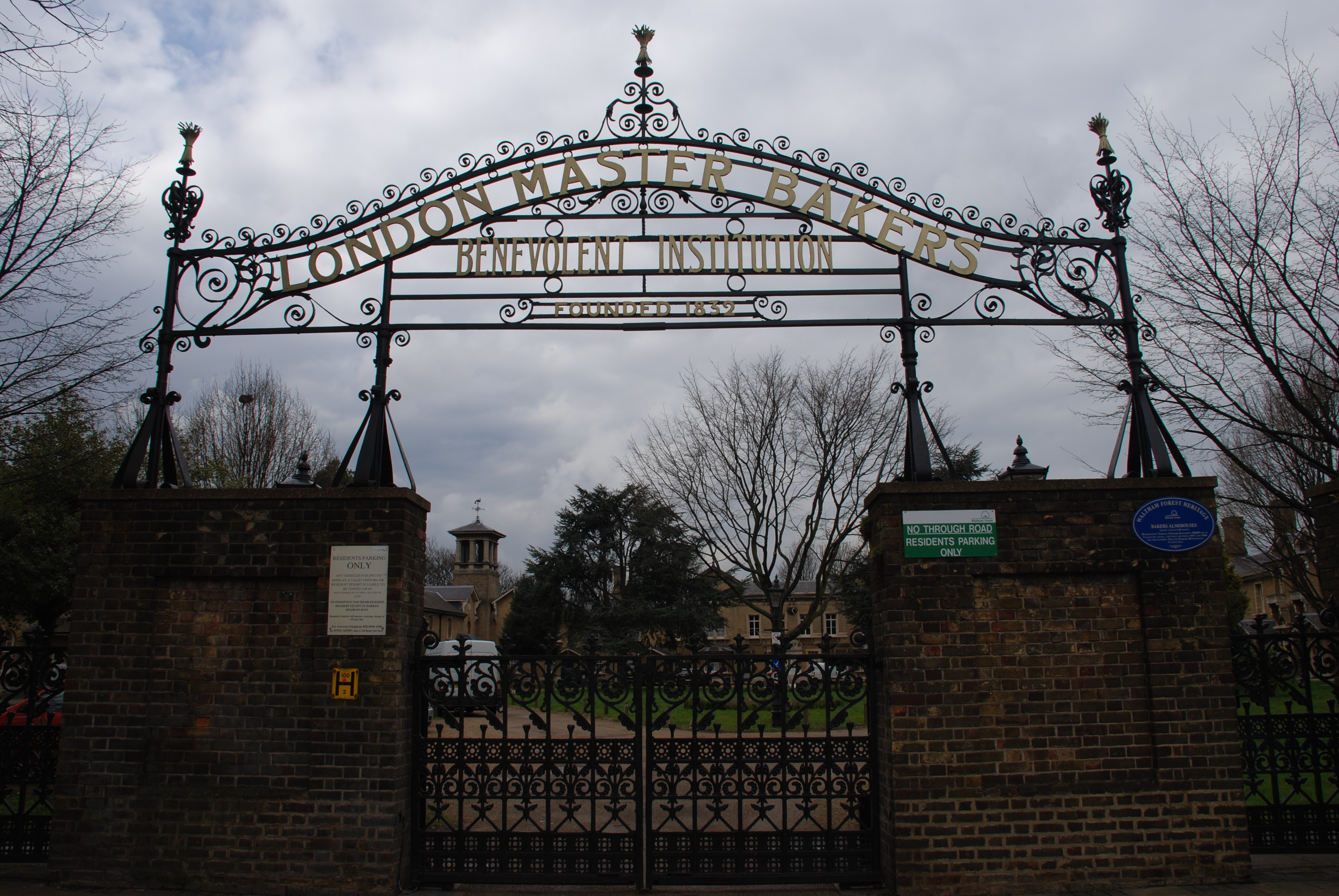
Gates to London Master Bakers' Benevolent Institution almshouses

The main route through the town is the High Road, which forms part of the ancient route to Waltham Abbey. At the top end of the High Road is a crossroads with Lea Bridge Road and Hoe Street. This junction and the surrounding district is known as Bakers Arms, named after the public house which has now closed down. The pub was named in honour of the almshouses on Lea Bridge Road built in 1857 by the London Master Bakers' Benevolent Institution.

During the 17th and 18th centuries, Leyton was a "pretty retiring place from London" for wealthy merchants and bankers; in 1766 there were said to be 50 or 60 gentlemen with houses in the parish. Leyton's development from an agricultural community to an industrial and residential suburb was given impetus by the arrival of the railway. First at Lea Bridge Station in 1840, then at Low Leyton in 1856 (now Leyton Underground). Finally Leyton Midland Road opened in 1894, after an elevated line had been built on brick arches across the already developed streets. However, not all the green spaces were lost, 200 acres (81 ha) of Epping Forest within Leyton's borders were preserved by the Epping Forest Act 1878. In 1897 Leyton Urban District Council purchased the land for a formal park close to the town hall; it opened in 1903 as Coronation Gardens, named after the coronation of King Edward VII. In 1905, the "Lammas land", common pasture land on Leyton Marshes, was purchased by the council for use as a recreation ground.

In World War I, about 1,300 houses were damaged by Zeppelin raids. By the 1920s, it had become a built-up and thriving urban industrial area known for manufacturing neckties and for its Thermos factory. During the Blitz of World War II, Leyton suffered as a target because of its proximity to the London Docks and Temple Mills rail yard. The yard (named after an ancient mill owned by the Knights Templar) is now reduced in size as part of it has become a retail park 'Leyton Mills', whilst the rest has been renovated to serve as a depot for high-speed Eurostar trains.

After World War Two, Leyton suffered from large-scale industrial decline in the second half of the 20th century. But, like much of east London, Leyton, which also borders the Queen Elizabeth Olympic Park, has benefited from significant regeneration projects over the past decade. Parks have been spruced up, some new small parks and gardens created and several tower blocks have been demolished. The millennium was marked with a clock tower in the Lea Bridge Rd area and a major piece of street art at Baker's Arms. And, most recently, in the build-up to the Olympics, Waltham Forest Borough Council spent £475,000 restoring 41 shopfronts on the part of Leyton High Road closest to the 2012 London Olympic Games site. The Olympics authority also funded the smartening up of pavements and street furniture.

== Geography ==
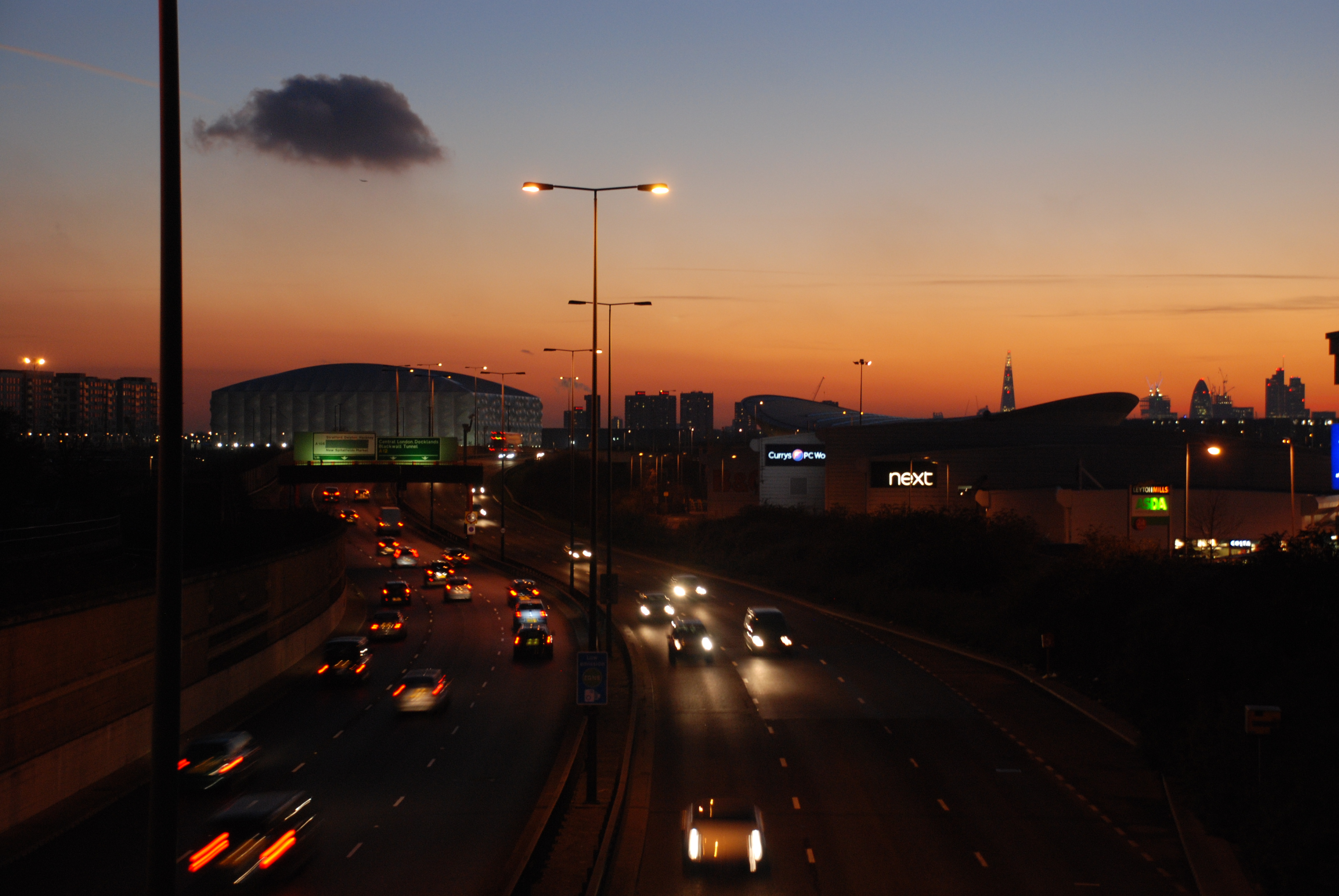
View of A12 from opposite Leyton Underground station

Leyton is in the Lower Lea Valley, the river forming its western boundary. The area rises from low-lying marshland along the river Lea to over 90 feet at Whipps Cross on the southern edge of Epping Forest. Leyton is partially bisected by the A12 (M11 link road, built in the 1990s), with most of the district lying on the north-west side of this busy traffic artery through east London.

The High Road Leyton bridge crossing the A12 offers views of the Olympic Park, which also borders the district, as well as of skyscrapers further west. It borders Walthamstow along Lea Bridge Road and areas of the London Borough of Hackney via the River Lea.

== Areas of Leyton ==
- Bakers Arms
- Leyton
- Lea Bridge
- Grove Green
- Temple Mills

== Demography ==
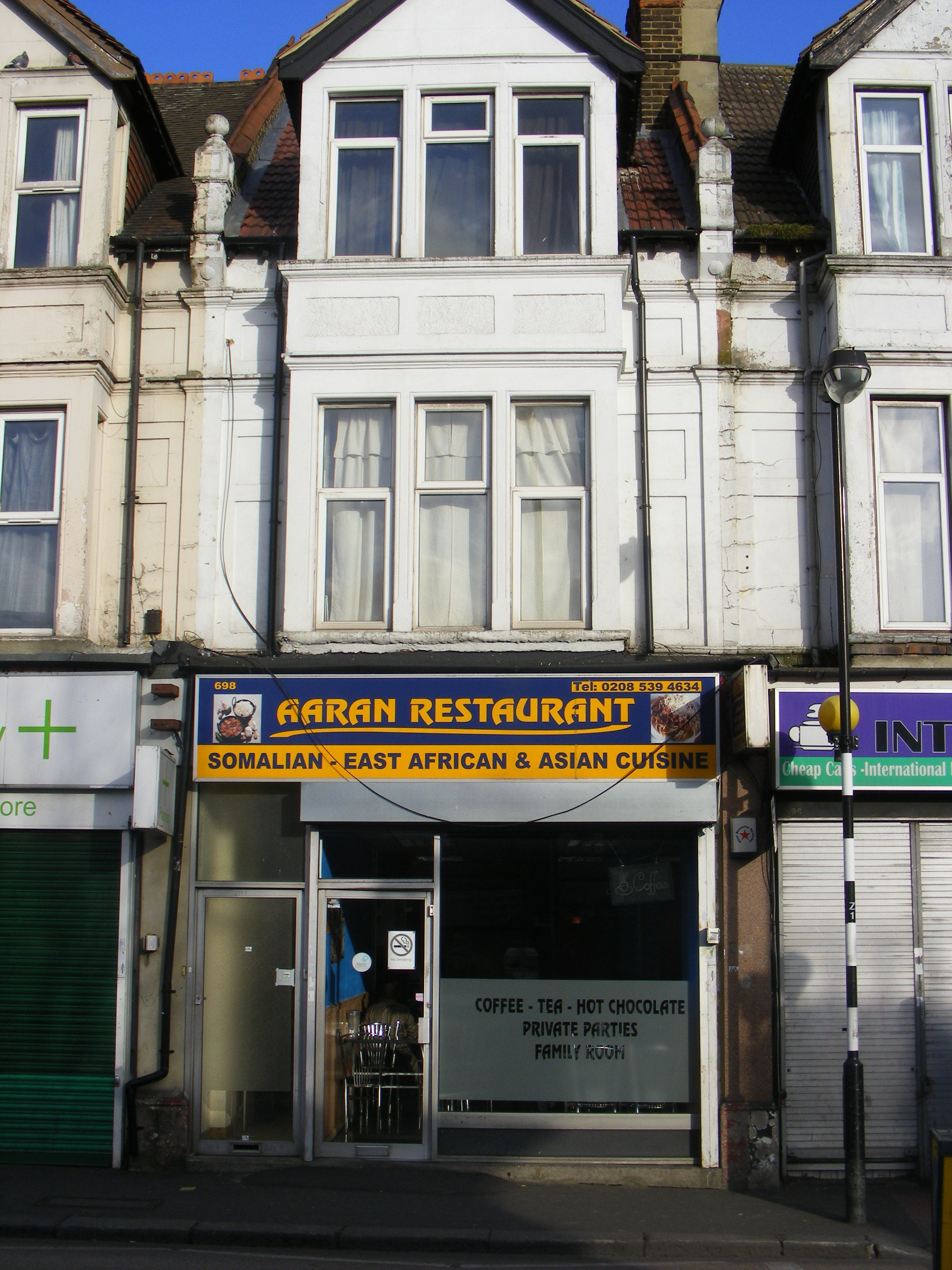
A Somali restaurant in Leyton High Road in 2012.

Leyton, which comprises three electoral wards with a total population of 42,061, is a diverse district. Between 61 and 69 per cent of its residents are either Black, Asian, or from an ethnic minority, according to the London Borough of Waltham Forest profile reports for the Leyton (ward), Grove Green and Lea Bridge (ward) wards. This compares to 55.1% in the Borough as a whole, according to the 2011 United Kingdom census. Within these groups, there are many people whose origins are from Russia, North Africa, Ghana, Nigeria, Jamaica, Ireland, Portugal, Cyprus, and Italy as well as newer arrivals from South Africa, Bosnia, Serbia, and Poland. Moreover, more than half the population is under the age of 30, according to the most recent census. It is also highly multi-cultural, with just 34% of the population recorded as White British, the lowest White British proportion in Waltham Forest.

Once a more traditional, working class district, it has become much more gentrified and expensive in recent years. A number of articles have referenced the large numbers of young professionals and other university-educated people moving into Leyton, and its subsequent gentrification and location as a current 'hot spot' to buy in. The area was referenced in the July 2015 edition of Vogue (magazine), which said: "All eyes are on Leyton and Stratford [right now]." More widely in Waltham Forest, the borough has seen an influx of those who cannot afford higher house prices or rent in neighbouring Hackney as well as areas such as Bethnal Green and Bow in the nearby London Borough of Tower Hamlets. Related to this, Waltham Forest has been one of the fastest rising boroughs in terms of house prices since 2013.

== Facilities ==
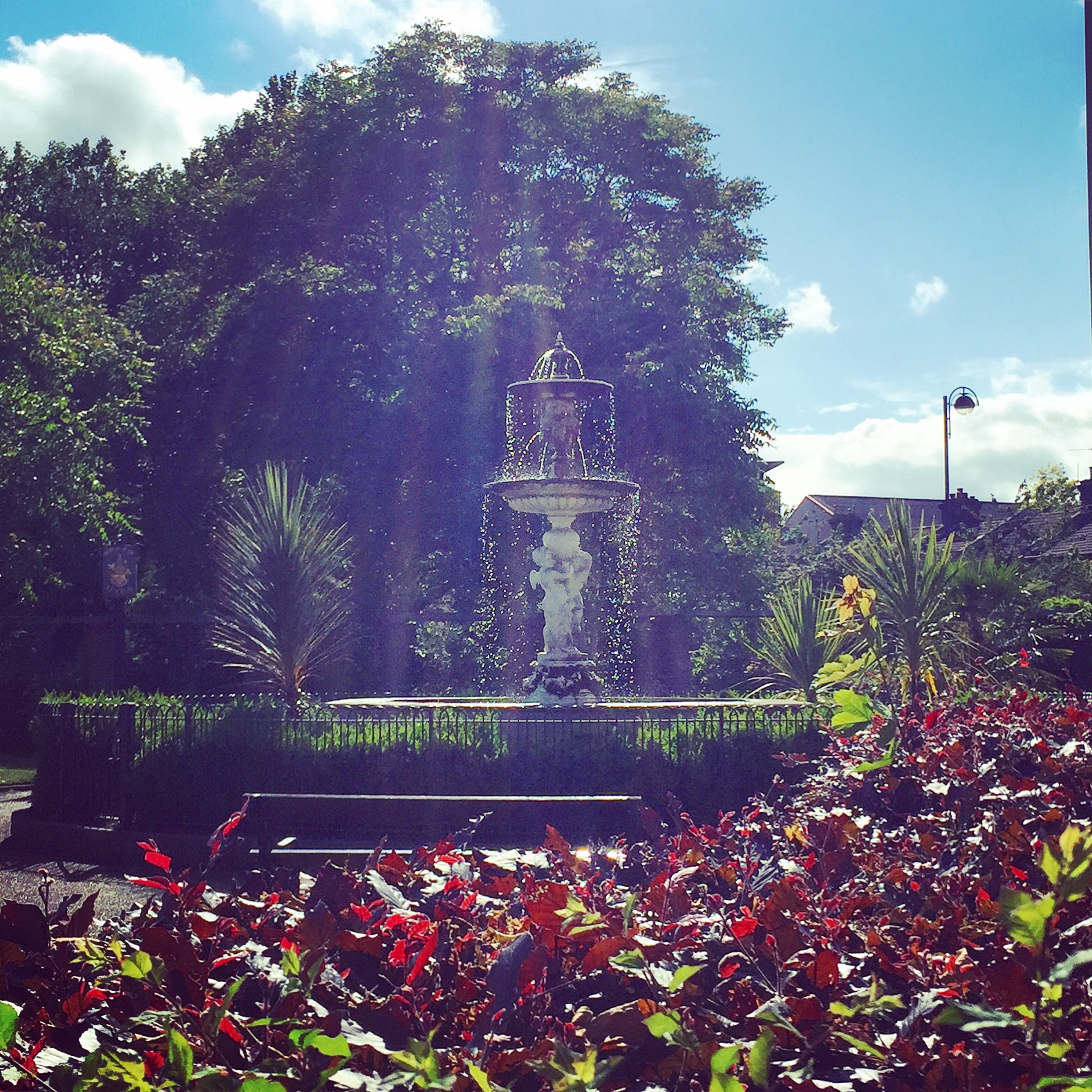
Coronation Gardens

The New Spitalfields Market, relocated in 1991 from the Old Spitalfields market, is the UK's leading horticultural market specialising in exotic fruit and vegetables.

There are two main shopping areas in the district, located at opposite ends of the High Road. There is a large retail park at Leyton Mills, next to the station. This has a large, 24-hour Asda store, a B&Q store and a selection of furniture and electrical stores. At the north end of the town, Baker's Arms has a more traditional selection of shops lining Lea Bridge Road and the High Road, including a branch of Tesco.

The local police station is at Boreham Close near Leyton Midland Road station. It moved from Francis Road in December 2012.

Restaurants reflect the diversity of Leyton's population, with cuisines on offer including Turkish, Portuguese, Polish, Indian, Mauritian, Somali and Cypriot. There are also several fast-food takeaway shops, cafes and bakeries.

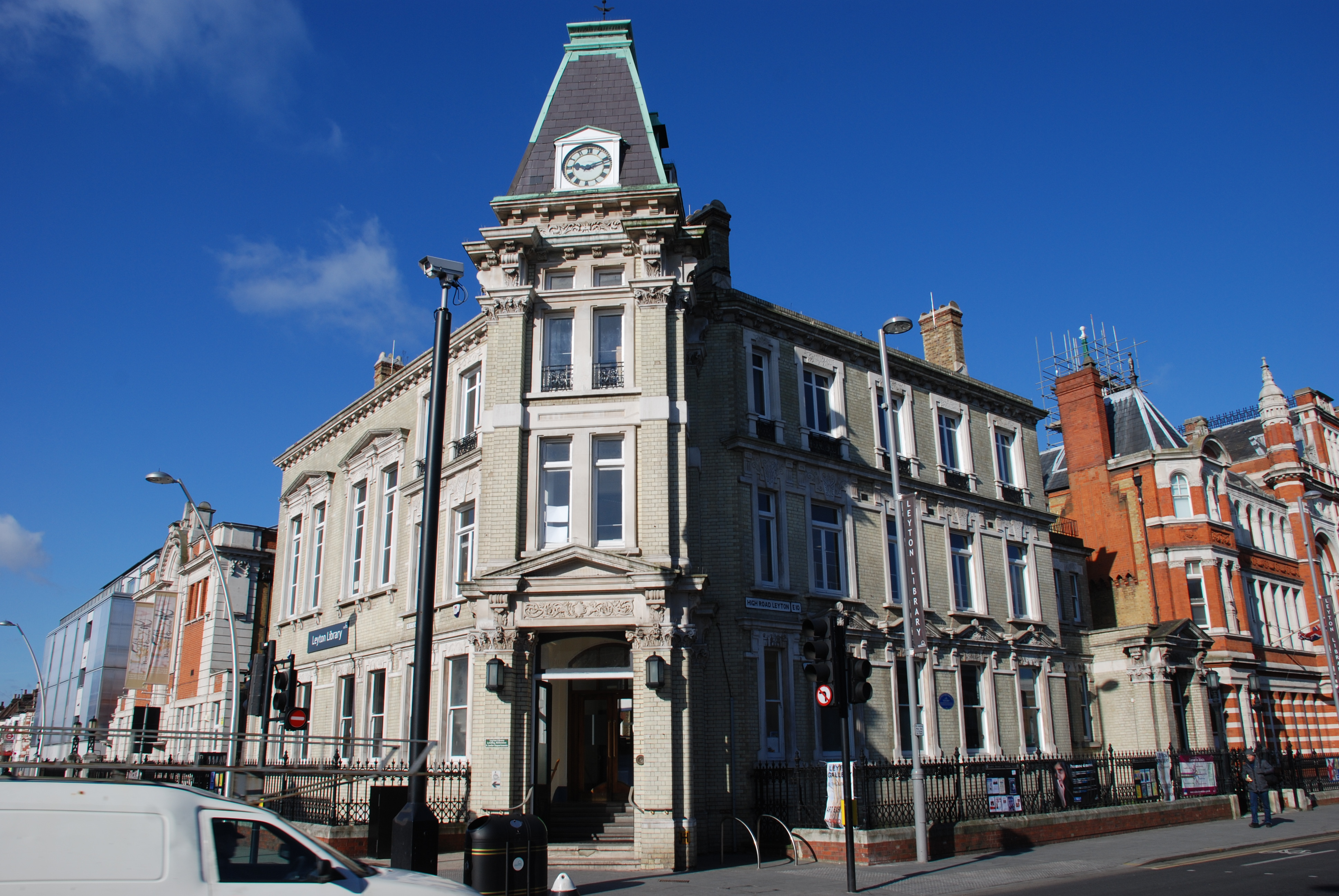
Leyton Library

Leyton lies on the eastern side of the Hackney Marshes, one of the largest areas of open land in London. A bridge to the marshes crosses the Orient Way road and railway tracks from Leyton Jubilee Park, which was created as a merger of two previously separate playing fields to mark the 60th anniversary of the reign of Queen Elizabeth II.

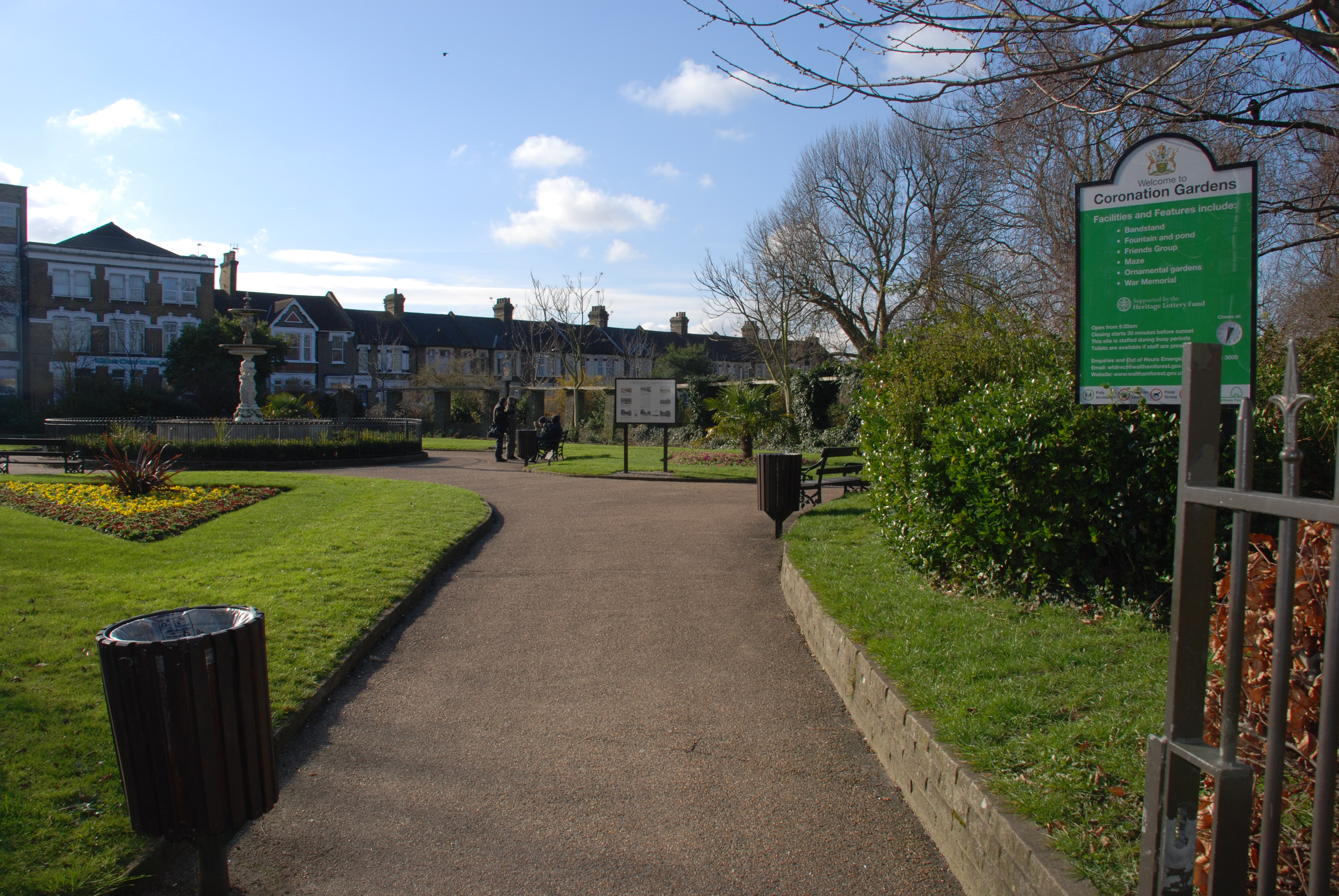
Coronation Gardens

A major focal point in the centre of Leyton is Coronation Gardens, a park built in 1902 to commemorate the coronation that year of King Edward VII. It includes a fountain, landscaped gardens, a bandstand and a children's maze.

On the High Road, near the site of the Bakers Arms, there is also a municipal gym and Leyton Leisure Centre swimming pool, which was formerly called the Leyton Leisure Lagoon and was reopened in October 2013 following a period of renovation.

There are two public libraries in Leyton. One on the High Road next door to the former Town Hall, and the other on Lea Bridge Road which has been recently modernised to offer extensive computer facilities.

The London Borough of Waltham Forest also operates Brooks Farm, a city farm in Skelton Lane Park, near Leyton Midland Road station. It is free to visitors and the livestock include pigs, sheep, cows, horses and llamas.

A recent regeneration of Ive Farm Fields in 2018 has brought a host of new facilities to the area, with floodlit sports pitches, a running track, volleyball courts and a series of walking routes. In memory of those who lost their lives in Waltham Forest during the Covid pandemic, a memorial plaque and tree has been placed in Jubilee Park as a tribute.

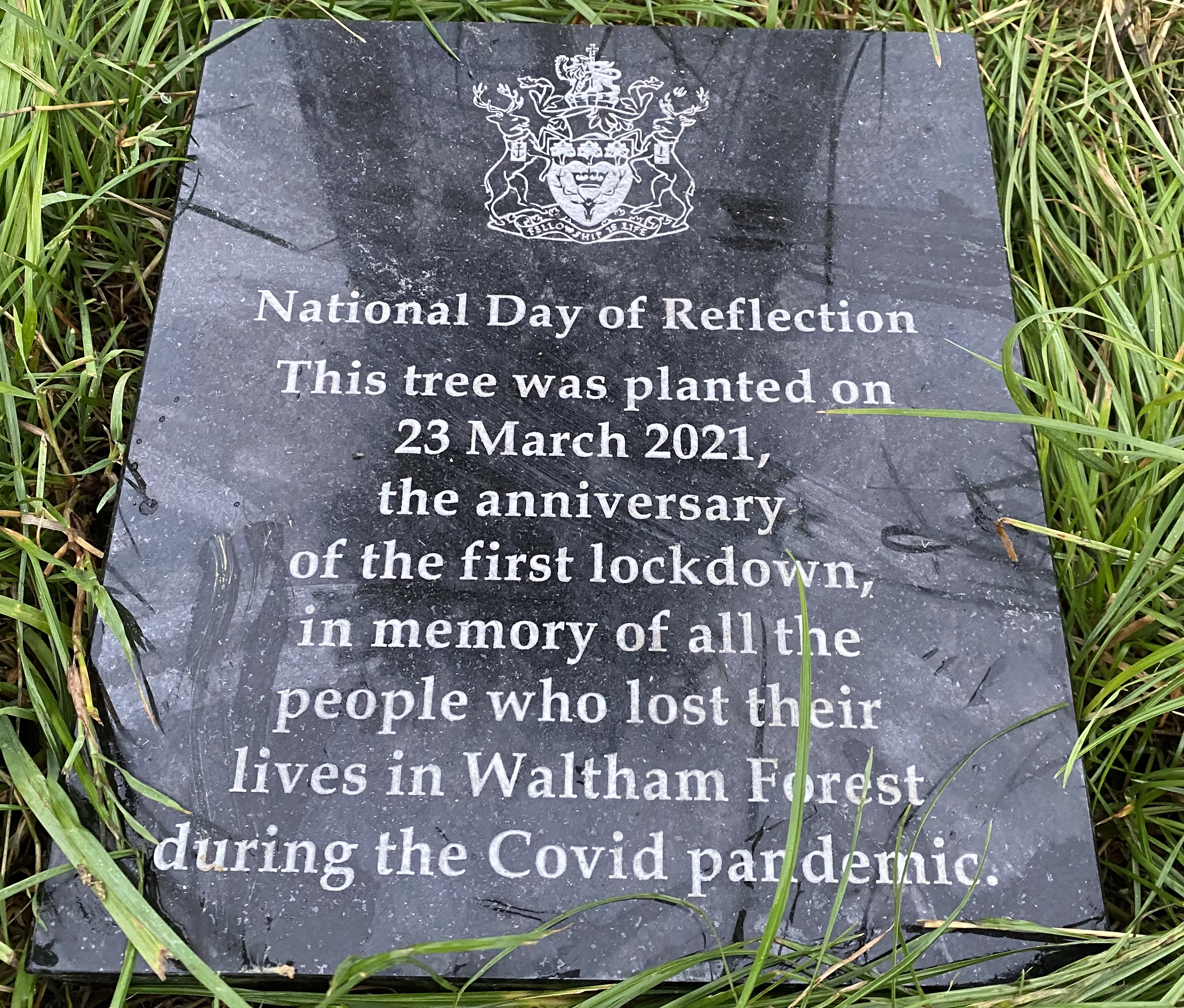
COVID pandemic memorial plaque

== Housing ==
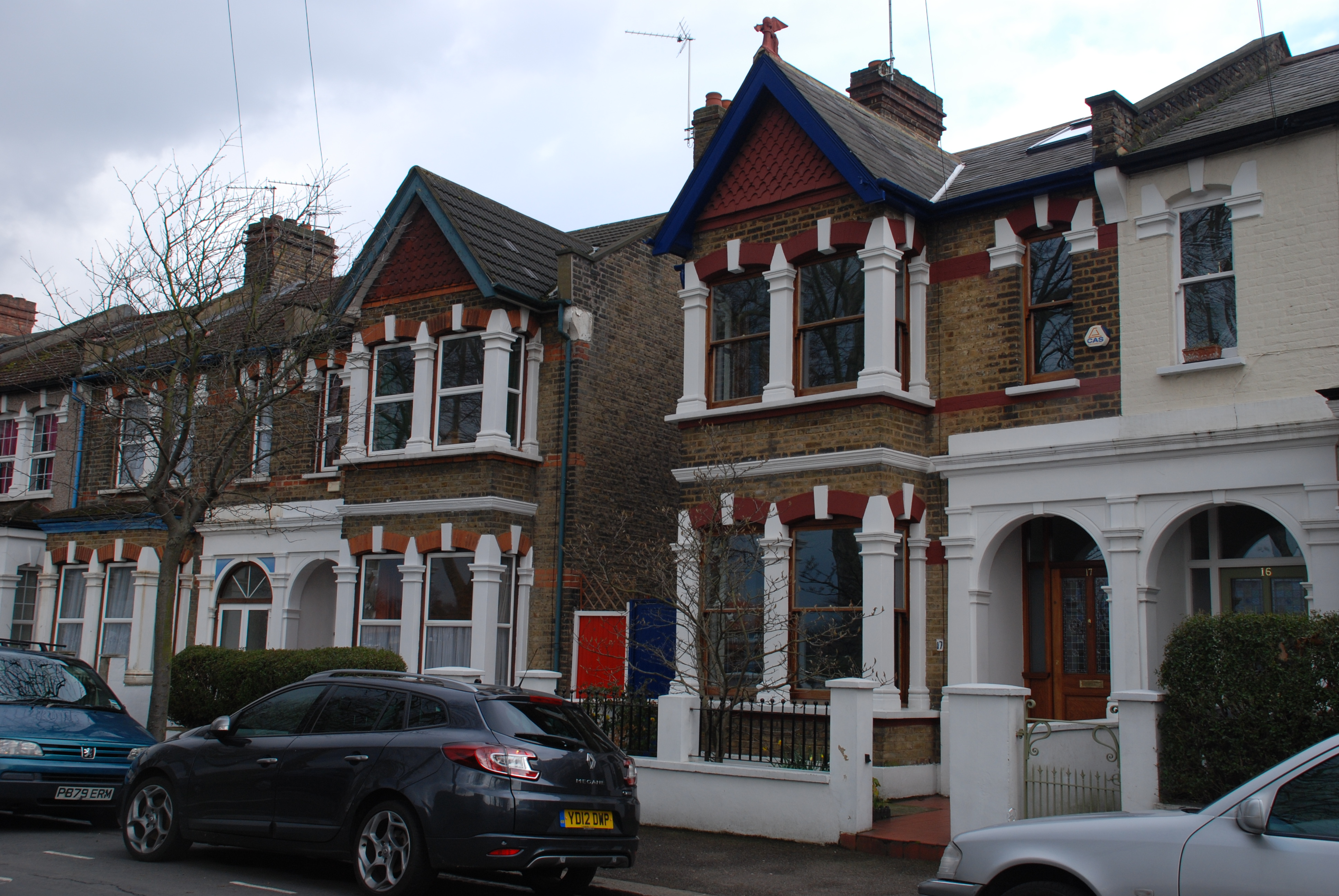
Traditional Victorian terraces, which make up the majority of homes in Leyton

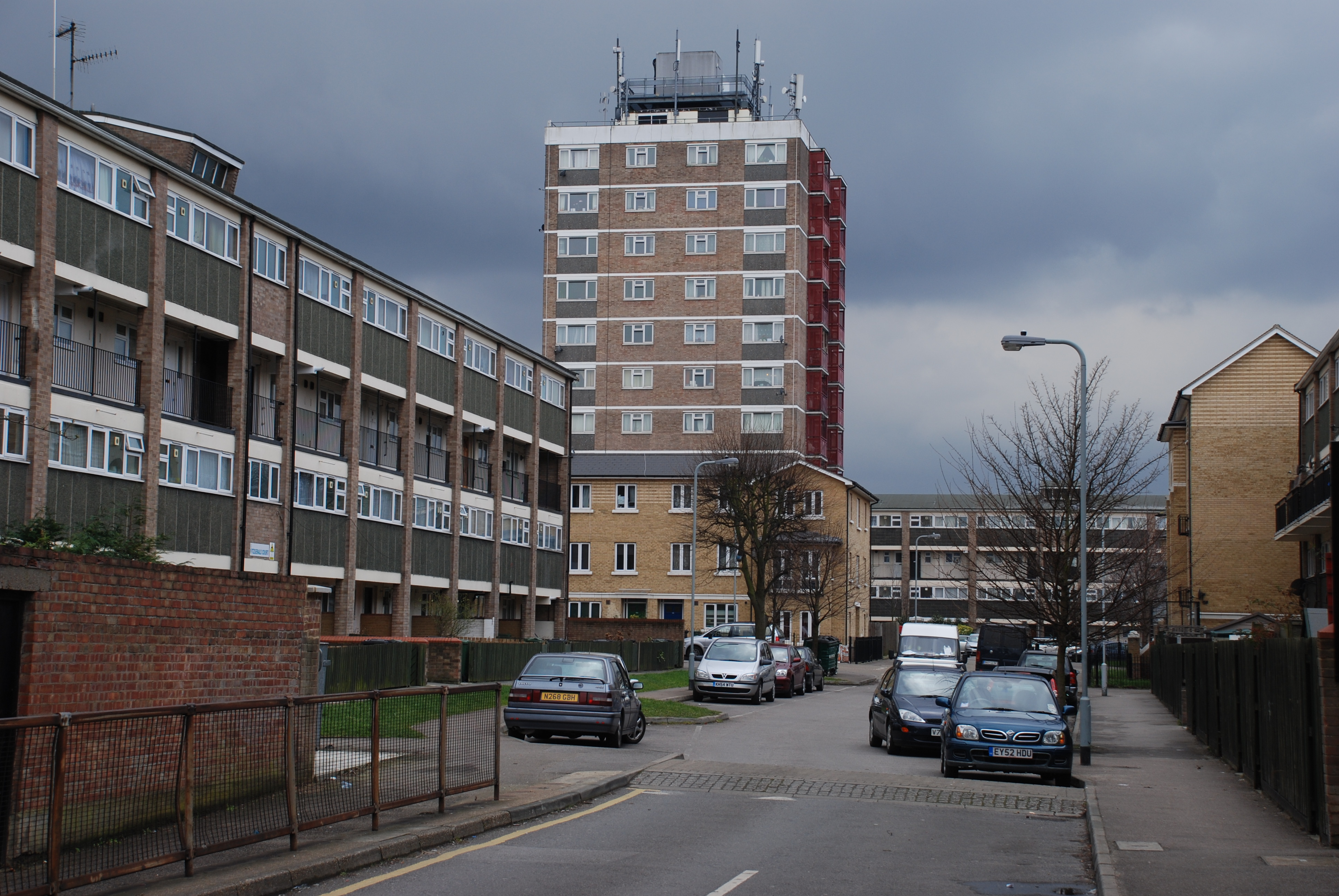
The Leyton Grange estate, one of the few 1960s-built estates left in Leyton

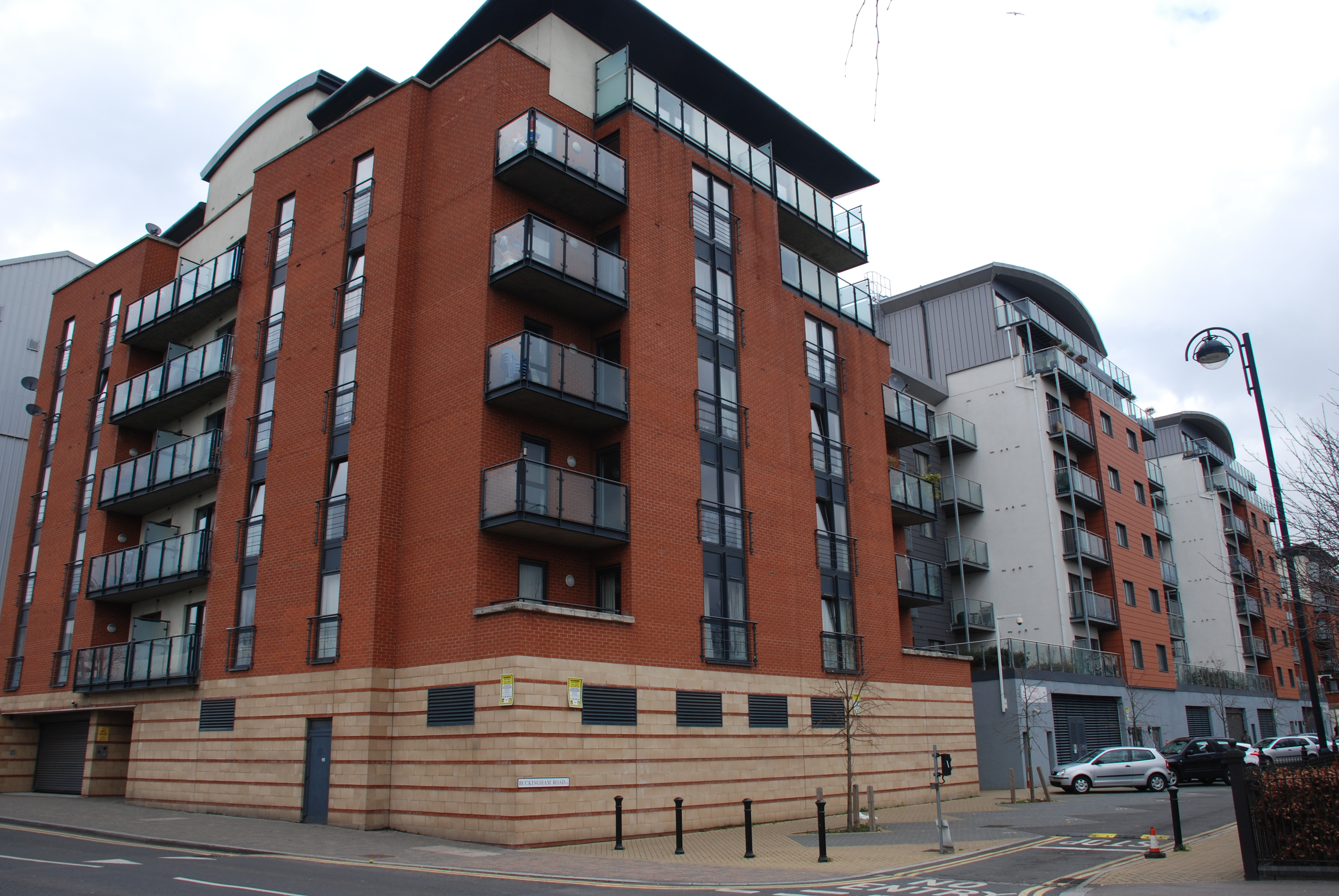
Modern flats built at Brisbane Road stadium

The majority of homes in the area consists of Victorian and Edwardian terraces built between 1870 and 1910 during Leyton's phase of rapid development from what had been a small village at the beginning of the 1800s. These properties range in size from two- to seven-bedroom houses. As a result, the area is popular with families.

Large-scale redevelopment and inner city regeneration has been underway in Leyton for many years, as is also the case in the neighbouring areas of Hackney, Bow, Clapton and Stratford. Leyton's skyline is comparatively low-rise compared to other districts of east London. High-rise estates once dominated the horizon, but the towers were unpopular with many residents and considered to be poorly constructed. The Oliver Close and Cathall Road estates were the first to be completely redeveloped by demolition and rebuilding with the help of the multimillion-pound Waltham Forest Housing Action Trust scheme during the early 2000s. The redevelopment of the problematic Avenue Road Estate followed.

Demolition of the last large high-rise estate in the area, the Beaumont Road Estate, began in 2006. It has since been almost completely redeveloped. The only remaining 20-storey tower block left in Waltham Forest – from a 1970s peak of 20 across the borough – is the Northwood Tower in Walthamstow. However, smaller 1960s-built blocks, such the 10-storey Slade Tower in the Leyton Grange estate, still dot the area. A host of modern apartment buildings have also been built since the late 1990s, including the flats built at each end of Leyton Orient Football Club's Brisbane Road stadium. There is now further development taking place opposite Coronation Gardens and the Stadium with 750 new homes set to be built by 2027, known as The Score Centre.

== Sports ==
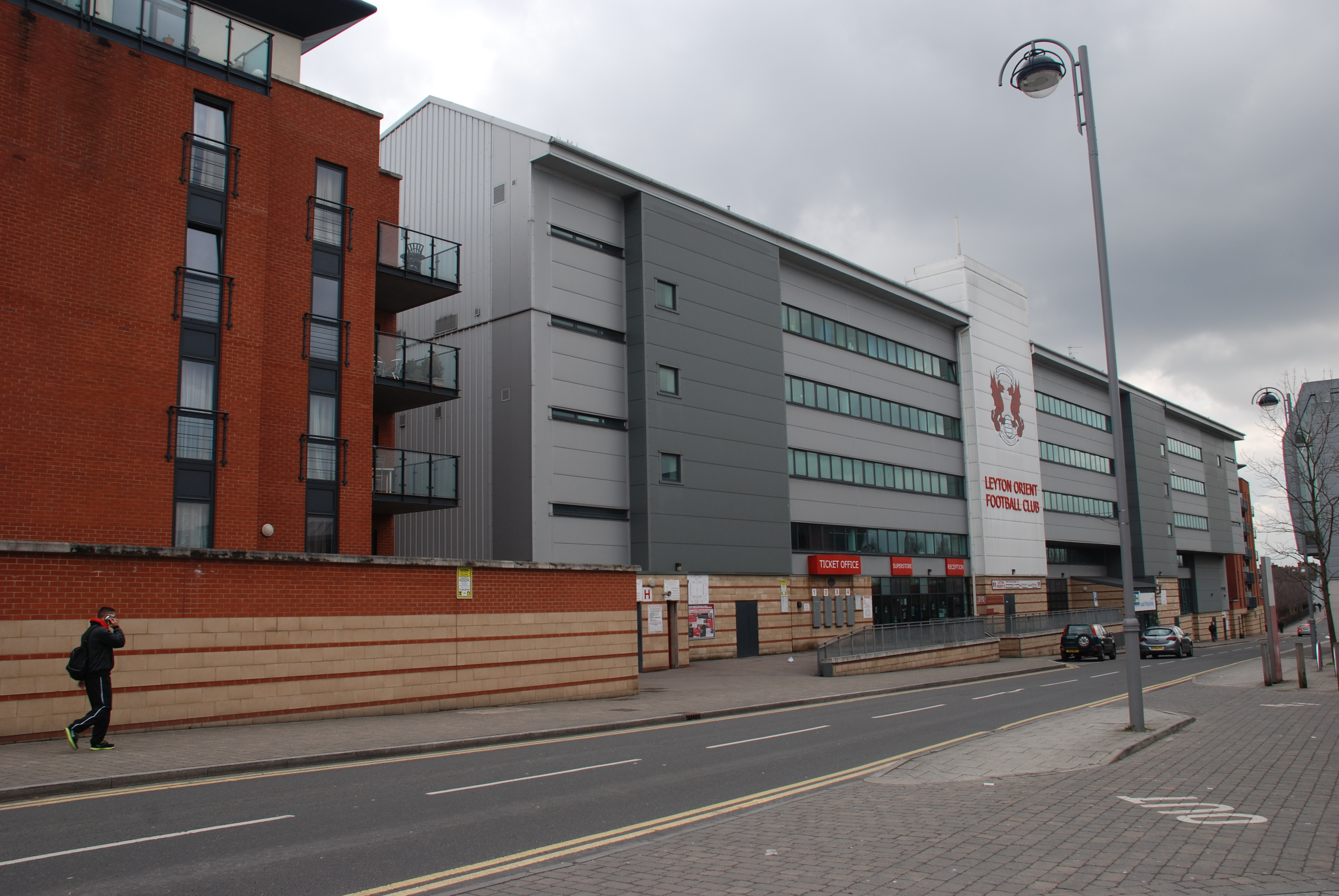
Brisbane Road stadium, the home of Leyton Orient Football Club

The town is the home to the football club, Leyton Orient F.C., viewed by many residents as one of the most important parts of Leyton's identity. Orient came to Brisbane Road, Leyton in 1936 from Clapton. The stadium has over time been re-constructed and changed its name from Leyton Stadium to the Matchroom Stadium and is now the Gaughan Group Stadium. Although they reached the top flight of English football when promoted to the Football League First Division in 1962, Orient currently play in League One.

Leyton Orient's future in the heart of Leyton is uncertain. In October 2011, Orient submitted a request to the Football League to move into and become tenants of the London 2012 Olympic Stadium, following complaints over West Ham United being given a 99-year lease of the stadium. Orient said that the stadium was too close to their stadium, which they said would breach FA rules. There has also been talk of the club moving into the 15,000 seater Riverbank Arena.

Leyton F.C. (between 1975 and 1992 called "Leyton Wingate") was founded in 1868, and until January 2011 played in the Isthmian League Division One North at the Leyton Stadium in Lea Bridge Road. Leyton FC amalgamated with Walthamstow Pennant FC, in 1995 and renamed as Leyton Pennant FC. In 1994, they changed their name again to Waltham Forest FC.

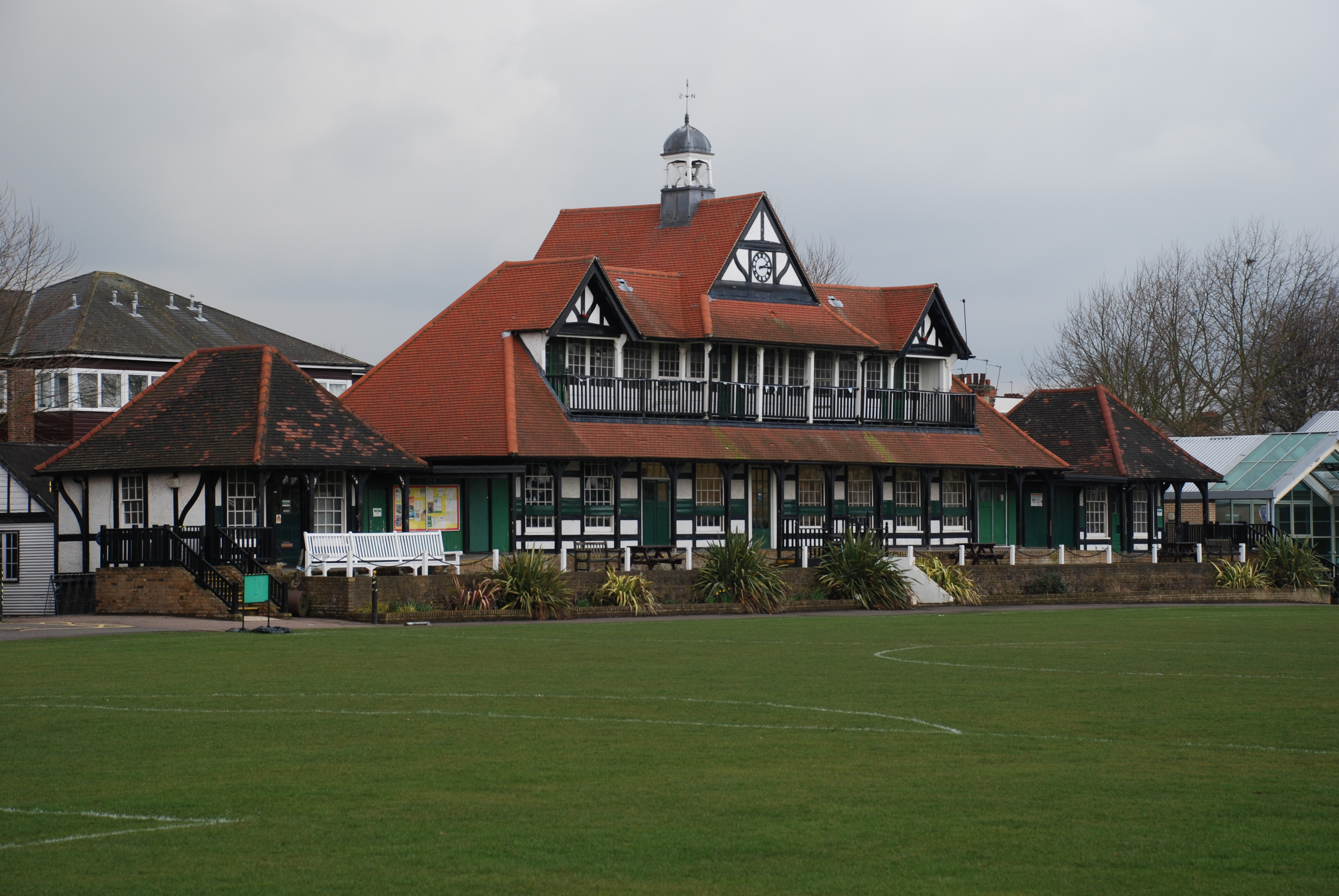
Leyton Cricket Ground. Built in 1886, it was the headquarters of Essex County Cricket Club until 1933.

Leyton also has a cricket pitch and pavilion, which was the former home of Essex County Cricket Club. In 1886, the club purchased Leyton Cricket Ground in the High Road, which became their headquarters until 1933; however, they continued to play at Leyton until 1977. The pavilion (a Grade II listed building) still stands today as part of Leyton Youth Centre.

Wapping Hockey Club and East London Hockey Club are field hockey clubs that both play at the Lee Valley Hockey and Tennis Centre, and compete in the Women's England Hockey League and the London Hockey League.

The Lee Valley Ice Centre is home to the Lea Valley Lions Ice Hockey Club who play in the English National Ice Hockey League.

Leyton borders the Olympic Park for the 2012 Olympic Games. The training facilities at the Waltham Forest Pool & Track were used by Olympians to prepare for the Games.

Also in Leyton is the Lee Valley VeloPark, which has a 6,000-seat indoor velodrome for track cycling and a 6,000-seat outdoor BMX racing track. The Lee Valley Tennis and Hockey centres at Eton Manor were also due to open to the public in late 2013.

== Education ==
Leyton has a number of secondary schools, including George Mitchell School, Lammas School and Norlington School. There is also a college, Leyton Sixth Form College, which is the second sixth form college in Southern England to get a licence, and the best college in London for sport.

A class in Riverley Primary School in Leyton won the 'funniest joke' competition run by The Beano in 2025 and the school's Maisha Mahfuza won the 'funniest teacher' accolade.

== Transport ==
Leyton is on the Central line of London Underground, with the station located at the southern end of the High Road. There is a London Overground station at Midland Road on the Gospel Oak to Barking line.

Leyton is served by a number of London bus routes day and night.

Central London may be reached by bicycle from Lea Bridge Road following the London Cycle Network Route 9 through Hackney and Shoreditch.

== Notable people ==
- Benik Afobe (born 1993) – Football player
- Peter Ashby – New wave musician and composer, born in Leyton 1963
- Joseph Gurney Barclay (1816–1898) – head of Barclays Bank and astronomer whose observatory was at Knotts Green House
- Harry Beck (1902–1974) – Creator of the London Underground Map
- William Bowyer (1699–1777) – Printer, buried in Leyton Parish Church
- Leyton Buzzards – Punk rock band of the late 1970s
- Jack Cornwell – Born in Leyton in 1900, killed at the Battle of Jutland in 1916, recipient of the Victoria Cross
- William Cotton (1786–1866) – Banker, Governor of the Bank of England 1842–1845
- Bobby Crush (born 1954) – Pop pianist and actor
- Iron Maiden (1975) – Heavy metal band
- Hugo Dewar (1908–1981) – Trotskyist activist
- Curtis Davies (born 1985) – Football player
- Charles Goring, 2nd Earl of Norwich (1615–1671) – Soldier and aristocrat, lived at Forest House and buried in Leyton Parish Church
- Sir Gilbert Heathcote (1652–1733) – Governor of the Bank of England and Lord Mayor of London
- Gunshot – British hip hop group
- Sir Michael Hicks (1543–1612) – Courtier and politician, lord of the manor of Ruckholt
- Sir James Houblon (1629–1700) – Merchant and Member of Parliament (MP), lived at Forest House
- David Lewis (1682–1760) – Poet, buried in Leyton Parish Church
- John Lill – Musician (b.1944). Winner of International Tchaikovsky Competition 1970.
- Thomas Lodge (1558–1625) – author, poet and playwright
- George Mitchell (1911–1944) – Soldier, killed in the Italian Campaign (World War II), recipient of the Victoria Cross
- Frank Muir (1920–1998) – Writer, television and radio personality
- John Henry Pepper (1821–1900) – Scientist and inventor, creator of Pepper's ghost, a famous stage illusion
- Sir Thomas Roe – English diplomat, born in Leyton in 1581
- John Strype (1643–1737) – Historian and biographer, was curate and vicar of Leyton 1669–1737
- Cardinal Nicholas Wiseman (1802–1865) – The first Archbishop of Westminster, lived at Etloe House, Leyton, 1858–1864

== Sports clubs ==
- Leyton Football Club
- Leyton Orient Football Club
- Lee Valley Lions
