= Housing action trust =

Defunct public bodies in England

Housing action trusts (HAT) were non-departmental public bodies, set up to redevelop some of the poorest council housing estates in England's inner-city suburbs.

Six housing action trusts were established under the Housing Act 1988. Each HAT was administered by a board appointed by the Deputy Prime Minister. They were required to award construction works contracts in accordance with public sector procurement laws.

The six housing action trusts were as follows:

- North Hull HAT was the first to wind up, in 1999.
- Liverpool HAT demolished 54 high-rise blocks, built new homes on the land, and refurbished 13 other tower blocks. It was wound up in 2005.
- Stonebridge HAT in Harlesden, Brent, north-west London, was the last to shut down in 2007.
- Waltham Forest HAT, covering Cathall Road estate in Leytonstone, Oliver Close estate in Leyton, Boundary Road estate in Walthamstow and Chingford Hall Estate in Chingford. Waltham Forest HAT transferred its redeveloped estates to Community-based Housing Association and shut down in April 2002. English Partnerships then demolished four empty tower blocks.
- Tower Hamlets HAT in east London, covering Montieth, Tredegar and Lefevre Walk estates in Bow. Replacement housing is owned by successor body Old Ford Housing Association.
- Castle Vale HAT in Birmingham demolished 32 tower blocks on one of Britain's largest estates. Castle Vale HAT shut down in March 2005.

HATs were intended to have a short lifespan. After completing regeneration of their estates, the HATs transferred ownership of the tenanted housing estates to other social landlords, in some cases setting up local housing associations which later formed group structures with other associations. All the HATs' residuary assets and undertakings then passed to English Partnerships.
