= Leddra Chapman =

- Born: Anna Leddra Chapman; 10 October 1989 (age 37); Brentwood, England
- Occupations: Singer-songwriter; musician
- Instruments: Vocals; guitar; piano
- Years active: 2009–present
- Labels: ALC Records, Dramatico Deutschland
- Albums: Telling Tales

Leddra Chapman (born Anna Leddra Chapman, 10 October 1989) is an English singer-songwriter and musician from Brentwood in Essex. She rose to prominence when her debut single, "Story", was released on 7 December 2009 to much critical success and strong radio support and play from Terry Wogan on BBC Radio 2 during his last weeks as host of the station's breakfast show. The track is taken from her debut album, Telling Tales, which was produced by Peter-John Vettese and released for download on 29 November 2009. She was a student at London College of Music and she is also an ambassador for clothing company Quiksilver and The Body Shop. Her single 'All About You', from her second EP 'The Crowds and Cocktails', was BBC Radio 2's single of the week on 4 March 2013 and later added to the radio's B List.

Chapman has been interviewed by industry intelligence magazine, Five Eight, and mentioned by Music Ally. She is best known for her high, soprano voice. Music Week magazine have described her as "filling a similar space to early Alanis Morissette and Joni Mitchell".

== Music career ==
=== Career beginnings ===
At the age of 12, Chapman began learning the guitar and began writing songs and continued writing until she had enough songs to play live at local venues. She soon began touring nationally and taught herself to play piano and produce her own demos at her home studio. This resulted in an invitation to play at Manchester's in the City Music Conference.

=== 2009–2012: Telling Tales ===
In 2009 Chapman began work on completing her debut album 'Telling Tales' with musical collaborators such as Peter-John Vettese, releasing the record in late November 2009. Praised by critics, with The Independent labelling the album as 'pitch-perfect acoustic pop', the album's lead single 'Story' saw much radio support, especially from Sir Terry Wogan during his final weeks presenting the BBC Radio 2 Breakfast Show. "Story" was subsequently B-Listed on Radio 2 for seven consecutive weeks. This culminated in a televised live performance of the song on ITV's This Morning. The follow-up single "Summer Song" was also playlisted by BBC Radio 2. Chapman and her live band followed this up with a two-month UK tour that included sell-out shows in London. "Edie" and "A Little Easier" were also released as singles.

==== 2011: A Trick or Two ====
After promotion for 'Telling Tales' finished, Chapman began work on her second album which was expected for release in late 2011. However, instead Chapman released her first EP, titled 'A Trick or Two' on 20 November 2011. The EP charted at number 72 in the UK and comprises 4 tracks, and the deluxe edition features an additional track. The EP saw Chapman venture into Hip-Hop and Breakbeat.

===== Track listing =====
1. Where You Want Me – 3:36
2. Guilty – 3:15
3. Any Questions? – 3:47
4. Let Me Fall – 3:30
5. Heartbeat (Live) – 4:03^

^Only available on deluxe edition of the EP.

==== 2012: Signing to 'Dramatico Deutschland' ====
In late 2012 Chapman was signed to 'Dramatico Deutschland' (sometimes known as 'Dramatico') to see 'Telling Tales' and other works released in countries such as Germany, Austria and Switzerland.

=== 2013:Body Shop Ambassador & Teenage Cancer Trust Official Charity Single & "Crowds & Cocktails EP" ===
Chapman worked on her second studio album alongside premièring the song 'Lioness' which is available for free download. Chapman released 'Beauty With Heart' as a single on 8 January with The Body Shop as a charity release for Teenage Cancer Trust.

In an interview in early 2013 Chapman said: "...I’ve written dozens (and dozens!) of songs since Telling Tales, and I can’t wait to share them with you. Some you will have heard at gigs and online – they may even be more familiar than the Telling Tales songs now.

==== The Crowds and Cocktails ====
Chapman announced on 23 January 2013 that she would be releasing a new EP called 'The Crowds and Cocktails'. The EP was released on 18 February 2013 and has five tracks. The EP saw Chapman return to a similar style reminiscent of 'Telling Tales' and saw the release of single 'All About You', which premiered on BBC Radio 2 on 26 January 2013 on The Graham Norton Show. The EP is available for digital download on iTunes; however, it was available as a physical CD exclusively at her 2013 winter tour. The single, 'All About You', was BBC Radio 2's single of the week on the week ending 10 March 2013 and later added to the radio's B list. The song has so far peaked at number 41 on the UK Airplay Chart

===== Track listing =====
1. All About You – 3:15
2. Supermarket – 2:52
3. Tongue Tied – 2:46
4. Woman – 4:21
5. Fallen From Grace (Live Bonus Track) – 3:57

==== 2014-2015: Fidelity and Grace ====
It was announced that the album would be released through PledgeMusic under the title "My Mother's Mind" (which later became "Fidelity and Grace") in spring 2014, and the official version was released later that year, preceding the release of 'Playground' as the second single, after 'All About You'. Leddra guest appeared on "Weekend Wogan" where she joined Terry Wogan for his prestigious radio show for an interview and live performance.

2016: The Third Love EP

2019: Sad Songs for Christmas EP

2021: Jazz Cafe Show (Sold Out) celebrating the 10th anniversary of "Telling Tales" (delayed due to Covid)

==== 2023–2024: Telling Truths ====
In autumn 2023, Chapman announced that she had completed writing a new studio album, Telling Truths, and would fund its production through a crowdfunding campaign. She recorded the album during 2024 and released it in October 2024 through ALC Music Ltd.

===== Track listing =====
The track listing is taken from Discogs.

1. Prelude
2. What If I
3. Paint Your Hometown
4. Type Of Monster
5. Inside Out
6. 2 Years Of Sleep
7. Minute More
8. Worthy
9. Honest
10. Save Myself
11. Aftermath

=== Collaborations ===
She has collaborated many times with singer/songwriter Ed Sheeran on covers such as Cee Lo Green's "F* k You". This cover was recorded in the South of France on a songwriting trip which saw Sheeran and Chapman collaborate on the track "Someone Better Than You" which was premiered on the Quiksilver YouTube channel.

Leddra was also the backing vocalist on Sheeran's EP Songs I Wrote with Amy and has also performed one of the EP's songs "Fall" with him on his EP Live at the Bedford.

Leddra has also collaborated with Alistair Griffin on BBC Radio 2 playlisted single "The One", which also featured a live performance on This Morning, accompanied by The Grimethorpe Colliery Band.

== Discography ==
Leddra Chapman discography
- Studio albums: 3
- Extended plays: 4
- Singles: 7

=== Albums ===
Album Title	Album details	Peak chart positions
Album Title	Album details	UK
Telling Tales	Format: Physical CD, Digital download; Released: 29 November 2009; Label: ALC Music Limited, Dramatico Deutschland	–
Fidelity & Grace	Format: Physical CD, Digital download; Released: 2014; Label: ALC Music Limited	–
Telling Tales (Live in London)	Format: Physical CD, Digital download; Released: 2023; Label: ALC Music Limited	–
Telling Truths	Format: Physical CD, Digital download; Released: 2024; Label: ALC Music Limited	-

=== EPs ===
Album title	Album details	Peak chart positions
Album title	Album details	UK
A Trick or Two	Released: 20 November 2011; Label: ALC Music Limited; Format: Digital download	72
The Crowds and Cocktails	Released: 18 February 2013; Label: ALC Music Limited; Format: Physical CD, Digital download	–
The Third Love	Released: 2016; Label: ALC Music Limited; Format: Physical CD, Digital download	–
Sad Songs for Christmas	Released: 2019; Label: ALC Music Limited; Format: Physical CD, Digital download	–

=== Singles ===
Year	Single Title	Peak chart positions	Album
Year	Single Title	UK	Album
2009	Story	184	Telling Tales
2010	A Little Easier	–	Telling Tales
2010	Summer Song	–	Telling Tales
2010	Edie	–	Telling Tales
2013	Beauty With Heart	–	Charity single
2013	All About You	–	The Crowds and Cocktails
2014	Playground	–	My Mother's Mind

==== As featured artist ====
Single title	Peak chart positions
Single title	UK
"Tables Turn" (Redzz featuring Leddra Chapman)	–
"Enemy Lines" (Olly B featuring Leddra Chapman)	–
"The One" (Alistair Griffin featuring Leddra Chapman)	–
