= Telling Tales (album) =

Studio album by Leddra Chapman
- Released: 29 November 2009
- Recorded: 2009 at Area 21 Studios, London
- Genre: Singer-Songwriter
- Length: 38:24
- Label: ALC Records, Dramatico Deutschland
- Producer: Peter-John Vettese

Leddra Chapman chronology
Telling Tales (2009)	A Trick or Two (2011)

Singles from Telling Tales
- 1. "Story" Released: 7 December 2009; 2. "A Little Easier" Released: 15 March 2010; 3. "Summer Song" Released: 27 June 2010; 4. "Edie" Released: 12 December 2010

Telling Tales is the debut album of English singer-songwriter Leddra Chapman. The album was released in the United Kingdom on 29 November 2009 to much critical success. The album yielded lead single, "Story", which saw much radio support and was championed by Sir Terry Wogan during his final weeks presenting the breakfast show at BBC Radio 2. In 2011, Chapman went on her debut tour of the UK in support of the album where several shows were reported sell-outs.

== Reception ==
Telling Tales received critical acclaim from critics, with Lauren John saying "Telling Tales is packed full of emotive vocals, catchy beats, and well crafted instrumentation, which in terms of quality, equals that of releases by more established acts"; OK Magazine gave the album a rating of 5/5 and said "Story and Saving You are gorgeously exhilarating, Edie and Wine Glass are sweetly pretty, while Fooling Myself and Wrap Me Up will break your heart". Northern Sky also gave the album a positive review. Q Magazine Online stated that the Chapman was “Undoubtedly a terrific songwriter who deserves a bigger audience” whilst writing a review for the album.

== Singles ==
- "Story" serves as the lead single from the album, being released on the 7 December 2009. The single peaked at number 184 on the UK Official Top 200 and is her most successful single to date, and, to add to this, the accompanying music video has received over 50,000 views. The song was added to the BBC Radio 2 B-list for seven consecutive weeks. 'Story' was performed on BBC Radio 2, Chapman stated that the song was about her friend Marisa Jones.
- "A Little Easier" was released as the album's second single on 15 March 2010. The music video released accumulated over 100,000 views on YouTube.
- "Summer Song" was the third single and released on 27 June 2010. The single was played on Radio 2 several times but failed to chart in the UK top 200. However, the music video for the song has been watched more than 200,000 times and serves as Chapman's most watched single on YouTube. The song was released in an EP format, with a new version of the song being made, with more pop elements.
- "Edie" serves as the album's fourth and final single to be released on 12 December 2010. Like 'Summer Song', the song was released in an EP format with a new version of the song being made, with more pop elements.

== Track listing ==
No.	Title	Writer(s)	Length
1.	"Story"	Leddra Chapman	3:09
2.	"A Little Easier"		3:07
3.	"Edie"	Leddra Chapman	3:39
4.	"Summer Song"		3:22
5.	"Picking Oranges"	Leddra Chapman	4:01
6.	"Saving You"		3:26
7.	"WineGlass"		4;12
8.	"Jocelin"		3;12
9.	"Fooling Myself"		3:10
10.	"Wrap Me Up"	Leddra Chapman	3:24

Bonus Track
No.	Title	Length
11.	"Easy Way To Fall"	4:22

== Personnel ==
Credits taken from the album's liner notes

- Leddra Chapman – vocals and guitar
- Peter-John Vettese – guitar, producer and all additional instruments
- Violin – Jade Brightwell
- The Egham Brass Band – Brass
- Jon Harris – Cajon
- Mark 'Tufty' Evans – guitar, mixed the album
- Dario Cortese – guitar
