= Municipal Borough of Leyton =

Former local government area in the UK

Coordinates: 51°33′28″N 0°0′6″E

Leyton
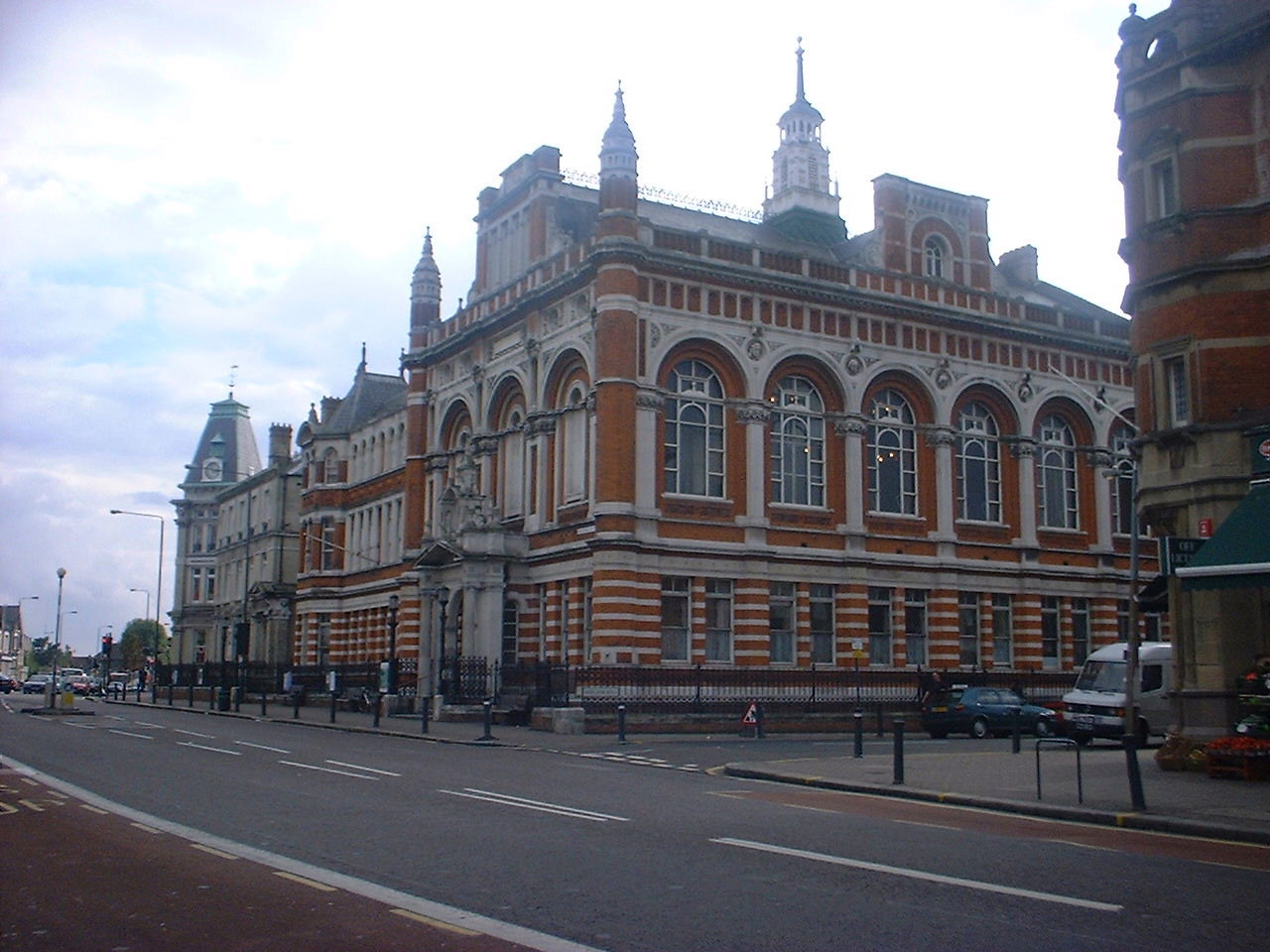
- Leyton Town Hall

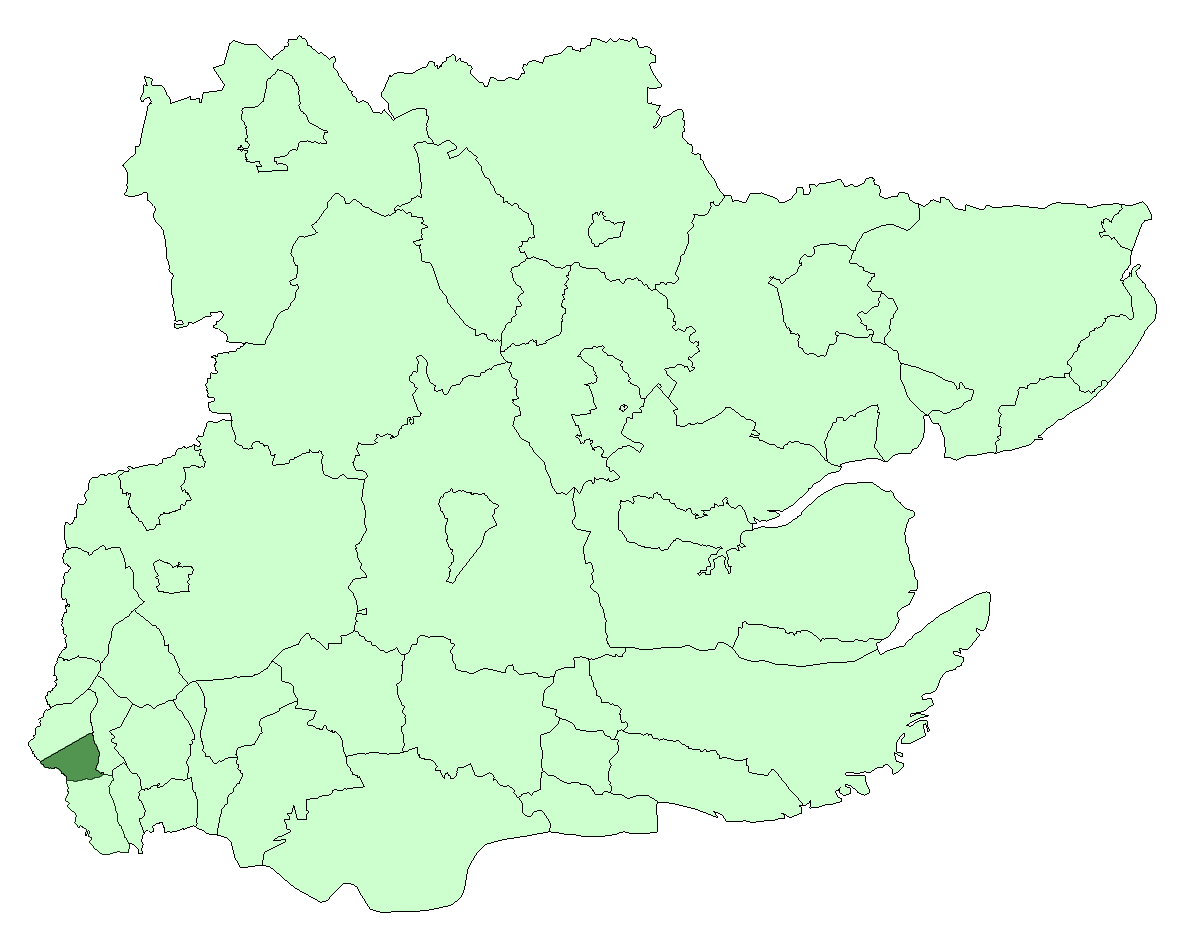
- Leyton within Essex in 1961
- Area
  - 1901: 2,594 acres (10.5 km^{2})
  - 1931: 2,594 acres (10.5 km^{2})
  - 1961: 2,595 acres (10.5 km^{2})
- Population
  - 1901: 98,912
  - 1931: 128,313
  - 1961: 93,959
- Density
  - 1901: 38.1/acre
  - 1931: 49.5/acre
  - 1961: 36.2/acre
- History
  - Origin: Leyton St Mary ancient parish
  - Created: 1873
  - Abolished: 1965
  - Succeeded by: London Borough of Waltham Forest
- Status: Local government district (1873–1894); Urban district (1894–1926); Municipal borough (1926–1965)
- Government: Leyton Local Board (1873–1894); Leyton Urban District Council (1894–1926); Leyton Borough Council (1926–1965)
  - HQ: High Road, Leyton
  - Motto: MINISTRANDO DIGNITAS (Dignity in service)
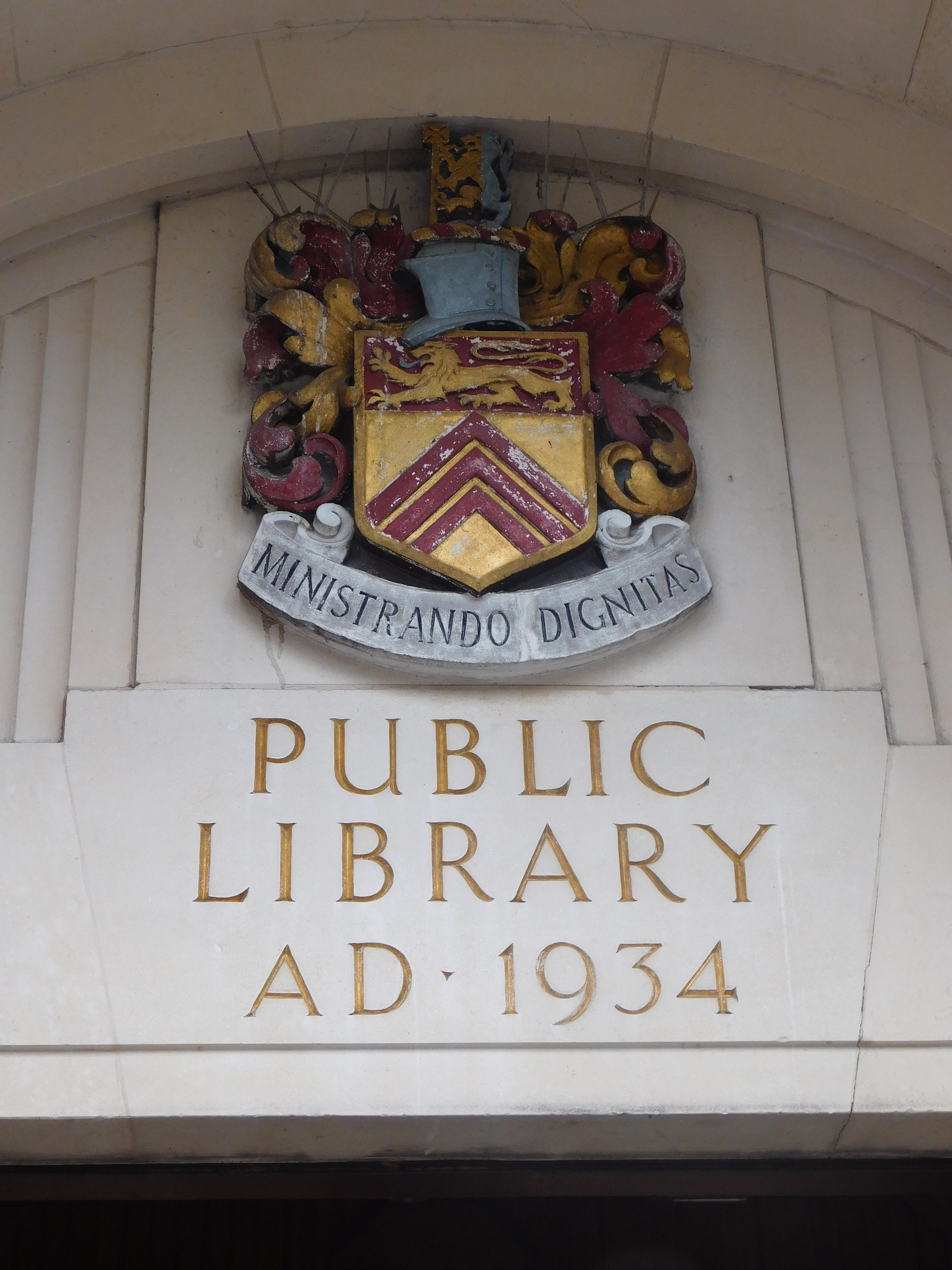
- Leyton's coat of arms outside Leytonstone Library
- Subdivisions
  - Type: Civil parishes
  - Units: Leyton (1873–1965); Walthamstow (part) (1873–1878); Wanstead (part) (1875–1894); Cann Hall (1894–1965)

Leyton was a local government district in southwest Essex, England, from 1873 to 1965. It included the neighbourhoods of Leyton, Leytonstone and Cann Hall. It was suburban to London, forming part of the London postal district and Metropolitan Police District. It now forms the southernmost part of the London Borough of Waltham Forest in Greater London.

== Background ==
Leyton, also known as Leyton St Mary or Low Leyton, was an ancient parish in the Becontree hundred of Essex, England. Originally, the parish had an area of 2,271 acres (919 hectares), which included a detached part to the north of 588 acres (238 hectares), separated from the main part of the parish by a long, narrow exclave of Walthamstow, known as the Walthamstow Slip. To the south, the parish of Wanstead formed a long protrusion known as the Wanstead Slip, which extended to the marshes of the River Lea and divided Leyton from West Ham.

Much of the early governance of the parish was in the hands of the lords of the manors of Leyton and Ruckholt, who held courts baron, a type of manorial court from the medieval period until the 1840s. The lords and their courts appointed public officers such as constables (from 1381), marsh haywards, ale tasters (from 1509), headboroughs (from 1578), tithingmen (from 1584) and a poundkeeper in 1796. They also decided rights of common, who was liable for maintaining roads and bridges, and for making and maintaining infrastructure such as animal pounds, lock ups and stocks.

== The vestry ==
From the 17th century, the local government of Leyton was increasingly controlled by the parish vestry, particularly with regard to the administration of the Poor Laws and levying of the parish rates. Initially only meeting once a year at Easter to elect and appoint parish officers, a second meeting each year was necessary by 1681, a third meeting from 1698 and monthly from 1759. Although the main Easter meeting was held in the parish church vestry room, other meetings were held in pubs or coffee houses, the committee members being entitled to a generous entertainment allowance of 40 shillings twice a year, although this was halved in 1723. Originally the meetings were presided over by the lord of the manor of Ruckholt, until 1695 when the Vicar of Leyton took on that role. A parish clerk is first mentioned in 1623.

The parish appointed a parish beadle from 1718 and two overseers of the poor by 1721, one for Leyton and one for Leytonstone. The parish of Leyton endowed eight alms houses in Church Road and in 1742, built a work house immediately behind them. The work house was closed in 1836, Leyton having joined, along with neighbouring parishes, the West Ham Poor Law Union. The Union built a new work house in Leyton to serve the whole area in 1839–41, the building eventually becoming Langthorne Hospital. A workhouse infirmary built at Whipps Cross in 1900-03 later became Whipps Cross Hospital.

There were two constables, one for Leyton and one for Leytonstone; both were appointed by the vestry from 1733. There was a whipping post at Leyton, replaced by a new one in 1756 when the stocks were also replaced, There was also a watch house and "cage" or lock-up. Leytonstone also had stocks and a watch house; a cage was built at Harrow Green in 1812. The parish of Leyton was incorporated into the Metropolitan Police District in 1840.

== Local Government District ==
Through house building and construction of the railway the parish expanded as an extra-metropolitan suburb of London. The parish authorities resisted earlier attempts to form a local board of health. A local government district was eventually created in 1873, administered by an elected local board. The district covered the parish of Leyton or Low Leyton and the Walthamstow Slip. The order creating the district called it "Low Leyton", but by 1875 the district was being called just "Leyton" in official documents. The district was extended to include part of the parish of Wanstead to the south, known as Wanstead Slip or Cann Hall, from 1875. The Walthamstow Slip was transferred to the parish of Low Leyton in 1878.

The board of the new district met in the vestry room until 1882, when new public offices were built in Leyton High Road to the design of J Knight.

== Urban district ==
Local government districts such as Leyton were reconstituted as urban districts under the Local Government Act 1894. The 1894 act did not allow parishes to be split between districts, so the portion of Wanstead in the district was made a new parish called Cann Hall. The Leyton urban district therefore covered the two parishes of Cann Hall and Leyton or Low Leyton. The ambiguity in the name of the latter parish was resolved in 1921, when its name was confirmed as just being Leyton. Initially there were four wards in the district, but in 1903 it was reorganised into nine wards and then ten in 1920.

A town hall was built for the urban district in 1895-96 next to the 1882 offices, which had proved to be too small and were converted into a public library. Designed by John Johnson (died 1920), Leyton Town Hall was described by Nikolaus Pevsner as "Fussy but enjoyable, in an eclectic and enriched Italianate style".

Amongst the infrastructure improvements initiated by the board was the Leyton Urban District Council Tramways; tram services in Leyton remained in local government control until they became the responsibility of the London Passenger Transport Board in 1933.

== Municipal Borough ==
After a formal petition to the Privy Council in 1920, the urban district was incorporated as a municipal borough in 1926. Each of the existing ten wards was represented by one alderman and three councillors. The first mayor of the new borough was James Benjamin Slade, who was knighted in 1927.

=== Borough arms ===
The coat of arms of the municipal borough were granted on 27 November 1926. The arms were described as "Or three Chevronels Gules on a Chief Gules a Lion passant Or". The crest was: "On a Wreath Or and Gules a Lion rampant per pale Or and Sable supporting a Crozier Gold". The Latin language motto was "MINISTRANDO DIGNITAS" meaning "dignity in service". Elements of the arms commemorated various families who had held manors within the borough during the Middle Ages, and also the nearby Stratford Langthorne Abbey which had held lands in Leyton before the Dissolution of the Monasteries. The lion and cross-staff on the crest of the Leyton arms have been preserved in the arms of the London Borough of Waltham Forest, which were granted on 1 January 1965.

== Abolition ==
In 1965 the municipal borough was abolished by the London Government Act 1963 and its former area transferred to Greater London from Essex. Its former area was combined with that of the Municipal Borough of Chingford and the Municipal Borough of Walthamstow to form the present-day London Borough of Waltham Forest. The last Mayor of Leyton was Terence Charles Messenger.
