= Cathall =

Housing estate in Leytonstone, London

Coordinates: 51.5588°N 0.0055°E

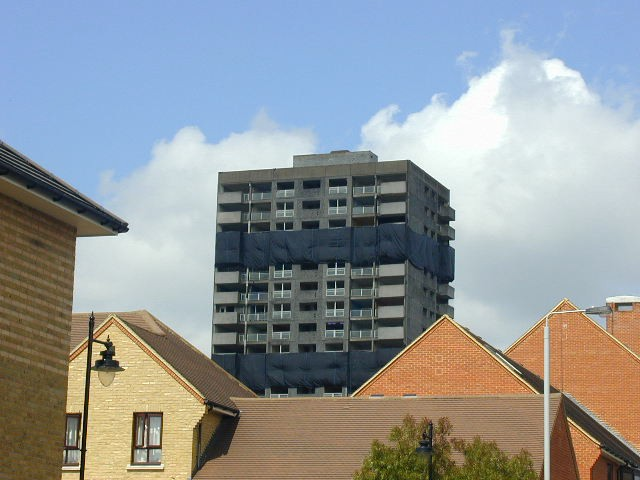
The since-demolished Hornbeam Tower, in 2002

Cathall is a housing estate in the Cathall ward, Leytonstone, East London. It is currently managed by Community-based Housing Association.

== History ==
Cathall estate was built in 1972, consisting of two 20-storey tower blocks, Hornbeam Tower and Redwood Tower, and a network of 8-storey flats. It became one of Britain's poorest areas with extreme levels of poverty and crime. Cathall estate and the surrounding area of Leytonstone has often been known to have a large gang culture.

In the late 1990s, the estate began to be regenerated into a low-rise housing estate by the Waltham Forest Housing Action Trust and its successor landlord, Community-based Housing Association. Similar Housing Action Trust schemes were set up across Waltham Forest and Tower Hamlets in East London, Brent in North West London, Liverpool, Hull and Birmingham.

Despite widespread opposition, it was announced in 2015 that the Community-Based Housing Association would be taken over by the Peabody Trust. Peabody controversially 'sacked the board' in July 2015 for rejecting their takeover plans. The board included residents of the Cathall estate. Peabody later placed their own officers on the board.

Following the removal of the tower blocks, Cathall's most prominent feature is now its leisure centre.
