= Chingford and Woodford Green =

UK Parliament constituency (since 1997)

Coordinates: 51.617°N 0.003°E

- Borough constituency for the House of Commons
- Interactive map of boundaries from 2024
- Boundary within Greater London
- County: Greater London
- Population: 110,200 (2022)
- Electorate: 75,677 (March 2020)

Current constituency
- Created: 1997
- Member of Parliament: Iain Duncan Smith (Conservative)
- Seats: One
- Created from: Chingford and Wanstead & Woodford

Chingford and Woodford Green is a constituency in North East London represented in the House of Commons of the UK Parliament by Iain Duncan Smith of the Conservative Party since its creation in 1997. (Note: As with all constituencies, the constituency elects one Member of Parliament (MP) by the first-past-the-post system of election at least every five years.)

== Constituency profile ==
Chingford and Woodford Green is a suburban constituency located on the outskirts of Greater London, covering parts of the boroughs of Waltham Forest and Redbridge. It includes the neighbourhoods of Chingford, Woodford and Highams Park. Like much of suburban London, the area was rural until the arrival of rail transport in the 19th century, which grew the area into a commuter suburb. The constituency is mostly affluent, particularly in the neighbourhoods of Woodford Green and Monkhams. House prices are higher than the national average and residents have high levels of homeownership compared to the rest of London.

Residents have high income and average levels of education and professional employment compared with the rest of the country. The area is ethnically diverse; roughly half the population are White British with 12% identifying as Other White. Asians make up 15% of residents and Black people are 11%. At the local borough council level, most of the constituency is represented by Conservatives, although some Labour Party councillors were elected in Woodford Bridge and South Chingford. Voters in the constituency were evenly split on leaving or remaining in the European Union in the 2016 referendum, with an estimated 50% voting for each option.

== History ==
=== Pre creation ===
Before 1945, both Chingford and Woodford were part of the Epping parliamentary constituency, for which wartime Conservative Prime Minister Winston Churchill was MP. The Chingford and Woodford Green constituency was created in 1997 from parts of the former seats of Chingford and Wanstead and Woodford. Both seats previously had well-known MPs, Norman Tebbit and Winston Churchill respectively. Iain Duncan Smith had been MP for Chingford since 1992, then was elected MP for this constituency five years later in 1997.

=== Post creation ===
At the seat's inauguration at the 1997 general election, there was a Conservative majority of over 5000 or 13%; the Conservatives retained the seat in 2001 with a majority little changed on a low turnout. In 2005, the Conservative incumbent did better, getting twice as many votes as Labour with a swing to the party of 6.4% (over double that nationally) from Labour.

The 2015 result gave the seat the 119th most marginal majority of the Conservative Party's 331 seats by percentage of majority.

At the 2017 snap election, Duncan Smith was re-elected with a greatly reduced majority on a 7% swing to Labour, slightly more than a sixth of his 2010 margin.

The 2019 general election saw the Conservatives retaining the seat, although with a smaller majority than 2017 due to a swing to Labour, contrary to the national trend, making it the 15th most marginal Conservative seat by percentage of majority.

Faiza Shaheen, who had been Labour's candidate in 2019, was again selected as candidate by the local party in 2022, but was deselected after the July 2024 election was announced due to the nature of social media posts she had liked. She then resigned from the Labour Party and stood as an independent candidate for the constituency. Prior to that, it was described as the 10th most likely seat to switch in a ranking of Labour's targets.

== Boundaries ==
Map of boundaries 1997-2024

=== 1997–2024 ===
The London Borough of Waltham Forest wards of Chingford Green, Endlebury, Hale End and Highams Park, Hatch Lane, Larkswood, Valley, and the London Borough of Redbridge wards of Church End and Monkhams.

Following a review of ward boundaries which became effective in May 2017, the parts in the London Borough of Redbridge comprised the Monkhams ward, most of the Churchfields ward and part of the South Woodford ward.

=== Current ===
Further to the 2023 review of Westminster constituencies and taking account of a local government boundary review in Waltham Forest in May 2022, the constituency comprises the following from the 2024 general election:

- The London Borough of Redbridge wards of Bridge, Churchfields, and Monkhams.
- The London Borough of Waltham Forest wards of Chingford Green, Endlebury, Hale End and Highams Park South (most), Hatch Lane and Highams Park North, Larkswood (most), Valley, and Upper Walthamstow (part).

In Redbridge Borough, the constituency was expanded to the east to include the Bridge ward and the remainder of the Churchfields ward, transferred from Ilford North. The part of the South Woodford ward was transferred to Leyton and Wanstead. The boundaries within Waltham Forest Borough were unchanged.

== Member of Parliament ==
Election	Member	Party	Notes
1997	Iain Duncan Smith	Conservative	MP for Chingford (1992–1997)

== Elections ==
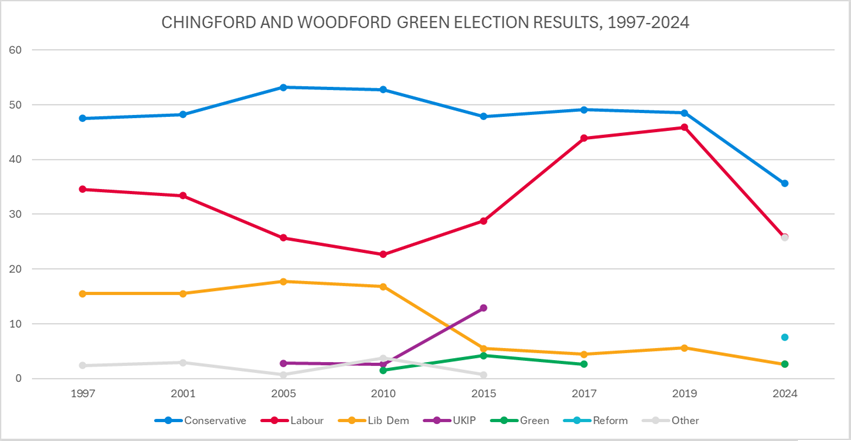
Election results 1997-2024

=== Elections in the 2020s ===
General election 2024: Chingford and Woodford Green
Party	Candidate	Votes	%	±%
Conservative	Iain Duncan Smith	17,281	35.6	−12.6
Labour	Shama Tatler	12,524	25.8	−19.5
Independent	Faiza Shaheen	12,445	25.7	N/A
Reform	Paul Luggeri	3,653	7.5	+7.2
Green	Chris Brody (Note: After nominations for the 2024 general election closed, the Green Party suspended Chris Brody and withdrew all support for his campaign on 21 June 2024.)	1,334	2.7	+2.3
Liberal Democrats	Josh Hadley	1,275	2.6	−3.2
Majority		4,758	9.8	+7.2
Turnout		48,512	64.5	−7.7
Registered electors		75,178		
Conservative hold		Swing	+3.5	

=== Elections in the 2010s ===
2019 notional result (Note: Estimate of the 2019 general election result as if the revised boundaries recommended under the 2023 boundary review were in place)
Party	Vote	%
Conservative	26,322	48.2
Labour	24,718	45.3
Liberal Democrats	3,193	5.8
Green	213	0.4
Brexit Party	160	0.3
Majority	1,604	2.9
Turnout	54,606	72.2
Electorate	75,677	

General election 2019: Chingford and Woodford Green
Party	Candidate	Votes	%	±%
Conservative	Iain Duncan Smith	23,481	48.5	−0.6
Labour	Faiza Shaheen	22,219	45.9	+2.0
Liberal Democrats	Geoffrey Seeff	2,744	5.6	+1.2
Majority		1,262	2.6	−2.6
Turnout		48,444	74.1	+2.9
Registered electors		65,393		
Conservative hold		Swing	−1.3	

General election 2017: Chingford and Woodford Green
Party	Candidate	Votes	%	±%
Conservative	Iain Duncan Smith	23,076	49.1	+1.2
Labour	Bilal Mahmood	20,638	43.9	+15.1
Liberal Democrats	Deborah Unger	2,043	4.4	−1.1
Green	Sinead King	1,204	2.6	−1.6
Majority		2,438	5.2	−13.9
Turnout		46,961	71.2	+5.5
Registered electors		65,958		
Conservative hold		Swing	−7.0	

General election 2015: Chingford and Woodford Green
Party	Candidate	Votes	%	±%
Conservative	Iain Duncan Smith	20,999	47.9	−4.9
Labour	Bilal Mahmood	12,613	28.8	+6.1
UKIP	Freddy Vachha	5,644	12.9	+10.3
Liberal Democrats	Anne Crook	2,400	5.5	−11.3
Green	Rebecca Tully	1,854	4.2	+2.7
TUSC	Len Hockey	241	0.6	New
Class War	Lisa Mckenzie	53	0.1	New
Majority		8,386	19.1	−11.0
Turnout		43,804	65.7	−0.8
Registered electors		66,680		
Conservative hold		Swing	−5.5	

General election 2010: Chingford and Woodford Green
Party	Candidate	Votes	%	±%
Conservative	Iain Duncan Smith	22,743	52.8	−0.4
Labour	Cath Arakelian	9,780	22.7	−3.0
Liberal Democrats	Geoffrey Seeff	7,242	16.8	−0.9
BNP	Julian Leppert	1,288	3.0	New
UKIP	Nick Jones	1,133	2.6	−0.2
Green	Lucy Craig	650	1.5	New
Independent	None Of The Above (Note: Original name Adam Osen)	202	0.5	New
Independent	Barry White	68	0.2	New
Majority		12,963	30.1	+2.6
Turnout		43,106	66.5	+3.5
Registered electors		64,831		
Conservative hold		Swing	+1.3	

=== Elections in the 2000s ===
General election 2005: Chingford and Woodford Green
Party	Candidate	Votes	%	±%
Conservative	Iain Duncan Smith	20,555	53.2	+5.0
Labour	Simon Wright	9,914	25.7	−7.7
Liberal Democrats	John Beanse	6,832	17.7	+2.2
UKIP	Michael McGough	1,078	2.8	New
Independent	Barry White	269	0.7	New
Majority		10,641	27.5	+12.7
Turnout		38,648	63.0	+1.5
Registered electors		61,386		
Conservative hold		Swing	+6.4	

General election 2001: Chingford and Woodford Green
Party	Candidate	Votes	%	±%
Conservative	Iain Duncan Smith	17,834	48.2	+0.7
Labour	Jessica Webb	12,347	33.4	−1.2
Liberal Democrats	John Beanse	5,739	15.5	0.0
BNP	Jean Griffin	1,062	2.9	+0.5
Majority		5,487	14.8	+1.9
Turnout		36,982	58.5	−12.2
Registered electors		63,252		
Conservative hold		Swing	+1.0	

=== Elections in the 1990s ===
General election 1997: Chingford and Woodford Green
Party	Candidate	Votes	%	±%
Conservative	Iain Duncan Smith	21,109	47.5	
Labour	Tommy Hutchinson	15,395	34.6	
Liberal Democrats	Geoffrey Seeff	6,885	15.5	
BNP	Alan Gould	1,059	2.4	
Majority		5,714	12.9	
Turnout		44,448	70.7	
Registered electors		62,904		
Conservative win (new seat)				

== See also ==
- Parliamentary constituencies in London

== Sources ==
- Election result, 2005 (BBC)
- Election results, 1997 – 2001 (BBC)
- Election results, 1997 – 2005 (Election Demon)
- Election results, 1997 – 2005 (Guardian)

Parliament of the United Kingdom
Preceded by Richmond (Yorks)	Constituency represented by the leader of the opposition 2001–2003	Succeeded by Folkestone and Hythe
