= Highams Park Lake =

Water feature in a London park

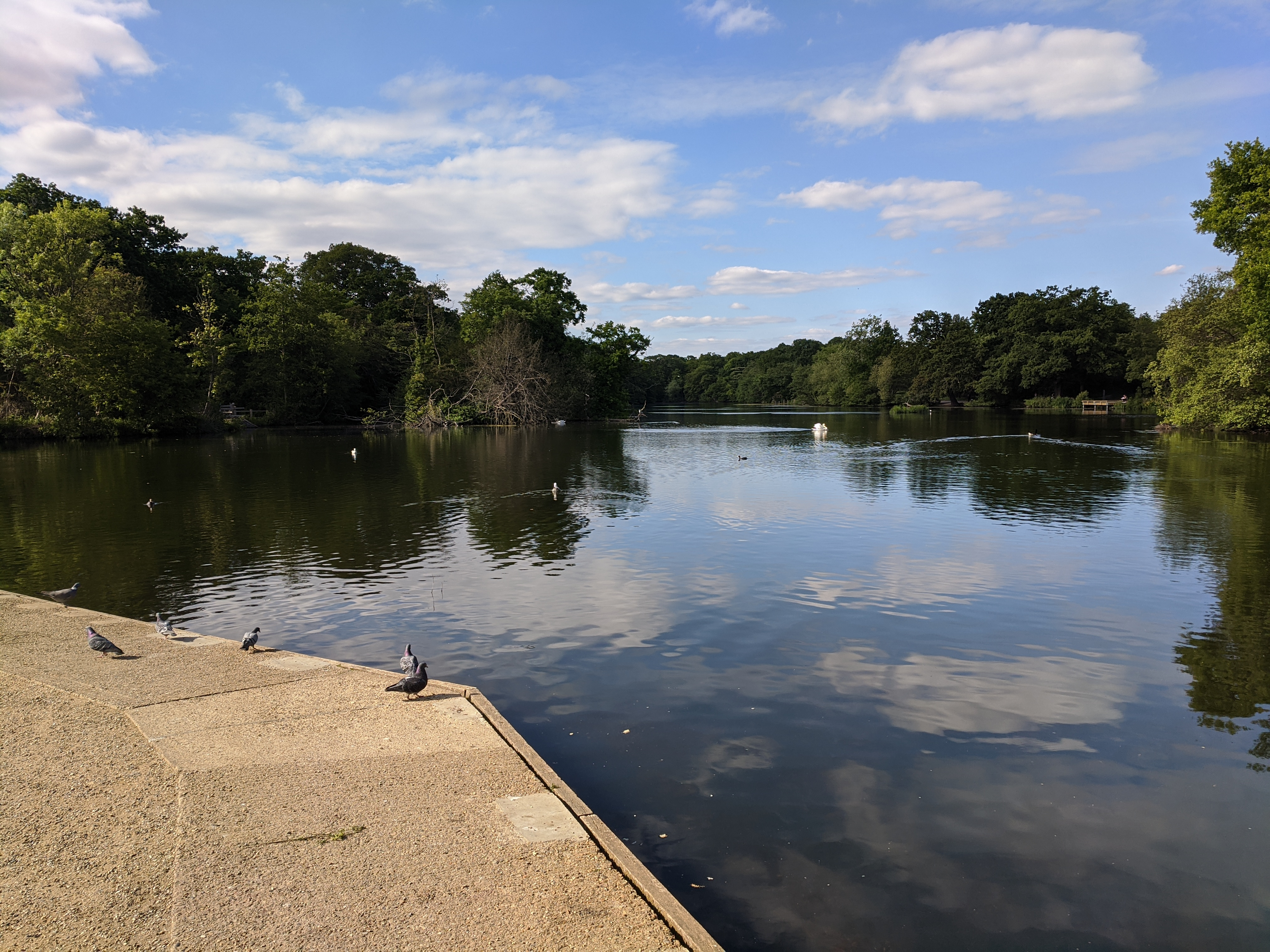

- Location within Greater London Location within England
- Location: Highams Park, Waltham Forest, London, United Kingdom
- Coordinates: 51°36′38″N 0°00′36″E

Highams Park Lake is a water feature in The Highams Park, in the district of Highams Park in the London Borough of Waltham Forest.

== History ==
Highams Park Lake was formed in the early 19th century by the landscape gardener Humphry Repton, who diverted the River Ching, which flooded the site to create the lake. Repton made his plan in 1793. A summerhouse by the lake, which was made from stones from the old London Bridge, was demolished in 1831.

The lake was part of the grounds of the large Manor of Highams, built in 1768 and converted into a hospital for wounded soldiers during the Crimean War of 1853–1856, and today the Woodford County High School for Girls. The lake was given to the public in the late 19th century.

There has been a boating history for over 100 years on this lake with an "old boat house". The boathouse today is leased from the Corporation of London by Waltham Forest South District Scouts who have spent a considerable amount of money in developing the boathouse and making it functional again.

The lake was featured on the BBC Blue Peter children's programme in the late 1970s, when the whole boat house roof had to be lifted off to extract a large yacht, which had been restored inside it by the club members, onto a large craned lorry to take the vessel to the sea. Money was raised by the children collecting old newspapers from the Chingford and Highams Park community once a week and then selling them by weight. The yacht club owner helped them to build the club boats, which were single sailed yachts (mostly Flies) scaled down to child size, and only charged about 45p a week club fees to boys who could afford it – for the rest it was free. The Fly class boats were built at the clubhouse by the club owner Ken Ford. The Fly class boats were also built "on stand" at the London boat show for some years hoping to gain commercial recognition.

Other yachts used on the lake in the 1960s up to the 1980s were the Moth IV (a larger boat than the Flies). The boys who were members of the Lee Avon Sailing Club came from a wide variety of social classes but all learned valuable woodworking, sailing and community skills.

== Highams Park ==
Highams Park is a large area of parkland adjacent to the lake. In the 1940s "prefab" houses were built and stood above the lake; they were demolished in 1969. The park borders Woodford Green and reaches close to Chingford Hatch. The park is surrounded by a housing estate known as the Highams Estate.

== Maintenance ==
Following a panel engineer's report major works were planned for the Highams Park Lake area over the following three years. Highams Park had been upgraded to a Category A Reservoir, meaning that flooding at the site has the potential to cause deaths. The Highams Park Forum was concerned to ensure that any work undertaken would be sensitive to the Repton landscape, which is one of Repton's Red Book designs. The existing dam would need to be raised and it was expected to be a challenge to do this work sympathetically to the Repton landscape.

== See also ==
- Highams Park School
- Highams Estate
- Highams Park Station
- Hale End
