= Have I the Right? =

1964 single by The Honeycombs

- West German picture sleeve

Single by the Honeycombs
- B-side: "Please Don't Pretend Again"
- Released: 23 June 1964
- Studio: RGM Sound, London
- Genre: Pop
- Length: 2:57
- Label: Pye (UK); Interphon (US)
- Songwriters: Ken Howard, Alan Blaikley
- Producer: Joe Meek

The Honeycombs singles chronology
"Have I the Right?" (1964)	"Is It Because" (1964)

Official audio
- "Have I the Right?" on YouTube

"Have I the Right?" was the debut single and biggest hit of the English band the Honeycombs. It was composed by Ken Howard and Alan Blaikley, who had made contact with the Honeycombs, a London-based group, then playing under the name of the Sheratons, in the Mildmay Tavern in the Balls Pond Road in Islington, where they played a date. Howard and Blaikley were impressed by the group's lead vocalist, Dennis D'Ell, and the fact that they had a female drummer, Anne ('Honey') Lantree. The group were looking for material to play for an audition with record producer Joe Meek, and they played the songs Howard and Blaikley had just given them. Meek decided to record one of them, "Have I the Right?", there and then. Meek himself provided the B-side, "Please Don't Pretend Again".

Music critic Tom Ewing, writing for Freaky Trigger, commented that the song "invents" post-punk, "which is to say, when I listen to the instrumental break on this record, bright guitar and sharp keyboard slicing tuneless chunks out of each other, it's not 1964 I'm hearing." It was used as the opening theme for Hold the Sunset, and in the 2007 film I Could Never Be Your Woman.

== Recording of the song ==
Meek used his apartment at 304 Holloway Road, Islington (north London) as a recording studio. Three U.K. No.1 hits were produced there: "Johnny Remember Me" by John Leyton in 1961, "Telstar" by the Tornados in 1962, and the last of them, "Have I the Right?" in 1964.

Conspicuous in "Have I the Right?" is the prominent part of the drums that carry the song. Their effect was enhanced by having the members of the group stamp their feet on the wooden stairs to the studio. Meek recorded the sound with five microphones he had fixed to the banisters with bicycle clips. For the finishing touch someone beat a tambourine directly onto a microphone. The recording was somewhat speeded up, reportedly to the disappointment of Dennis D'Ell, who regretted that he could not reproduce this sound on stage.

== Personnel ==
- Denis D'Ell – vocals
- Martin Murray – guitar
- Alan Ward – guitar
- John Lantree – bass guitar
- Honey Lantree – drums
- Uncredited – tambourine

== Chart success ==
"Have I the Right?" was presented by Meek to several major labels, who turned it down. It was released in the UK on 23 June 1964 by Pye Records. Louis Benjamin, Pye's later chairman, rechristened the group The Honeycombs, a pun on the drummer's name and her job as a hairdresser's assistant. The single's sales started slowly, but by the end of July the record started to climb in the UK Singles Chart. At the end of August the record reached No. 1. Outside the UK "Have I the Right?" was a big success too. The song became No. 1 in Australia, Canada and Sweden. In the US the record reached No. 5 and in the Netherlands No. 2. In August 1964, the Honeycombs were awarded a Silver Disc by Disc magazine for the sales of 250,000 copies of the single in the UK, and by October 1964 "Have I the Right?" had sold roughly one million copies worldwide.

== Lawsuit ==
In July 1965, the British music magazine NME reported that it had been agreed in the London High Court that "Have I the Right?" was the work of Howard and Blaikley. Composer Geoff Goddard agreed to drop allegations that he, and not they, had written the song. Goddard had been Meek's principal songwriter, but the two had fallen out. He claimed that the song was adapted from his earlier song "Give Me The Chance", but was too shy to testify in court.

== German version ==
The Honeycombs also recorded a German version of the song: "Hab ich das Recht?" (Deutsche Vogue, DV 14210). Both the English and the German version reached No. 21 in the German charts: the English one in October, the German one in November 1964. The German version was recorded without the group's stamping their feet on the stairs and without speeding up. One line was left out, so the German version is still shorter than the English one.

== Later versions ==
The song was recorded 13 years later, in 1977, by Scottish boy band Dead End Kids. Their version peaked at number six in the UK singles chart, and topped the Irish pop charts for two weeks.. It also peaked at number 36 in Australia. Dead Kennedys played the song in their concerts in the 1970s. A version is featured on their live album Live at the Deaf Club. Off Broadway included the song on their 1997 album Fallin' In. The song appears on the 2006 live album Rockin' the Paradiso by Chris Spedding and Robert Gordon.

== Charts ==
Chart (1964–1965)	Peak position
Australia (Kent Music Report)	1
Canada Top Singles (RPM)	1
Finland (Suomen virallinen lista)	20
Germany (GfK)	21
Ireland (IRMA)	3
Netherlands (Single Top 100)	3
New Zealand (Lever Hit Parade)	1
Norway (VG-lista)	7
Sweden (Kvällstoppen)	1
UK Singles (Official Charts)	1
US Billboard Hot 100	5
