= Highams Estate =

Housing estate in east London

Coordinates: 51.609°N 0.015°E

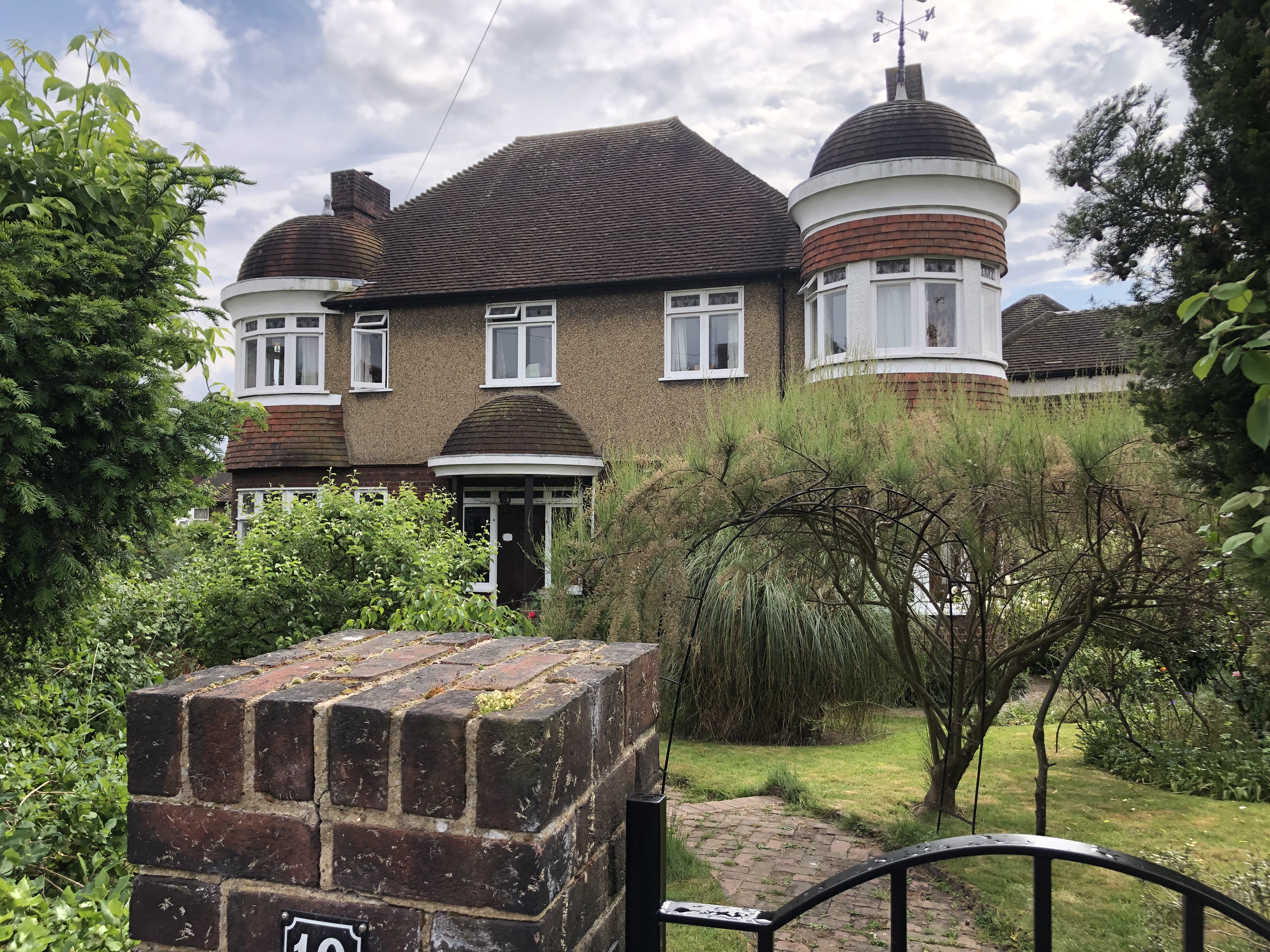
19 Crealock Grove, or "Pepperpots" was owned by The Estate manager and retains many original architectural and interior features.

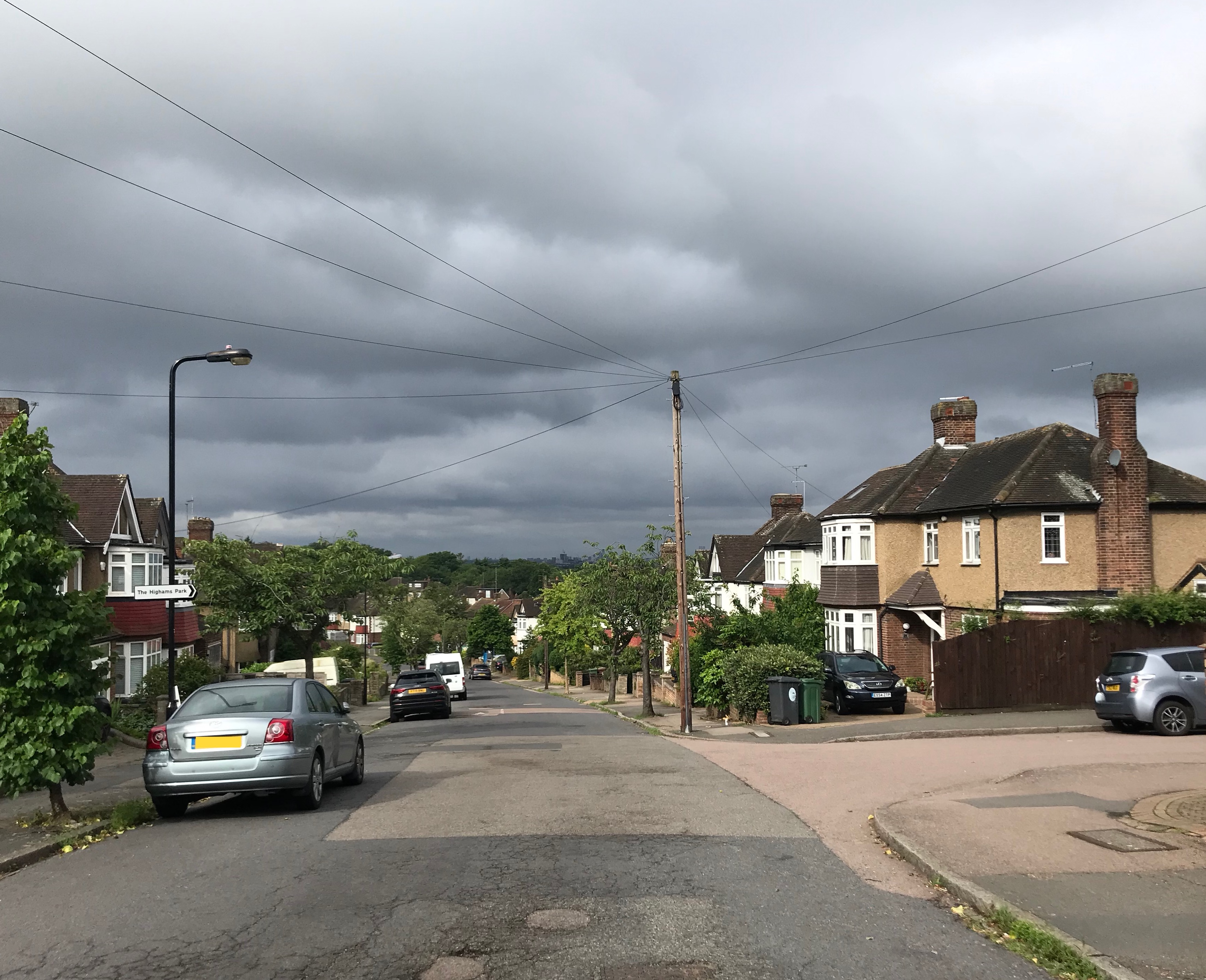
View down Henry's Avenue showing the architecture typical of the Highams Estate, and its proximity to the City of London, visible on the horizon.

The Highams Estate is a housing estate in Waltham Forest in East London, near to Hale End (Highams Park) and Woodford Green. The area was developed by Thomas Courtenay Warner, within the grounds of the former Highams Manor House in the 1930s.

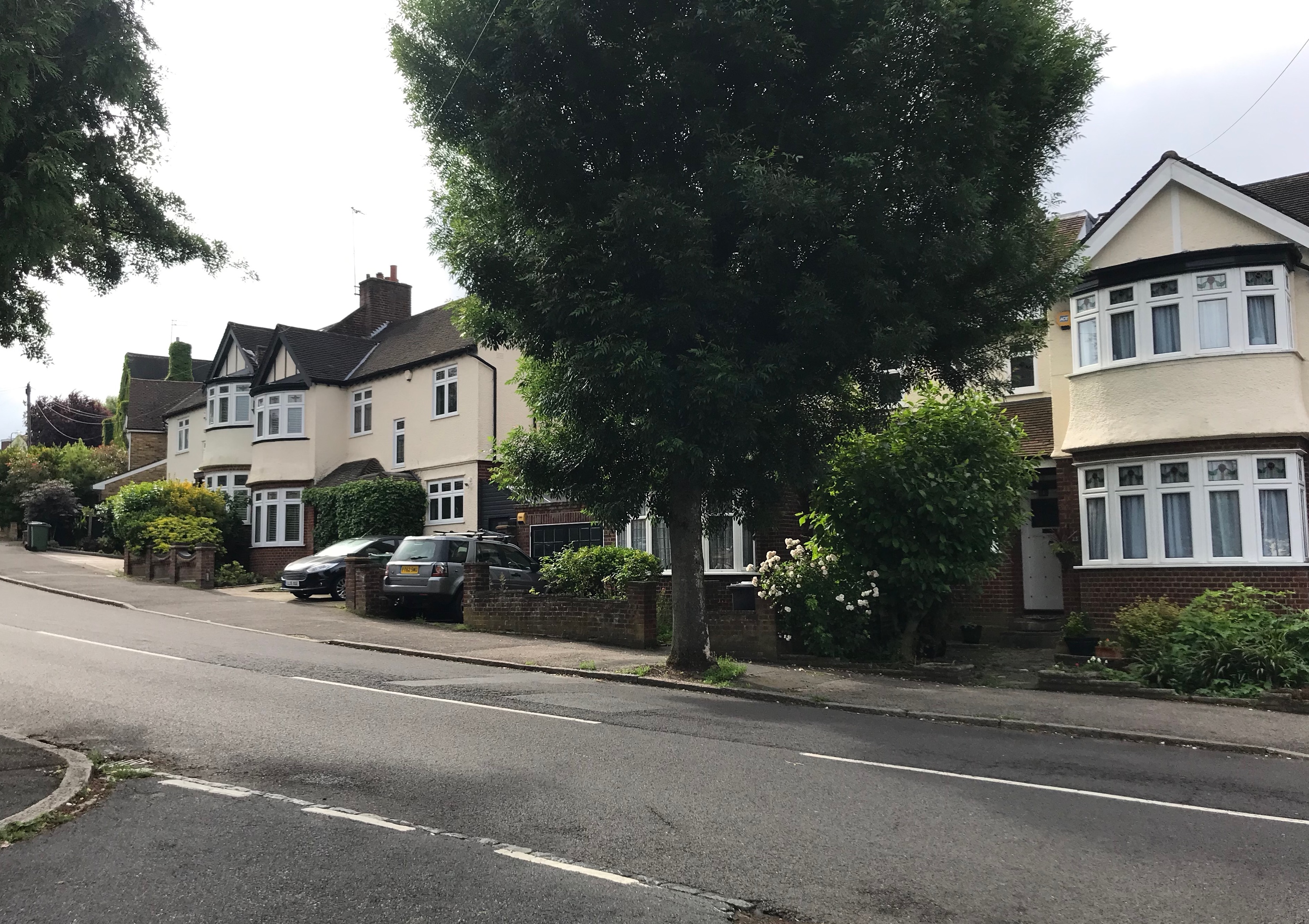
A view of The Charter Road from the green between it and Henry's Avenue, showing semi-detached houses in the Highams Estate

== Extent ==
The Highams Estate comprises over 300 semi-detached and detached homes bounded by The Highams Park to the west, Chingford Lane to the north and east, and Oak Hill to the south.

The roads that make up The Highams Estate are:

- Crealock Grove (1930): named after Malcolm Crealock, a director of the Warner Estate and Law Land Building Dept.
- Henry's Avenue (1930): named after Sir Henry Warner
- Keynsham Avenue (1934): until 1897, Courtenay Warner owned an estate near Keynsham in Somerset
- Lichfield Road (1933): Courtenay Warner was a Liberal MP for Lichfield, Staffs. 1896 - 1923
- Marion Grove (1936): origins of this name are unknown
- Mason Road (1933): commemorating the family's involvement in Freemasonry
- Montalt Road (1897): named after Earl de Montalt, 4th Viscount Hawarden and father-in-law to Courtenay Warner
- Nesta Road (1932): named after the Hon. Nesta Douglas-Pennant who married Edward Warner in 1920
- Tamworth Avenue (1934): Tamworth, Staffs. was part of Courtenay Warner's Lichfield constituency
- The Charter Road (1930): Courtenay Warner was the Charter Mayor of Walthamstow

While the estate is located in the Borough of Waltham Forest, the postal code is Woodford Green (IG).

== History ==
The area in question was previously known as "The Sale", which appeared in maps from around 1641; in 1650 all the timber from the 150 acres of woodland in The Sale was sold off by the Lord of the Manor, Sir William Rowe. A new manor house was built in 1768 by Anthony Bacon at its easterly end, and named ‘Highams’. In 1793-4 then owner John Harman commissioned Humphry Repton to design extensive pleasure gardens and a man-made lake. In 1849, Highams became the property of Edward Warner. Open land was becoming a premium in the area, and parcels of the estate began to be sold off for development. In 1891, thirty acres of land, including the lake were purchased for £6,000 and added to Epping Forest. Edward Warner's second son, Courtenay Warner, formed the Warner Estate Ltd. in the same year, to manage the manor house. In 1897 a company jointly owned by Warner Estate Ltd. and the Law Land Ltd. was formed, and in 1898 the Law Land Building Department undertook all building development.

Courtenay Warner's company began to develop the grounds in 1897, with the erection of 24 substantial homes in Montalt Road, and 18 houses and 68 tenements in Chingford Lane built in the "Warner style" used the same architectural designs as the Warner Estate in Walthamstow.

New roads were constructed in 1930; The Charter Road was achieved through an exchange of land between Essex County Council (who owned the School) and Warner. Because the council refused to contribute to the cost of the new road, a strip of land was retained by Warner and an indenture dated 4 December 1922 stated "that the Council, their successors or assigns shall not be entitled to pass or repass or use the proposed road or any part thereof…". The agreement was implemented in 1932.

In 1934, Sir Edward Warner agreed to sell the undeveloped parts of the estate between Montalt Road and Henry's Avenue to Walthamstow Council, with the intention that it was to be used as a public open space.

== Design ==
The architects William and Edward Hunt initially produced designs for 532 houses over 36 hectares of the estate, although these plans were scaled back to include just over 300 homes.

Plots averaged a generous 40 feet by 120 feet. The publicity for the Highams Estate promised “an exceptionally healthy elevation – 230 feet above sea level and a bracing atmosphere of decidedly health-giving quality”. Various standardised configurations were offered with between 3 and 5 bedrooms, identified as house types A-H. They were mainly semi-detached, with detached houses on most corners. Some had integrated garages, others could have independent garages added for between £75 and £100.

The semi-detached buildings are predominantly symmetrical, set as pavilion forms, with views in between to reveal mature trees and woodland. Materials vary in detail but mostly are built in red brick and pebbledash render. Roofs are clad in red weathered clay tiles on steep roofs, with dominant symmetrical chimney stacks. Windows are vertical and bay windows are an almost universal feature. The detached buildings follow this form.

The lowest price for a property on the estate in the early 1930s was £1000, but this was comparatively expensive and because there was a lack of demand, more modestly priced homes were developed in the northwest corner of the estate. This second phase of the estate was known as the Montalt Estate.

The quality and distinctive design of the architecture used contributed significantly to the character of The Highams Estate. This was recognised by Waltham Forest Council when it was granted Area of Special Character status in 1988. Additionally, an Article 4 direction, put in place to retain high-quality architectural features and ensure any changes consider their surroundings, came into force on 2 September 2020.

== Highams Residents' Association (HRA) ==
Formed in 1955, Highams Residents' Association was created to prevent indiscriminate development of the Estate and preserve its character for future generations of residents.

Following the removal of 176 prefabricated bungalows on the open space sold to Walthamstow Council, the HRA successfully lobbied the council to restore the land for public use as a park. The park is now known as The Highams Park.

In 1983, Sir Henry Warner gifted HRA the ransom strip along the perimeter of girls' school, adjacent to The Charter Road, and a strip of land between Woodford Rugby Club grounds and the bottom end of Nesta Road. This gives residents control over two large undeveloped green areas, which help contribute to the area's character.

The HRA continues to lobby against unsuitable developments within The Highams Estate on behalf of its residents.
