= Highams Park =

District of London, England

Coordinates: 51.6059°N 0.0151°W

- The County Arms pub (left) and former Regal cinema (right) on Hale End Road

- Location within Greater London
- Population: 11,355
- OS grid reference: TQ375915
- London borough: Waltham Forest
- Ceremonial county: Greater London
- Region: London
- Country: England
- Sovereign state: United Kingdom
- Post town: LONDON
- Postcode district: E4
- Post town: WOODFORD GREEN
- Postcode district: IG8
- Dialling code: 020
- Police: Metropolitan
- Fire: London
- Ambulance: London
- UK Parliament: Chingford and Woodford Green
- London Assembly: North East

Highams Park is a suburban district in east London, England, within the London Borough of Waltham Forest, 8.8 miles (14.2 km) north-east of Charing Cross. It sits on the western edge of Epping Forest, with Chingford Hatch to the north, Woodford to the east, Hale End and Walthamstow to the south, and Chingford Mount to the west.

The earliest recorded settlement was a small Saxon one near this location in the Great Forest of Waltham. Vikings are thought to have arrived here after sailing up the River Lea. The Saxon lord, Haldane, is noted as possessing lands stretching from the Lea marshes to the highest point in the forest. He relinquished these lands after the Norman Invasion of 1066. By the beginning of the 14th century, the renamed Manor of Higham Bensted(e) was divided into two, with the smaller manor of Salisbury Hall including Chapel End and Hale End.. Historically, it has been in the county of Essex, and part of Walthamstow parish and municipal borough. It is primarily a residential area, with mainly Victorian and 1930s terraced houses.

== Governance ==
Highams Park is part of the Chingford and Woodford Green constituency for elections to the House of Commons of the United Kingdom.

Highams Park is covered by the Hale End and Highams Park South and Hatch Lane and Highams Park North wards for elections to Waltham Forest London Borough Council.

== Hale End ==
The entire Highams Park area was once known as Hale End, as evidenced by the names of Hale End Library and the Halex factory.

Although postcode areas are not intended to define districts, it can be said that Hale End approximates to the part of Highams Park which shares the postal district of IG8 with Woodford Green. The rest of Highams Park falls within the Chingford postal district, E4. The park from which the area is named is partially located within the IG8 postcode area.

== Education ==
=== Schools ===
==== Primary schools ====
- Handsworth Primary School
- Selwyn Primary School (Previously Infants and Juniors).
- There are also three other primary schools in the area: Ainslie Wood Primary School (South Chingford), Oak Hill Primary School (Hale End) and Thorpe Hall School (Walthamstow), which are close to Highams Park.

==== Secondary schools ====
- Highams Park School (formerly known as Sydney Burnell School). The school has pupils aged 11–16 and also has a sixth form college for pupils aged 16–18. The school holds dual specialist status as a Technology College and a Sports College.

==== Special schools ====
- The Joseph Clark School for partially sighted and blind pupils is a combined primary and secondary school.

=== Library ===
- Hale End Library is located in Highams Park and is situated on The Avenue, having been refurbished between January and July 2007.

== Sports and recreation ==
There are two main sports grounds in Highams Park, Jubilee Sports Ground (formerly Truman's Sports Ground) and Rolls Park. Jubilee is situated off The Avenue, and Waltham Forest Council now owns it. It is mainly used for football, with local teams and youth teams training and playing on the field and astro-turf. The ground is not open to the public. Rolls Park is slightly bigger and is open to the public. The field is used mainly for football and cricket. There is also a tennis club and a small gym at the edges of the field. West Essex football and cricket clubs also own a bar and a clubroom.

There is another Tennis club (Whitehalls) situated on Larkshall Road. Highams Park Lake is used for Kayaking by members of The Scout Association.

== "The Highams Park" and Highams Park Lake ==
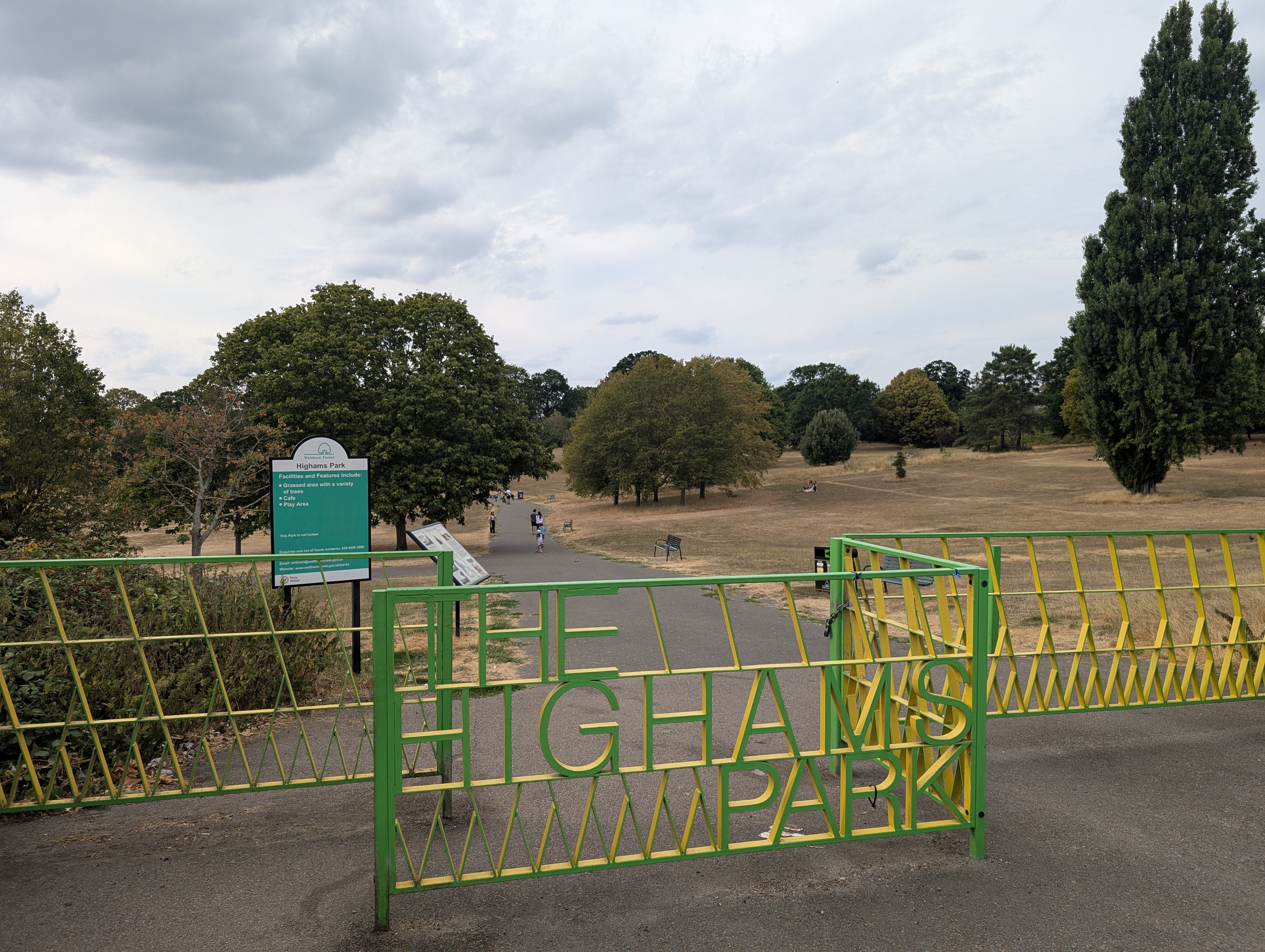
Eastern entrance to the Highams Park

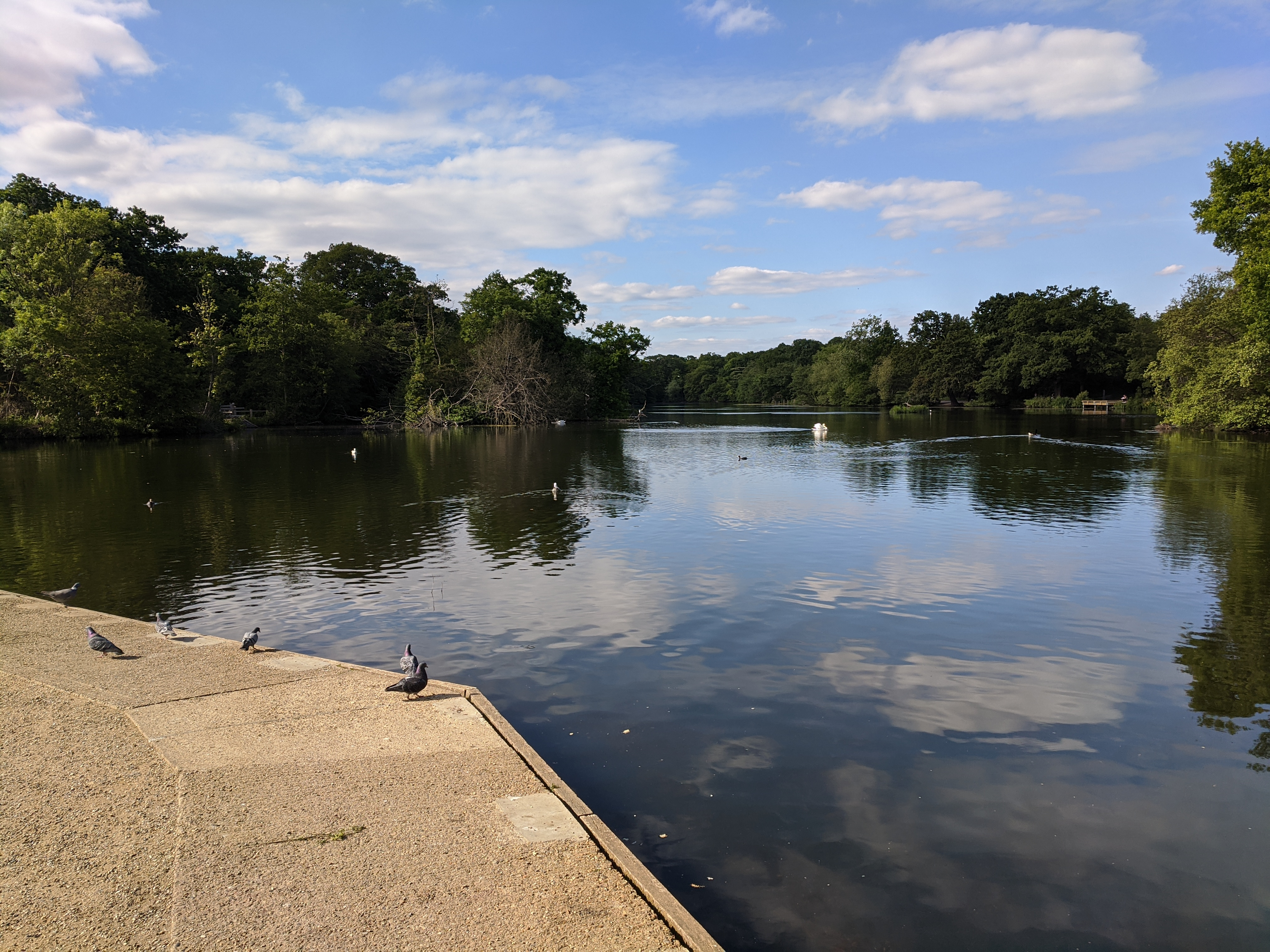
Highams Park Lake

Most of the park is on a hill with a gradual rise to the north end. The park has a cafe and a playground.

Highams Park Lake is to the west of the park, and is owned by the City of London Corporation, although the London Borough of Waltham Forest maintains the rest of the park. The lake was formed by the landscape gardener Humphry Repton, who created it by damming the River Ching. The lake, adjoining park and the Manor House (now Woodford County High School) were known as Highams Bensted. The last owner, Sir Thomas Courtenay Warner, built both the Warner Estate in Walthamstow and the Highams Estate; the latter bounds the park to the north and east. The lake itself is about 450m long and about 80m wide at the widest point. At the south end of the lake was a boathouse built by Kenneth Robert John Ford and owned by Waltham Forest South Scouts. The boathouse burned down in September 2025 and has since been demolished. The north end of the lake is much narrower and shallower, and it often dries out into mud in the summer. The River Ching flows past the lake but does not flow into it; a small outflow at the south end of the lake flows into the river.

There is a small island in the lake where swans nest. Near the north end of the lake are some large rocks thought to have been placed there by Humphry Repton to improve the lake's appearance. A public toilet block used to be situated on the east side of the lake, although it was demolished many years ago, and only the foundations remain.

== Halex and Tesco ==
The Halex factory, situated on Larkshall Road, was a major local employer from 1897 to 1971. The British Xylonite Company established the factory to produce a variety of goods, mostly from plastic. The Halex company had a virtual monopoly on manufacturing table tennis balls. The factory closed in the early 1970s and has since been demolished and replaced by new, smaller factories and industrial buildings. A blue plaque on Jubilee Avenue marks the spot where the building stood; it reads "Plastics Historical Society. On this site, from 1897–1971, stood the Halex factory of the British Xylonite Company."

Some of the land in this area is now owned by the supermarket chain Tesco, which was initially refused permission to build a store on the site in June 2007 by then Local Government Secretary Ruth Kelly after a protracted process of planning applications dating back to early 2005. The reasons cited for the refusal involved the size of the proposed store and the building not being in keeping with local Victorian and Edwardian buildings. However, in 2009, a revised planning application was passed despite the efforts of some local residents to stop this from happening.

A recent campaign seeks to honour the men of Highams Park who worked in the Halex Factory and gave their lives in both world wars. The campaigners also wish to see the return of the local war memorial to its original site.

== Railway ==
Highams Park station is on the London Overground Chingford branch, which runs from London Liverpool Street to Chingford. The line is one of the Lea Valley lines. The railway line cuts through the area with a level crossing, close to the station, this being the only place actually in Highams Park where vehicles can cross the track. The level crossing itself, until 2002, was controlled by a signalman who worked in the traditional signal box next to the crossing. However, in 2002, despite local opposition, the gates began to be operated from a central office at Liverpool Street station. The signal box was marked for demolition, but due to the efforts of "The Highams Park Forum" (a group of local residents), and local Member of Parliament (and then leader of the Conservative Party) Iain Duncan Smith, the box was saved with the intention of turning it into a museum or a tearoom. In 2017, the signal box was reopened as a crêperie called LaBoite.

== Buses ==
Highams Park is served by London Buses routes 212, 275, W16 and school route 675.

== Notable residents ==
- Harris Dickinson, English actor and director.
- Trevor Bailey, Essex and England cricketer.
- Graham Barnfield, pundit and academic, moved to Highams Park in 2001.
- John Berger, socialist artist and writer, lived in Highams Park as a child.
- Blazin' Squad (group): Members of the boy band Blazin' Squad lived in or near Highams Park and attended Highams Park School.
- Johnny Dankworth, musician and soloist, was born in Highams Park in 1927.
- Olivia Dean, Grammy award-winning singer-songwriter grew up in Highams Park
- Sir George Edwards, aircraft designer and industrialist, was born in Hale End Road, Highams Park, on 9 July 1908.
- John Maxwell Hutchinson, English architect, BBC broadcaster, and Anglican deacon, was the former President of the Royal Institute of British Architects.
- Chris Moncrieff, political journalist.
- Tara Moran, actress.
- Fred Pontin, founder of the holiday parks company Pontins, was born in Highams Park in 1906. He lived in Forest Glade and attended Sir George Monoux Grammar School in Walthamstow.
- Teddy Sheringham, footballer, was born on 2 April 1966 in Highams Park.
- John Smith, filmmaker, born in Highams Park and attended Selwyn Avenue School and George Monoux School.

== Nearby places ==
- Chingford
- Walthamstow
- Woodford Green
- Leytonstone
