= Honey Lantree =

English drummer and singer (1943–2018)

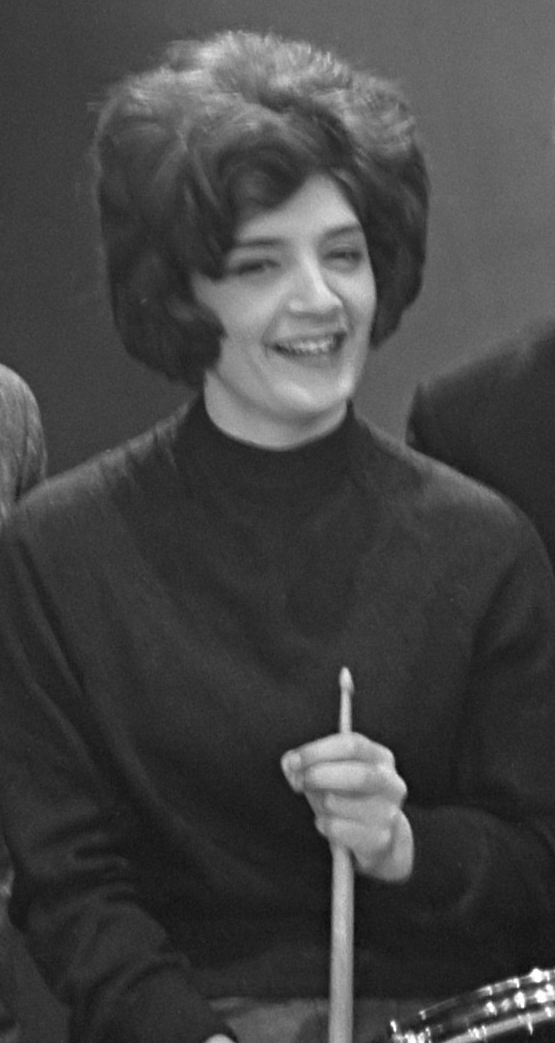
- Lantree in 1964

Background information
- Born: Anne Margot Lantree; 28 August 1943; Hayes, Middlesex, England
- Died: 23 December 2018 (aged 75) Great Bardfield, Essex, England
- Genres: Pop; rock
- Occupations: Drummer; singer
- Instruments: Drums
- Years active: 1963–2005
- Formerly of: The Honeycombs

Anne Margot "Honey" Lantree (28 August 1943 – 23 December 2018) was an English drummer and singer, best known as a member of the 1960s pop group the Honeycombs. She was one of the few female drummers to achieve prominence during the British Invasion era.

== Early life ==
Lantree was born in Hayes, Middlesex, and grew up in Highams Park, northeast London. She attended Sidney Burnell Secondary Modern School (now Highams Park School) and trained as a hairdresser.

== The Honeycombs ==
In 1963, while working at a hair salon in Hackney, Lantree discovered her aptitude for drumming when she tried playing a drum kit left at the salon by salon owner Martin Murray's amateur band, the Sheratons. Impressed by her natural talent, Murray invited her to join the group.

The Sheratons evolved into The Honeycombs in 1964 after securing a record deal with producer Joe Meek. Their debut single, "Have I the Right?", became an international hit, reaching number one on the UK Singles Chart. Lantree's drumming, augmented by stomping effects recorded on wooden stairs, contributed to the song's distinctive sound.

As the group's drummer and occasional vocalist, Lantree challenged gender stereotypes in music. She insisted that she played on every track recorded by the band, despite scepticism about her abilities due to her gender. Her vocal contributions included duets with lead singer Denis D'Ell on songs like "That's the Way".

The Honeycombs disbanded in 1967 following Meek's death and changes in musical trends. Lantree briefly returned to hairdressing but later performed with reincarnated versions of the band from the 1980s until D'Ell's death in 2005.

== Personal life and legacy ==
Lantree married David Coxall in 1969 and had two sons, Matthew and Simon. She lived most of her later years in Great Bardfield, Essex. Coxall died earlier in 2018. Lantree died on 23 December 2018, at age 75, from breast cancer.

Lantree's pioneering role as a female drummer inspired future generations of musicians, including Karen Carpenter. Her contributions to music were rediscovered through reissues of The Honeycombs' work and recognition as a trailblazer for women in rock music.
