= Dead End Kids (band) =

British pop band (1974–1979)

- Origin: Kilmarnock, Scotland
- Genres: Pop; glam rock; pop rock
- Years active: 1974–1979
- Label: CBS
- Past members: Robbie Gray (vocals); Colin Ivory (lead guitar); Alistair Kerr (bass); Davie Johnstone (keyboards); Ricky Squires (drums)

Dead End Kids, sometimes referred to as The Dead End Kids and originally styled as dEAd ENd KIdS, were a Scottish pop group who had one UK singles chart top 40 hit in 1976.

== History ==
The group was founded as Vehicle in 1974, made up of Kerr (from Dreghorn) and Johnstone (from Irvine), plus lead guitarist Drew Clark and drummer Alan Bingham. After seeing Robbie Gray performing with Kilmaurs band Canyon, Kerr suggested Gray take over lead vocals, and the band took on a new image and name, the name itself being the idea of Kerr's mother, basing themselves in Kilmarnock.

The band was spotted by Colin Robertson, of the Music And Cabaret talent agency. Before October 1975, Bingham left, not wanting to lose his apprenticeship, and Clark also quit to form a new band. The two were replaced by two musicians from Ayr - 16 year old Ivory, and Squire - and they began to move on from playing local venues to national; Ivory was four years younger than the other band members.

The band's big break came in September 1976, when they were chosen as the support act for the Bay City Rollers' national tour, and signed to CBS Records. The band's debut single, a cover of The Honeycombs' number one "Have I The Right", peaked at number 6 in the UK Singles Charts at the end of April 1977, and reached the top 2 in Sweden. The cover's greatest success however came in the Irish Singles Chart, spending 3 weeks at number 1 in May 1977.

However, the single was their only charting success. The band's sole album, Breakout, made up mostly of covers or songs written by producer Barry Blue, came out in the autumn, but missed the charts; following singles did likewise, making the band one-hit wonders. After the band split, Squires joined Heavy Metal Kids, while other members joined local bands; Kerr and Ivory formed Dance Faction, Johnstone joined the band Hollywood with former members of Yankee (including Drew Clark), and Gray formed the Long Johns, which played traditional Irish and Scots music.

== Singles discography ==
- Have I The Right (February 1977), UK no. 6, SWE no. 2, IRE no. 1
- Breakaway (June 1977)
- Glad All Over (September 1977)
- All My Love Always (November 1977)
- Heart Get Ready For Love (January 1979)
