= Churchfields =

Electoral ward in the London Borough of Redbridge

- Electoral ward for the Redbridge London Borough Council
- Churchfields ward boundaries since 2018
- Borough: Redbridge
- County: Greater London
- Population: 15,710 (2021)
- Electorate: 10,672 (2022)
- Area: 1.848 square kilometres (0.714 sq mi)

Current electoral ward
- Created: 2018
- Number of members: 3
- Councillors: Vacancy; Lloyd Duddridge; Guy Williams
- Created from: Church End, Monkhams
- GSS code: E05011238

Churchfields is an electoral ward in the London Borough of Redbridge. The ward was first used in the 2018 elections. It returns three councillors to Redbridge London Borough Council.

== List of councillors ==
Term	Councillor	Party
2018–2022	Stephen Adams	Conservative
2018–2022	Clark Vasey	Conservative
2018–2026	Rosa Gomez	Labour
2022–present	Lloyd Duddridge	Labour
2022–present	Guy Williams	Labour

== Redbridge council elections ==
=== 2026 election ===
Rosa Gomez was disqualified in March 2026, with the by-election deferred until May 2026. (Note: Casual vacancies occurring within six months of scheduled elections are not filled.)

=== 2022 election ===
The election took place on 5 May 2022.

2022 Redbridge London Borough Council election: Churchfields (3)
Party	Candidate	Votes	%	±%
Labour	Rosa Gomez	2,173	44.6	▲7.0
Labour	Lloyd Duddridge	2,064	42.4	▲9.3
Labour	Guy Williams	1,777	36.5	▲5.2
Conservative	Stephen Adams	1,679	34.5	▼4.5
Conservative	Robert Cole	1,567	32.2	▼6.5
Conservative	Garry Sukhija	1,487	30.5	▼6.9
Liberal Democrats	Ash Holder	827	17.0	▼7.8
Liberal Democrats	Martin Rosner	784	16.1	▼7.4
Liberal Democrats	Mohammed Uddin	682	14.0	▼6.5
Green	Judith Roads	360	7.4	New
Green	Ruairi Mulhern	330	6.8	New
Green	Francis Roads	312	6.4	New
Turnout		4,873	45.7	▲2.5
Labour gain from Conservative		Swing		
Labour gain from Conservative		Swing		
Labour hold		Swing		

=== 2018 election ===
The election took place on 3 May 2018.

2018 Redbridge London Borough Council election: Churchfields (3)
Party	Candidate	Votes	%	±%
Conservative	Stephen Adams	1,832	39.02	N/A
Conservative	Clark Vasey	1,817	38.70	N/A
Labour	Rosa Gomez	1,766	37.61	N/A
Conservative	Alex Wilson	1,756	37.40	N/A
Labour	Wendy Taylor	1,552	33.06	N/A
Labour	Chowdhury Rahman	1,470	31.31	N/A
Liberal Democrats	Gwyneth Deakins	1,163	24.77	N/A
Liberal Democrats	Geoffrey Seeff	1,102	23.47	N/A
Liberal Democrats	Mike Daykin	960	20.45	N/A
Turnout		4,695	43.22	
Conservative win (new seat)				
Conservative win (new seat)				
Labour win (new seat)				
