= Warner Estate =

Neighborhood of East London

Coordinates: 51.595°N 0.024°W

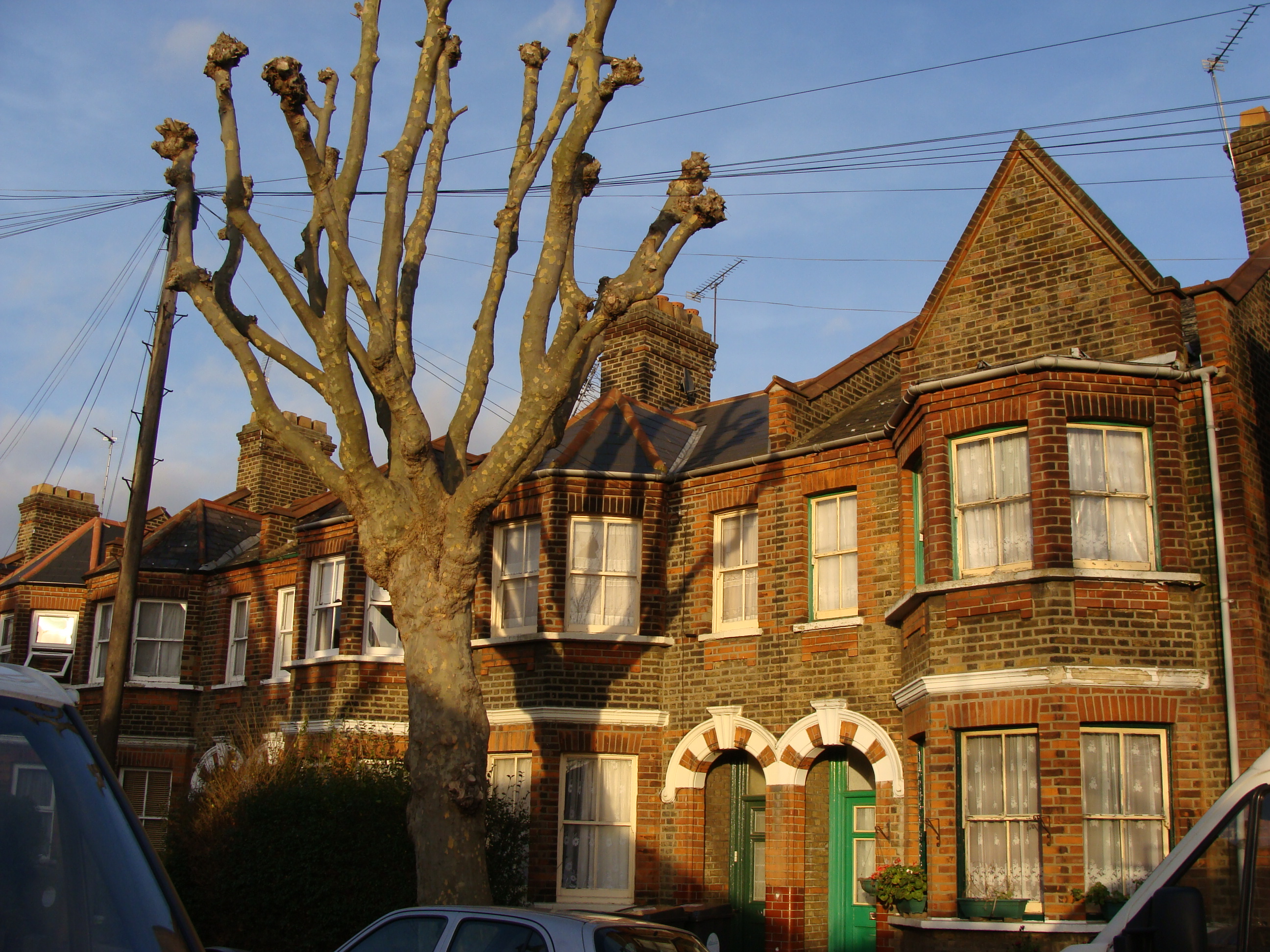
The Warner Estate

The Warner Estate is an area of housing in Walthamstow and Highams Park, Waltham Forest in East London. The area was developed by Thomas Courtenay Warner and the Warner Company.

== History ==
Thomas Courtenay Warner inherited his father's estate in Walthamstow in 1875. He began developing the Clock House Estate (which he owned). His company, The Warner Estate Co. Ltd., was registered in 1891, and in 1897 he created another company which became Courtenay Building Ltd. to construct the housing. By 1900 housing had been built on Blackhorse Lane, as well as a business development of shops and offices on Walthamstow High Street. Warner built housing on the land himself, rather than selling it off. Warner also developed the Highams Estate in Highams Park during the 1930s.

In the 1970s, many properties were transferred to the Courtenay Building Ltd. and later in the 21st century properties were sold to private buyers (and the Warner Company expanded elsewhere). In 2001 745 tenanted and 350 leasehold properties (the remainder of the Warner Estate after the previous disposals were transferred to Circle 33 Housing Association.

The Warner Company went into administration in 2013. The company had provided social housing for over 110 years, at rents slightly higher than other local landlords "with the aim of attracting a better class of tenant". The rents included "rates, taxes and fire insurance for furniture", and also offered a high standard of maintenance.

== Design ==
The homes were split into two flats. The paint scheme created a uniform appearance, and by 1900 these homes became somewhat sought after.

Between 1870 and 1914, the style was of a terrace of two-storey houses. These were built with yellow brick with red brick detailing, and the roofs were made of slate. Some properties had bay windows. The terraces at Highams Park had fanciful ornamentation picked out in white plaster. Many properties had front gardens.

The quality of the housing was high: It was "notable for the quality of their workmanship and are in distinctive styles, often in bold red brick, with gables, recessed porches, and tiled roofs".
