= Pye Records =

British record label

- Parent company: BMG Rights Management (majority of back-catalogue)
- Founded: 1955; 71 years ago
- Genre: Various
- Country of origin: UK

Pye Records is an independent British record label. It was first established in 1955 and played a major role in shaping rock 'n' roll and pop music history, with artists including Lonnie Donegan (1956–1969), Petula Clark (1955–1972), the Searchers (1963–1967), the Kinks (1964–1971), Sandie Shaw (1964–1971), Status Quo (1968–1971) and Brotherhood of Man (1975–1979). In 1980, the Pye name was dropped due to trademark issues, and the label changed its name to PRT Records (distributing as Precision Records & Tapes). In 2006, the label was briefly reactivated as Pye Records.

In September 2024, the Pye company name and trademark was acquired by the Scottish broadcaster and music producer Tony Currie, who relaunched the label with vinyl records pressed at Sea Bass Vinyl's wind-powered pressing plant in Tranent, Scotland.

== History ==
The Pye Company originally manufactured televisions and radios with its main plant situated off what used to be Haig Road, in Cambridge. The company entered the record business when it bought Nixa Records in 1953. In 1955, the company acquired Polygon Records, a label that had been established by Leslie Clark and Alan A. Freeman to control distribution of the recordings of the former's daughter, Petula Clark. Pye merged it with Nixa Records to form Pye Nixa Records.

=== Pye International ===
In 1958, Pye International Records was established. The company licensed recordings from American and other foreign labels for the United Kingdom market, including Chess, Disques Vogue (France), A&M, Kama Sutra, Colpix, Warner Bros., Buddah, Cameo, 20th Century, Casablanca Record and Filmworks and King. It also released recordings from British artist Labi Siffre which were produced outside the company.

=== Expansion ===
Pye Nixa became Pye Records in 1959, and ATV acquired 50% of the label. ATV bought the other half of the business in 1966.

Under the management of Louis Benjamin, the company entered the budget-priced album market in 1957, reissuing older Pye material on Pye Golden Guinea Records, priced at a guinea (one pound and one shilling). A series of classical recordings was released on Golden Guinea Collector; for example, a version of Handel's Music for the Royal Fireworks in 1959. This featured the conductor Charles Mackerras who made other recordings on the label, including a Janacek compilation. Golden Guinea Collector was closed in the 1970s and replaced by Marble Arch Records, selling at an even lower price.

=== Piccadilly and Dawn labels ===
A full-price subsidiary, Piccadilly Records, was for new pop acts, including Joe Brown & the Bruvvers, Clinton Ford, the Rockin' Berries, Sounds Orchestral, the Sorrows, the Bystanders, Jackie Trent and, later on, the Ivy League. In 1969, Pye launched a less mainstream label for folk, jazz, blues and progressive acts, Dawn Records. The label artists included Mungo Jerry, Man, Donovan, Comus, Titus Groan and Trifle.

=== Quadraphonic releases ===
Beginning in 1971, Pye issued a series of "4D Stereo" LP recordings in the UK. These were designed for playback in 4-channel quadraphonic sound. The records were encoded in the QS Regular Matrix system which was licensed from Sansui in Japan. Pye also marketed its own line of consumer electronics used for decoding quadraphonic records. These products were not especially successful. The last LP release in this series was in 1977.

=== As PRT Records ===
When the rights to the name Pye (then owned by Philips) expired in 1980, the label changed its name to PRT, which stood for Precision Records and Tapes, via a brief flirtation with Precision. At that time, it had sub-labels such as Fanfare Records, a late 1980s and early 1990s UK-based Hi-NRG label issuing records by Sinitta; R&B Records, a 1980s disco/electro label featuring Imagination; and Splash Records, which featured Jigsaw and the Richard Hewson Orchestra/RAH Band. PRT provided manufacturing and distribution for Gary Numan's label Numa Records, founded in 1984, which went on to release two dozen singles by a variety of acts alongside its eponymous founder, including actress Caroline Munro. Postman Pat songs and music, from the television series of the same name, were recorded at PRT Studios.

PRT's parent company ACC was purchased by The Bell Group of Australia in 1982. In 1988, the Bell Group was purchased by the Bond Corporation. However, the Bond Corporation was suffering financial problems itself and proceeded to quickly sell off most of its assets. PRT's record and cassette factory was sold to another record manufacturer, Meekland. The masters of PRT's catalogues including Pye were sold to Castle Communications, which eventually became Sanctuary Records (now a division of BMG Rights Management). Castle immediately sold the classical music part of the Pye catalogue to EMI who assigned them to EMI Classics. Precision Records & Tapes Ltd, formerly Pye Records Ltd, was officially liquidated in December 2013.

=== Brief revival ===
In July 2006, Pye Records was reactivated by Sanctuary Records as an indie and alternative label, featuring artists such as Scottish alternative rock group Idlewild. However, plans for continued usage of the Pye name were abandoned when Universal Music Group bought Sanctuary in 2007. To fulfil conditions imposed by the European Commission following UMG's acquisition of EMI in 2012, Universal sold Sanctuary to BMG Rights Management in 2013.

=== Previous ownership ===
Universal Music Group, which owned the label's catalogue from 2007 to 2013, controls the catalogue of reissues from Pye/PRT artists' releases on Sanctuary's behalf after BMG assigned UMG to distribute them in October 2023. Previously, it was distributed by Warner Music Group through its Alternative Distribution Alliance division from 2017 to 2023. WMG owns Pye's American former distributors Warner Records (formerly Warner Bros. Records) and Reprise Records.

With its acquisition of EMI Classics' catalogue in 2013, WMG now owns the Pye/PRT classical music catalogue and controls it via Warner Classics.

=== ATV Music Publishing ===
Pye Records was a sister company to the better-known ATV Music Publishing. This company, which owned the Beatles' publisher Northern Songs, was bought by Michael Jackson in 1985 and later merged with Sony to form Sony/ATV Music Publishing.

== International divisions ==
=== Pye in the US ===
Starting with the "British Invasion" of 1964, Pye placed their artists in the US mostly on labels that they distributed in the UK: the Kinks to Cameo Records and then to Reprise Records, David Bowie, the Sorrows and Petula Clark to Warner Bros. Records, Donovan to Hickory Records, the Searchers to Mercury Records, Liberty Records, and finally Kapp Records, and Status Quo to Chess Records (which issued their records on their newly created Cadet Concept Records label).

From 1969 to 1971, Pye was a co-owner with GRT (General Recorded Tape) of Janus Records, which at the outset served as the US label for such Pye acts as Jefferson, Sounds Orchestral, Pickettywitch, Mungo Jerry and Status Quo, and also re-issued the early (pre-1966) recordings of Donovan. Pye sold its share of Janus back to GRT in 1971.

In 1972, Bell Records set up a short-lived Pye label, featuring Michel Pagliaro, a Canadian artist whose first English-language album (largely recorded in England) was issued on UK Pye, and Jackie McAuley, whose lone solo album was originally issued on UK Dawn.

In 1974, Pye established an American version of its record label. The label was not a success, however, and closed its US operations in 1976. The head of the US division, Marvin Schlachter, then started Prelude Records, named after one of Pye's acts of the time, Prelude; its initial LP and 45 catalogue series were carried over from the ill-fated American Pye label (with the catalogue prefix changed from PYE- to PRL-), and Prelude had a string of disco and dance music hits into the early 1980s.

=== Pye in Canada ===
Whilst Pye did not have its own operations in Canada, it arranged with Canadian record companies to issue Pye recordings on the Pye label in Canada. Before then, Quality Records issued Pye recordings on the Quality label. Its earliest Pye Canada releases such as Lonnie Donegan's "My Old Man's A Dustman" were distributed by Astral Music Sales. Around 1963, distribution shifted to Allied Record Corporation. In 1968 distribution shifted to Phonodisc.

== Roster ==
(including the US labels that issued records by the artists during the time they were on Pye)

- Shirley Abicair
- Long John Baldry (issued in the US on Warner Bros.)
- Kenny Ball and his Jazzmen (issued in the US on Kapp)
- Chris Barber's Jazzband (issued in the US on Laurie)
- John Barbirolli and The Hallé Orchestra (from 1956, as Pye Nixa)
- Acker Bilk
- David Bowie (1965–1966; issued in the US on Warner Bros.)
- The Brook Brothers (1961–1964)
- Brotherhood of Man (1975–1979)
- Joe Brown (singer)
- Max Bygraves made a successful series of singalong albums for Pye
- Petula Clark (1957–1971: in addition to dozens of singles, her output for Pye included seventeen albums. Issued in the US on Laurie and then on Warner Bros.)
- Clem Curtis
- Joe Dolan
- Lonnie Donegan (1956–1969; issued in the US on Mercury, on Atlantic, then on Dot)
- Donovan (1965–1971; issued in the US on Hickory and then on Epic)
- Carl Douglas (issued in the US on 20th Century Fox)
- The Dummies (1980)
- Judith Durham
- The Enid
- Episode Six (issued in the US on Elektra for one single only)
- Fabulous Poodles
- Bud Flanagan
- The Flying Machine (1969; issued in the US on Congress and then on Janus)
- Emile Ford and the Checkmates
- The Foundations (issued in the US on Uni)
- Graduate (1979)
- Davy Graham recorded his album The Guitar Player in 1963 under Pye; later reissued by Sanctuary Records in 2003 with eight bonus tracks
- Benny Hill (1961–1965)
- The Honeycombs (1964–1966; issued in the US on Interphon and then on Warner Bros.)
- Idlewild (2006)
- The Ivy League (1965–1966; issued in the US on Cameo)
- Tony Jackson and the Vibrations (1964–1966; issued in the US on Kapp and then on Red Bird)
- Jimmy James & the Vagabonds
- John Paul Jones released "Baja"/"A Foggy Day In Vietnam" on Pye Records in April 1964; issued in US on Parkway
- The Kinks (1964–1971; issued in the US on Cameo and then on Reprise)
- Vera Lynn (1979–1981)
- Man (1968–1969)
- Gerald Masters (1977–1980)
- David MacBeth (1959–1969; includes a spell on subsidiary label Piccadilly)
- Mike McKenzie
- Mungo Jerry (1970–1974; issued in the US on Janus and then on Bell)
- Olivia Newton-John (Olivia, Festival, Australia, 1972)
- Maxine Nightingale
- The Migil 5 (1964–1965)
- Des O'Connor
- Michel Pagliaro (Canadian singer-songwriter from Montreal, simply known as Pagliaro in the UK)
- Lennie Peters (1966)
- Pickettywitch (1969–1973; issued in US on Janus and then on Bell)
- The Real Thing (1976–1979)
- Joan Regan (1960–1961)
- The Remo Four
- Donn Reynolds (1958–1959)
- The Searchers (1963–1967; issued in the US on Mercury, on Liberty and then on Kapp)
- Sandie Shaw (1964–1972; issued in the US on Reprise)
- Labi Siffre (1970–1973, Pye International)
- Hurricane Smith (1976–1977)
- The Sorrows (1964–1966; issued in the US on Warner Bros.)
- Sounds Orchestral (issued in the US on Parkway)
- Status Quo (1968–1971; issued in the US on Cadet Concept and then on Janus)
- Tommy Steele
- Trader Horne
- Frankie Vaughan (1973–1978)
- Johnny Wakelin
- Velvett Fogg (1969)
- Geno Washington & the Ram Jam Band (issued in the US on Kapp)
- Mark Wynter (1962–1968)
- The Human Instinct
- April

Other artists who recorded for Pye during their careers include Jimmy Young, Dickie Valentine, Russ Conway, Emile Ford, Val Doonican, Jackie Trent, Tony Hatch and Tony Hancock.

== 2024 Relaunch ==
The company name and trademark was acquired by the Scottish broadcaster and music producer Tony Currie in September 2024.

The new Pye Records began releasing new albums on vinyl, manufactured by a wind-powered pressing plant in Tranent, with its first release being Race the Sun from the Tony Currie Orchestra, conducted by Gavin Sutherland (principal guest conductor for the English National Ballet), and Callum Au. Race the Sun was conceived to pay tribute to the pop orchestras of the original Pye Records. The revived label also released Harvest Gold by the London-based singer-songwriter Andrea Black.

== See also ==
- Category: Pye Records (albums, singles, artists)
- List of record labels
- Nixa Records
