= Wood Street railway station =

Railway station in Walthamstow, London

Wood Street
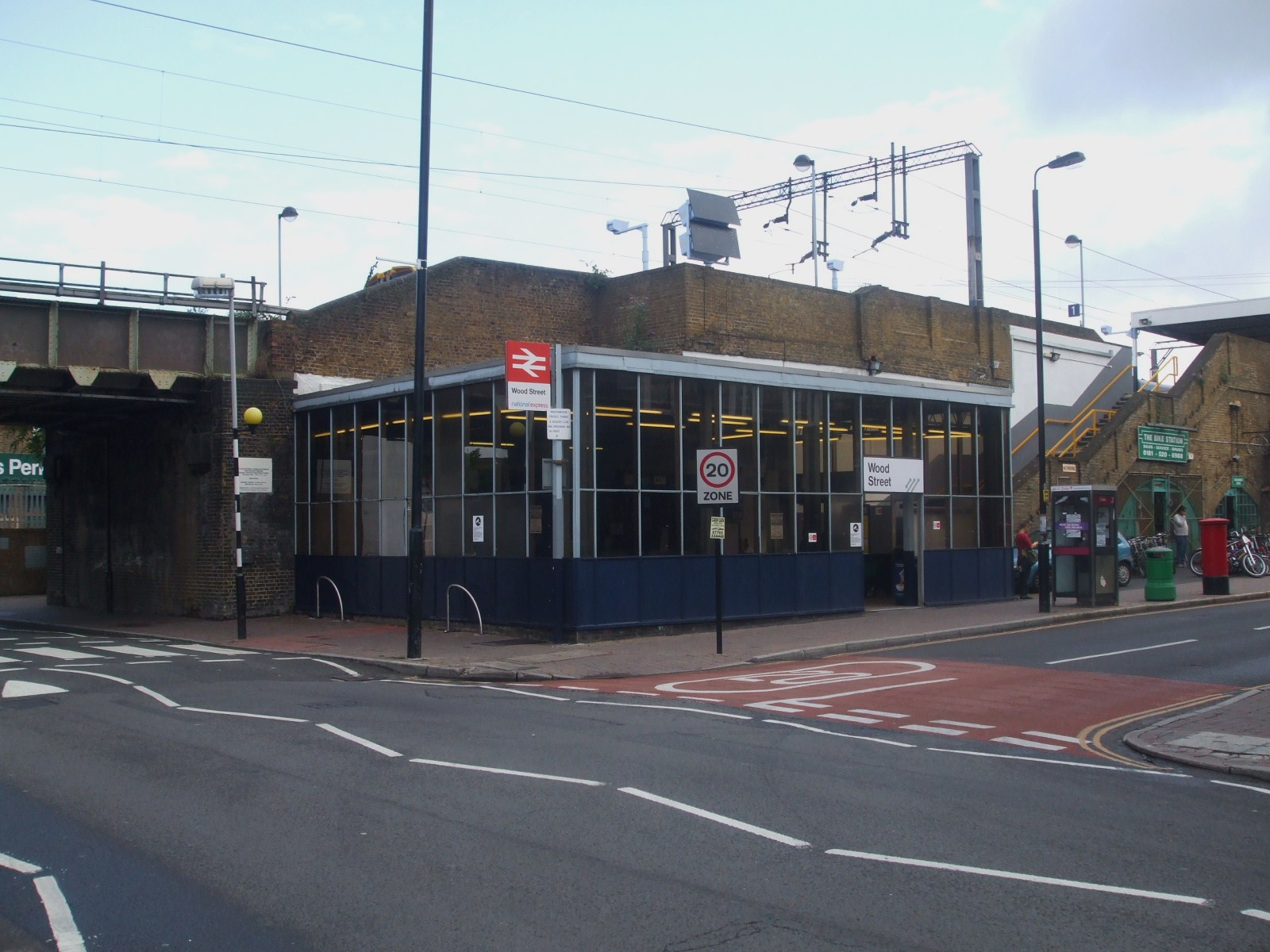
- Main entrance on Upper Walthamstow Road
- Interactive map of Wood Street

General information
- Location: Walthamstow
- Local authority: London Borough of Waltham Forest
- Managed by: London Overground
- Station code: WST
- DfT category: D
- Number of platforms: 2
- Fare zone: 4

National Rail annual entry and exit
- 2020–21: ▼0.549 million
- 2021–22: ▲1.268 million
- 2022–23: ▲1.611 million
- 2023–24: ▲1.933 million
- 2024–25: ▲1.938 million

Key dates
- 17 November 1873: Opened

Other information
- External links: Departures; Facilities
- Coordinates: 51.5864°N 0.0021°W

Wood Street is a station on the Weaver line of the London Overground, located in Upper Walthamstow in the London Borough of Waltham Forest. It is 7 miles 7 chains (11.4 km) down the line from London Liverpool Street on the Chingford branch line. The station is in London fare zone 4, and is situated close to Whipps Cross University Hospital.

Its three-letter station code is WST.

== History ==
The station was opened in 1873 by the Great Eastern Railway.

On 13 February 1919 there was an accident at Wood Street when a passenger train ran into an empty stock train. Five people were injured, none seriously. The cause was a signal failure.

In 1923 the Great Eastern Railway became part of the London and North Eastern Railway, which in turn was merged into British Railways Eastern Region following nationalisation in 1948.

When construction of the London Underground's Victoria line was given parliamentary approval in 1955, the plan was to build the line past Walthamstow Central station to Wood Street, where the line would surface to terminate next to the British Railways station, on land previously used as a coal depot. Before construction work started, a decision was made in 1961 to omit the section beyond Walthamstow Central.

The line was electrified in 1960, and electric services commenced on 12 November. At first Class 305 EMUs were used, but initial technical problems led to their replacement by Class 302 and Class 304 EMUs.

The station had a goods depot, which closed on 6 May 1968.

In April 1994 Railtrack took over responsibility for the operation of the infrastructure. Train services have been operated since then by West Anglia Great Northern, National Express East Anglia, Abellio Greater Anglia and, as of 2015, by London Overground.

=== Engine shed ===
There was an engine shed located just north of Wood Street, which was a sub-shed of Stratford TMD and was built in 1878. The engine shed was a two road affair with space for 6 tank locomotives – there was also a short siding for coal wagons. An additional siding was added c1934. By the 1950s the staff complement was 36 drivers, 36 Firemen and six Passed Cleaners although recruitment for what was a hard dirty job became more difficult during that decade.

On 1 January 1922 the allocation consisted of three GER Class M15 2-4-2Ts (later LNER Class F4), two GER Class C72 (later LNER Class J68) and eleven GER Class S56 (later LNER class J69) 0-6-0T engines.

In later years the main allocation of the shed was tank engines for working suburban services to and from London Liverpool Street and from the 1920s the allocation was exclusively the LNER N7 0-6-2T locomotives.

The shed was closed in 1960 when the line was electrified.

There was a very large fire in July 2026, which caused the railway line to be closed for days.

== Services ==
Trains are operated as part of the Weaver line of the London Overground.

The typical off-peak weekday service pattern is:

- 4 trains per hour (tph) to London Liverpool Street;
- 4 tph to Chingford.

Journey times are 9 minutes to Chingford and 20 minutes to Liverpool Street.

== Connections ==
London Buses routes 230 and W16 serve the station.

Preceding station	London Overground	Following station
Walthamstow Central towards Liverpool Street	Weaver line Lea Valley lines	Highams Park towards Chingford
Abandoned plans
Preceding station	London Underground	Following station
Walthamstow Central towards Victoria	Victoria line	Terminus
