= Highams Park School =

Location
- 34 Handsworth Ave; London, E4 9PJ; England

Information
- Type: Academy
- Motto: 'Success through our Endeavours'
- Established: 1940
- Department for Education URN: 137558 Tables
- Ofsted: Reports
- Head teacher: Nigel Armsby
- Gender: Coeducational
- Age: 11 to 18
- Website: http://www.highamsparkschool.co.uk/

Highams Park School is a mixed secondary school with academy status in Highams Park, London, England. The school has a specialisms in technology and sports.

== History ==
The school, originally named Sidney Burnell School, opened 20 May 1940 as a school for children up to age 14. It became a Secondary modern school in 1944 and a senior high comprehensive school in 1968. The name was changed to the current name around 1968. It became a voluntary aided school in 1999.

== Houses ==
The school has four houses:

- Burnell, named after Sidney Burnell, Director of Education in 1920 and the former name of the school
- Payling, named after Elizabeth Payling, an outstanding academic ex-student who is the Head of Regulation Programme Management at Royal Mail
- Gibson, named after Terry Gibson, an ex-pupil, professional footballer and Sky TV commentator
- Forest, named after Epping Forest, a nearby forest

== Notable former pupils ==
- David Bentley, footballer, (Arsenal, Blackburn, Tottenham)
- Steven Dominique Cheung, Politician, Broadcaster, Torch Bearer for the London 2012 Olympic Games
- Daniel Connolly, musician
- Charlie Daniels, footballer (Tottenham Hotspur, Leyton Orient, Bournemouth)
- Olivia Dean, singer, multi award winner
- Terry Gibson, ex-footballer, (Tottenham, Coventry, Man Utd, Wimbledon)
- Kenzie, former rap performer
- Honey Lantree, drummer, The Honeycombs
- Jamie O'Hara, footballer, (Arsenal, Tottenham, Portsmouth)
- Jermaine Pennant, footballer, (Arsenal, Birmingham, Stoke)
- Abby Rakic-Platt, actress
- Joe Willock, footballer, Newcastle United
- Meg Mills, musician
