= River Ching =

River in Essex, England

Coordinates: 51.6084°N 0.0346°W

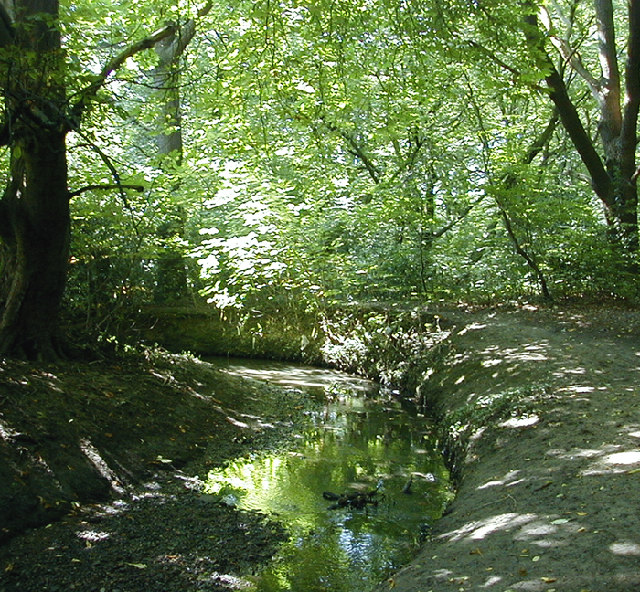

Location
- Country: England

Physical characteristics
- Mouth
  - location: River Lea

The River Ching is a small river which rises in Epping Forest in Essex, and joins the River Lea at Chingford in the London Borough of Waltham Forest.

== Course ==
The Ching originates as a small stream from a spring at the foot of a tree in the southern part of Epping Forest, and flows through woodland and across a ride, coming to the Connaught Water over a fine gravel bed; the flow is not always strong enough to flow continuously to the lake. The Water - which was created by damming the Ching - lies in the parishes of Loughton and Waltham Abbey. Exiting the lake through a sluice, the small river curves towards Rangers Road. Early in this stretch it is joined by the Cuckoo Brook, from Ludgate Plain, northeast of Sewardstonebury, which also takes in a stream from Chingford Plain. Beyond Rangers Road, the Ching flows south and then southwest, to Chingford Hatch, in a semi-woodland setting, and largely in natural banks but with some concrete embankment.

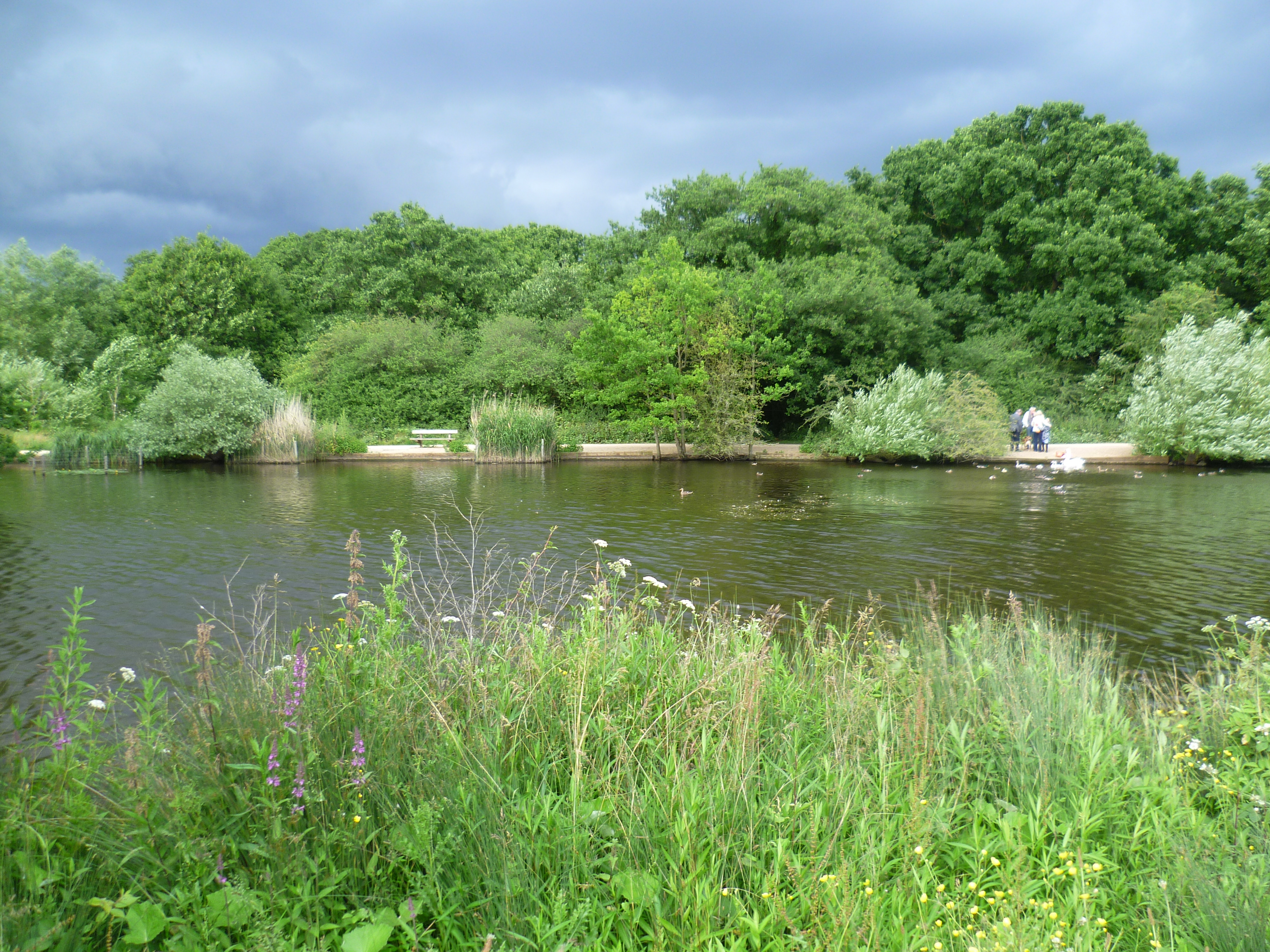
Connaught Water in Epping Forest, formed by damming the river Ching

In the Highams Park area of Chingford, damming of the Ching created a boating lake about two centuries back, on the grounds of a manor house, and as part of a landscape plan by Humphry Repton. Stones from the old London Bridge were used to form the sides of the lake. The river was re-channelled around the lake to the west in 1850, a course it still follows. After this, the Ching bends to the southwest, passing Hale End, and the former greyhound racing venue, Walhamstow Stadium, then meanders broadly west. Turning northwest behind a hotel and a supermarket, it finally runs west under the North Circular Road in a concrete channel, passes a pumping station and enters the River Lea just north of the Banbury Reservoir in South Chingford. At this point, the Lea, its diversion line, and the Lee Navigation, form a complex of channels, all running south. The overall length of the course from the Connaught Water to the Lea is 6 miles (9.5 km).

== Name ==
The river runs through parts of Chingford, but the name of the river is a back-formation from the name of that area, rather than the town being named after the river. It is often marked on maps simply as The Ching and sometimes documented, in whole or in part, as Ching Brook.

== Administration ==
The river lies across multiple local authority boundaries, first forming the border between Essex and the London Borough of Waltham Forest, and later marking the boundary between that Borough and its fellow Borough of Redbridge.

== Pollution ==
The Ching is classified by the Environment Agency as a Heavily Modified Waterbody, and when last studied, while in good condition on chemical standards, was deemed to be only of moderate ecological quality status, with multiple reasons for quality issues identified. In 2009, Thames Water announced a study aimed at reducing pollution of the river in its lower reaches caused by domestic waste water from sinks, showers, dishwashers, and washing machines.

== Droughts and risks of flooding ==
The River Ching is a flashy river that is prone to heavy rainfall. In summer 2022 the clay bed of the river was very dry, in August 2022 heavy rain caused the worst flooding in 60 years. The land was baked hard and could not absorb the water so it drained into the river.

As of August 2026, the river Ching has dried up completely between Connaught Water and Whitehall Road, the first time this has happened since 1976.
