= Church End (Redbridge ward) =

Electoral ward in the London Borough of Redbridge

- Former electoral ward for the Redbridge London Borough Council
- Church End ward boundaries from 2002 to 2018
- Borough: Redbridge
- County: Greater London
- Population: 11,516 (2011)
- Electorate: 9,126 (2014)

Former electoral ward
- Created: 1978
- Abolished: 2018
- Councillors: 3
- Replaced by: Churchfields, South Woodford
- GSS code: E05000499

Church End was an electoral ward in the London Borough of Redbridge from 1978 to 2018. The ward was first used in the 1978 elections and last used for the 2014 elections. It returned councillors to Redbridge London Borough Council. Church End was replaced with the new wards of Churchfields and South Woodford.

== 2002–2018 Redbridge council elections ==
There was a revision of ward boundaries in Redbridge in 2002.

=== 2014 election ===
The election took place on 22 May 2014.

2014 Redbridge London Borough Council election: Church End
Party	Candidate	Votes	%	±%
Turnout				
	Liberal Democrats hold	Swing		
	Conservative gain from Liberal Democrats	Swing		
	Conservative gain from Liberal Democrats	Swing		

=== 2010 election ===
The election on 6 May 2010 took place on the same day as the United Kingdom general election.

2010 Redbridge London Borough Council election: Church End
Party	Candidate	Votes	%	±%
Liberal Democrats	Hugh Cleaver	2,972		
Liberal Democrats	Richard Hoskins	2,885		
Liberal Democrats	Nicola Sinclair	2,771		
Conservative	Iseult Roche	1,700		
Conservative	Lilette Ebrahimkahn	1,605		
Conservative	Rashid Ebrahimkahn	1,522		
Labour	Peter Bradley	974		
Labour	Paul Daintry	873		
Labour	David Lee	853		
Green	Theresa Reynolds	453		
Turnout			67.49	+24.79
Liberal Democrats hold		Swing		
Liberal Democrats hold		Swing		
Liberal Democrats hold		Swing		

=== 2006 election ===
The election took place on 4 May 2006.

2006 Redbridge London Borough Council election: Church End
Party	Candidate	Votes	%	±%
Liberal Democrats	Richard Hoskins	1,978	55.1	
Liberal Democrats	Hugh Cleaver	1,912		
Liberal Democrats	Nicola Sinclair	1,798		
Conservative	Mark Dunn	936	26.1	
Conservative	Nigel Colman	815		
Conservative	Marie Ebrahimkhan	770		
Labour	Beverley Brewer	350	9.8	
Green	Theresa Reynolds	323	9.0	
Labour	Royston Emmett	295		
Labour	Taifur Rashid	248		
Turnout			42.7	
Liberal Democrats hold		Swing		
Liberal Democrats hold		Swing		
Liberal Democrats hold		Swing		

=== 2002 election ===
The election took place on 2 May 2002.

2002 Redbridge London Borough Council election: Church End
Party	Candidate	Votes	%	±%
Liberal Democrats	Maureen Hoskins	1,448	19.0	
Liberal Democrats	Hugh Cleaver	1,417	18.6	
Liberal Democrats	Richard Hoksins	1,407	18.4	
Conservative	Mark Dunn	813	10.6	
Conservative	Nicholas Hayes	785	10.3	
Conservative	Anthony Lenaghan	731	9.6	
Labour	Julia Hughes	354	4.6	
Labour	Shalab Baig	336	4.4	
Labour	Andrew Walker	322	4.2	
Total votes		7613	100	
Turnout			32.9	
Liberal Democrats win (new boundaries)				
Liberal Democrats win (new boundaries)				
Liberal Democrats win (new boundaries)				

== 1978–2002 Redbridge council elections ==
=== 1998 election ===
The election took place on 7 May 1998.

=== 1994 election ===
The election took place on 5 May 1994.

1994 Redbridge London Borough Council election: Church End
Party	Candidate	Votes	%	±%
Turnout				
	Liberal Democrats hold	Swing		
	Liberal Democrats hold	Swing		
	Liberal Democrats hold	Swing		

=== 1990 election ===
The election took place on 3 May 1990.

1990 Redbridge London Borough Council election: Church End
Party	Candidate	Votes	%	±%
Lib Dem Focus Team	Maureen Hoskins	1,945	46.48	
Lib Dem Focus Team	Richard Hoskins	1,762		
Lib Dem Focus Team	Hugh Cleaver	1,715		
Conservative	Leslie Bridgeman	1,549	39.51	
Conservative	Morris Hickey	1,547		
Conservative	Philippa Stone	1,513		
Labour	Peter Bradley	578	14.01	
Labour	Susan Kean	545		
Labour	Simon Green	511		
Registered electors		7,607		
Turnout		4,031	52.99	
Rejected ballots		6	0.15	
Lib Dem Focus Team gain from Conservative		Swing		
Lib Dem Focus Team gain from Conservative		Swing		
Lib Dem Focus Team hold		Swing		

=== 1986 election ===
The election took place on 8 May 1986.

1986 Redbridge London Borough Council election: Church End
Party	Candidate	Votes	%	±%
Turnout				
	Conservative hold	Swing		
	Conservative hold	Swing		
	Alliance gain from Conservative	Swing		

=== 1982 election ===
The election took place on 6 May 1982.

1982 Redbridge London Borough Council election: Church End
Party	Candidate	Votes	%	±%
Turnout				
	Conservative hold	Swing		
	Conservative hold	Swing		
	Conservative hold	Swing		

=== 1978 election ===
The election took place on 4 May 1978.

1978 Redbridge London Borough Council election: Church End
Party	Candidate	Votes	%	±%
Turnout				
	Conservative win (new seat)			
	Conservative win (new seat)			
	Conservative win (new seat)			
