= Interphon Records =

- Parent company: Vee-Jay Records
- Founded: 1964
- Status: Inactive
- Genre: Various
- Country of origin: United States

Interphon Records was a sub-label from Vee-Jay Records to distribute its European-leased masters in the US. It was active from 1964 until 1965.

The U.S. release of The Honeycombs 1964 hit "Have I the Right?" was released on Interphon.

== See also ==
- List of record labels
