= The Honeycombs =

English pop group

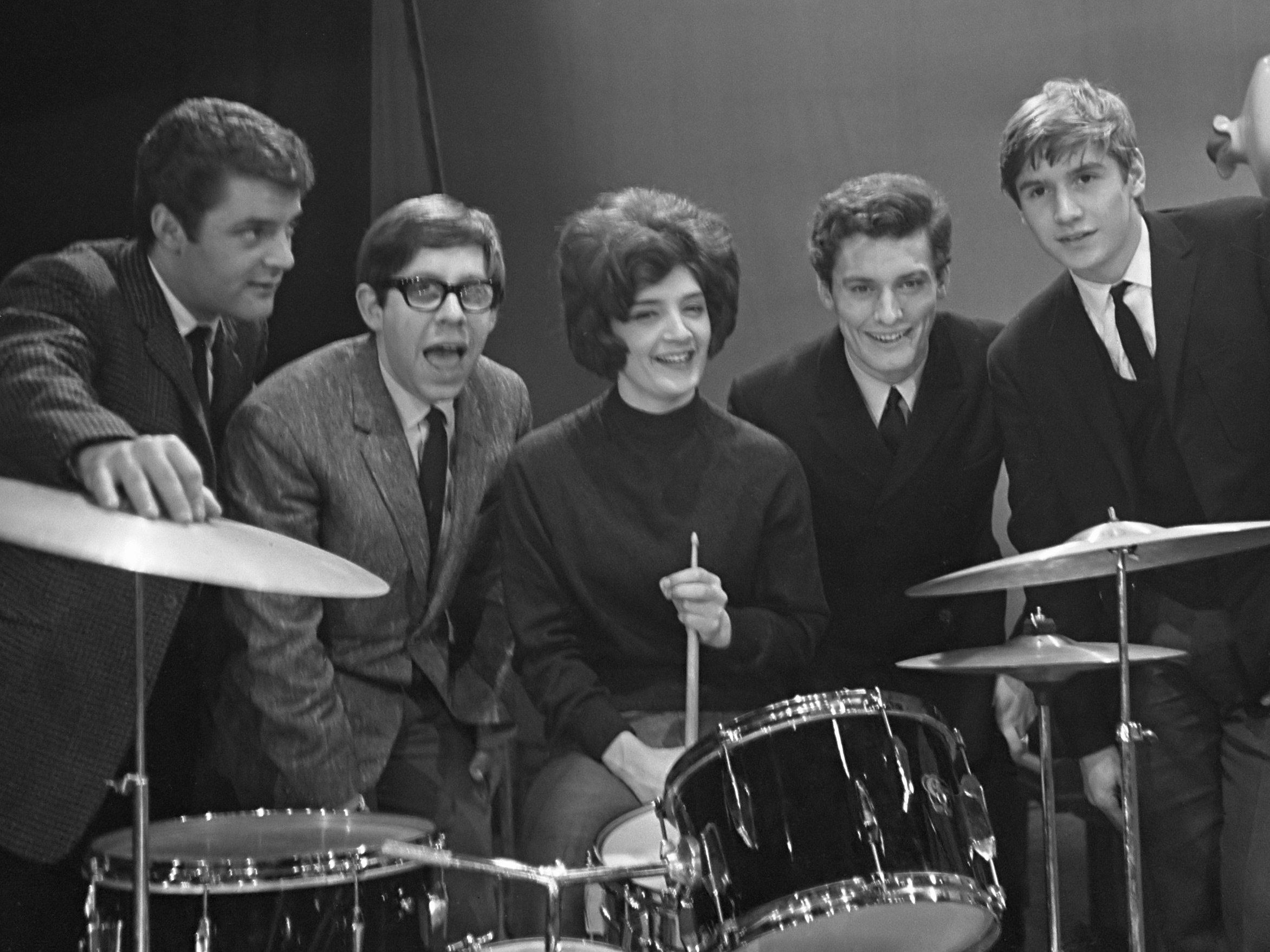
- The Honeycombs in Rotterdam, 1964 (l-r): John Lantree, Martin Murray, Honey Lantree, Denis D'Ell, Alan Ward

Background information
- Origin: London, England
- Genres: Beat; pop; rock and roll
- Years active: 1963–1967; 2004–present
- Labels: Pye (UK); Interphon, Warner (US)
- Past members: Denis D'Ell; Honey Lantree; John Lantree; Martin Murray; Alan Ward; Peter Pye; Colin Boyd; Rod Butler; Eddy Spence

The Honeycombs were an English group founded in 1963 in north London. They had a chart-topping, million-selling 1964 hit, "Have I the Right?". The band featured Honey Lantree on drums, one of the few high-profile female drummers at that time. They were unable to replicate the success of their first single and disbanded by 1967.

== Personnel ==
The original group members were:

- Denis D'Ell (born Denis James Dalziel, 10 October 1943, Whitechapel, east London; died of cancer 6 July 2005) – lead vocals and harmonica player.
- Martin Murray (born 7 October 1941, the East End of London) – rhythm guitar. He was replaced by Peter Pye (born 12 July 1946, Walthamstow, London) in November 1964.
- Alan Ward (born 12 December 1945, Nottingham, Nottinghamshire) – lead guitar.
- John Lantree (born John David Lantree, 20 August 1941, Newbury, Berkshire) – bass guitar.
- Honey Lantree (born Anne Margot Lantree, 28 August 1943, Hayes, Middlesex; died 23 December 2018) – drums and vocals.

== Career ==
The group was founded as an amateur band by Martin Murray in November 1963. Its members were Murray (a hairdresser), his salon assistant Anne "Honey" Lantree, her brother John, and two friends. Originally, they called themselves the Sheratons.

The group played dates in the West End of London, and at the Mildmay Tavern, a north London pub. Among those attending a February 1964 performance by the band were aspiring songwriters Ken Howard and Alan Blaikley. Howard and Blaikley would become a prolific British songwriting team, but in 1964, they had just started their career. They got into conversation with the group, who appeared interested in a few songs the duo had just written. The group had already arranged an audition with indie record producer Joe Meek, which resulted in a recording of Howard and Blaikley's "Have I the Right?" Meek himself provided the B-side, "Please Don't Pretend Again".

Meek used his apartment, at 304 Holloway Road, Islington, as a recording studio. Three UK No. 1 hits were produced there: "Johnny Remember Me" by John Leyton, "Telstar" by The Tornados, and "Have I the Right?"

Conspicuous in "Have I the Right?" is the prominence of the drums, whose effect was enhanced by members of the group stamping their feet on the wooden stairs to the studio. Meek recorded the effect with five microphones fixed to the banisters with bicycle clips. For the finishing touch, someone beat a tambourine directly onto a microphone. The recording was also somewhat sped up.

"Have I the Right?" was released on 26 June 1964 on the Pye record label. Louis Benjamin, later Pye's chairman, renamed the group as "The Honeycombs", a pun on the drummer's name and her job as a hairdresser's assistant. The sales started slowly, but by the end of July, the record started to climb the UK Singles Chart. Honey Lantree's status as a female drummer in a top band was as unusual then as it is now, and some questioned whether she was just a visual novelty, despite her genuine drumming ability. At the end of August, the record reached No. 1. "Have I the Right?" was also a big success outside the UK, hitting No. 1 in Australia and Canada, No. 3 in Ireland, No. 5 in the US, and No. 2 in the Netherlands. Overall sales of the record reached a million. The Honeycombs also recorded a German version of the song: "Hab ich das Recht?" Both the English and the German versions reached No. 21 in the German charts: the English one in October, the German one in November 1964.

From then on, Howard and Blaikley acted as the group's managers and also wrote their next singles, "Is It Because" and "Eyes", which did not sell well. This also applied to their fourth single, "Something Better Beginning", written by Ray Davies from the Kinks.

Soon after their first record had become a hit, the Honeycombs went on tour to the Far East and Australia, and were not able to promote their new records at home. The tour gained them a long-lasting popularity in Japan, however. Especially for the Japanese market, the group produced a live album and a single, "Love in Tokyo". The group also made a lasting impression in Sweden, where they scored two No. 1 singles.

The Honeycombs made many appearances on music television shows such as Top of the Pops, Ready Steady Go! (UK), Shindig! (US), and Beat-Club (Germany). The group also appeared in the 1965 film Pop Gear, miming "Have I the Right?" and "Eyes".

In July 1965, British music magazine NME reported that it had been agreed in the London High Court that "Have I the Right?" was the work of Howard and Blaikley. Composer Geoff Goddard agreed to drop allegations that he, not they, had written the song.

In August 1965, the group released "That's the Way", with Honey Lantree sharing vocals with D'Ell (when on tour, Viv Prince of The Pretty Things took over the drumming). This record became their fourth British hit and reached No. 12. Its successor, "This Year Next Year", again with Lantree and D'Ell sharing vocals, did not reach the UK chart.

D'Ell sang on all but the last single the group recorded. "Who Is Sylvia?" was an adaptation of Franz Schubert's song "An Sylvia". "It's So Hard" was also recorded by Dave Dee, Dozy, Beaky, Mick & Tich as "Hard to Love You".

In April 1966, Denis D'Ell, Alan Ward, and Peter Pye left the group.

In 1999, the original lineup (except Martin Murray) reformed to work with cult record producer Russell C. Brennan, who they likened to Joe Meek. He produced a new version of "Live and Let Die" for the band, which featured on the Future Legend Records release Cult Themes From the 70s Vol. 2 album. To promote the song, they did their first live gig together in 30 years at Madame Jo Jo's in London before disbanding once more. This stands as the original lineup's last recording. The track was also featured on a special James Bond compilation, The Themes Bond... James Bond (The Alternative James Bond Themes).

== The (new) Honeycombs and afterwards ==
The group went on, with a new lead singer, guitarist and keyboardist:

- Colin Boyd (born Colin Nicholas Nicol, 4 June 1946, Combe, near Bath, Somerset) – guitar and vocals. Later, he formed Honeybus and changed his name to Colin Hare.
- Rod Butler (born Rodney Butler, 27 May 1944, Mill Hill, London) – lead guitar and vocals. Later, he played with the Lemmings and then The College Boys, formed by ex-Honeycomb Martin Murray. Butler later joined forces with D'Ell to form Zarabanda and played in Violinski with Mik Kaminski of ELO.
- Eddy Spence – keyboards and vocals.
- John Lantree – bass guitar.
- Honey Lantree – drums and vocals.

This line-up released the group's last single, "That Loving Feeling", a group original penned by new lead singer Colin Boyd. It failed to chart.

Late in the year, the Honeycombs toured Japan and recorded a live LP in Tokyo. The original vinyl LP is hard to locate these days, as is the 1990s CD re-issue by Repertoire Records (Rep 4180-WZ). The full tracklist is:

- "Colour Slide" / "I'll Go Crazy" / "She's About a Mover" / "There's Always Me" / "Wipe Out" / "Lucille" / "If You Should" / "Have I the Right?" / "Goldfinger" / "Kansas City" / "My Prayer" / "What'd I Say"

A few of these tracks have made their way onto video streaming sites, including an extremely rare Japanese-only Christmas single recorded during their tour of that country, coupling "Santa Claus Is Back in Town" with "Silent Night".

On 3 February 1967, Joe Meek committed suicide at his recording studio/flat on Holloway Road, after an altercation with his landlady, whom he had shot dead. After this, the Honeycombs had no more records issued and the band broke up.

In 1972, Peter Pye, using an alteration of his middle name Frank, started a brief solo career as Peter Franc, with a single for Blue Mountain label, though both compositions were credited to Peter F. Pye. It was followed by two albums and three singles for the Dawn label, the latest being a 1975 non-album single.

In the 1990s, founding member Martin Murray toured the cabaret circuit with a group called Martin Murray's Honeycombs. Another line-up, including Honey Lantree, Peter Pye, and Denis D'Ell, also successfully toured from 1991 onwards; John Lantree later rejoined this line-up. In 1999, record producer Russell C. Brennan asked D'Ell, the Lantrees, and Pye to record "Live and Let Die", on the Future Legend Records compilation, Cult Themes from the '70s Vol. 2. This compilation also featured Glenda Collins, another Joe Meek artist.

Singer Dennis D'Ell died on 6 July 2005, at the age of 61. The drummer, Honey Lantree, died on 23 December 2018, aged 75.

== Discography ==
=== Singles ===
Year	Single	Peak chart positions										
Year	Single	AUS	CAN	FIN	GER	IRE	NL	NOR	NZ	SWE	UK	US
1964	"Have I the Right?" b/w "Please Don't Pretend Again"	1	1	20	21	3	3	7	1	1	1	5
1964	"Hab' Ich Das Recht" (Only released in Germany) b/w "Du sollst nicht traurig sein"	—	—	—	21	—	—	—	—	—	—	—
1964	"Is It Because?" b/w "I'll Cry Tomorrow"	67	—	—	—	—	—	—	—	—	38	—
1964	"I Can't Stop" (Not released in the UK) b/w "I'll Cry Tomorrow" (US & Canada); "Colour Slide" (Netherlands); "How the Mighty Have Fallen" (everywhere else)	43	37	—	—	—	—	—	—	—	—	48
1964	"Eyes" b/w "If You've Got to Pick a Baby"	—	—	—	—	—	—	—	—	—	—	—
1965	"She's Too Way Out" (Only released in Scandinavia) b/w "That's the Way"	—	—	— 7	—	—	—	—	—	— 1	—	—
1965	"I Don't Love You No More" (Withdrawn from release in the UK) b/w "I'll See You Tomorrow"	—	—	—	—	—	—	—	—	—	—	—
1965	"Color Slide" (Only released in the US and Japan) b/w "That's the Way"	—	—	—	—	—	—	—	—	—	—	—
1965	"Something Better Beginning" b/w "I'll See You Tomorrow"	—	—	—	—	—	—	—	—	—	39	—
1965	"That's the Way" b/w "Can't Get Through to You"	—	—	—	—	—	—	—	—	—	12	—
1965	"This Year, Next Year..." b/w "Not Sleeping Too Well Lately"	—	—	—	—	—	—	—	—	—	—	—
1965	"Santa Claus Is Backin to Town" (Only released in Japan) b/w "Silent Night, Holy Night"	—	—	—	—	—	—	—	—	—	—	—
1965	"Love in Tokyo" (Only released in Japan) b/w "Goldfinger"	—	—	—	—	—	—	—	—	—	—	—
1965	"Hurricane" (Only released in Japan) b/w "Music Train"	—	—	—	—	—	—	—	—	—	—	—
1966	"Who Is Sylvia?" b/w "How WIll I Know?"	—	—	—	—	—	—	—	—	—	—	—
1966	"If You Should" (Only released in Japan) b/w "All Systems Go"	—	—	—	—	—	—	—	—	—	—	—
1966	"It's So Hard" b/w "I Fell in Love"	—	—	—	—	—	—	—	—	—	—	—
1966	"That Loving Feeling" b/w "Should a Man Cry"	—	—	—	—	—	—	—	—	—	—	—
"—" denotes releases that did not chart or were not released

=== Albums ===
- The Honeycombs (Released in the US as Here Are the Honeycombs – US No. 147) (UK Pye NPL 18097 / US Interphon IN-88001, 25 September 1964):
  - "Colour Slide" / "Once You Know" / "Without You It Is Night" / "That's the Way" / "I Want to Be Free" / "How the Mighty Have Fallen" / "Have I the Right?" / "Just a Face in the Crowd" / "Nice While It Lasted" / "Me from You" / "Leslie Anne" / "She's Too Way Out" / "It Ain't Necessarily So" / "This Too Shall Pass Away"
- All Systems Go! (Pye NPL 18132, 17 December 1965):
  - "I Can't Stop" / "Don't Love Her No More" / "All Systems Go" / "Totem Pole" / "Emptiness" / "Ooee Train" / "She Ain't Coming Back" / "Something I Gotta Tell You" / "Our Day Will Come" / "Nobody But Me" / "There's Always Me" / "Love in Tokyo" / "If You Should" / "My Prayer"
- In Tokyo (Nippon Columbia PS-1277, 17 November 1965) (Live album; Japan only):
  - "Colour Slide" / "I'll Go Crazy" / "She's About a Mover" / "There's Always Me" / "Wipe Out" / "Lucille" / "If You Should" / "Have I the Right?" / "Goldfinger" / "Kansas City" / "My Prayer" / "What'd I Say"

In Germany, all three Honeycombs albums have been reissued on compact disc, two of which had bonus tracks:

- The Honeycombs (Repertoire Records RR 4098-WZ, 1990):
  - Bonus tracks: "Please Don't Pretend Again" / "I'll Cry Tomorrow" / "If You've Got to Pick a Baby" / "I'll See You Tomorrow" / "I Can't Stop" / "Hab ich das Recht" / "Du Sollst Nicht Traurig Sein"
- All Systems – Go! (Repertoire Records, RR 4121-WZ, 1990):
  - Bonus tracks: "Not Sleeping Too Well Lately" / "How Will I Know?" / "I Fell in Love" / "Something Better Beginning" / "Should a Man Cry?" / "Can't Get Through to You"
- In Tokyo (Repertoire Records, REP 4180-WZ, 1991)

=== Compilation albums ===
- The Best of the Honeycombs (PRT Records PYC 4009, 1988):
  - "Have I the Right?" / "Is It Because?" / "Eyes" / "I Don't Love Her No More" / "Something Better Beginning" / "That's the Way" / "This Year Next Year" / "Who Is Sylvia?" / "It's So Hard" / "That Loving Feeling" / "How the Mighty Have Fallen" / "I Want to Be Free" / "I Can't Stop" / "Love in Tokyo"
- Honeycombs (All Systems Go and It's the Honeycombs) (Sequel Records NEX CD 125, 1990):
  - "Colour Slide" / "Once You Know" / "Without You It Is Night" / "That's the Way" / "I Want to Be Free" / "How the Mighty Have Fallen" / "Have I the Right?" / "Just a Face in the Crowd" / "Nice While It Lasted" / "Me from You" / "Leslie Anne" / "She's Too Way Out" / "It Ain't Necessarily So" / "This Too Shall Pass Away" / "I Can't Stop" / "Don't Love Her No More" / "All Systems Go" / "Totem Pole" / "Emptiness" / "Ooee Train" / "She Ain't Coming Back" / "Something I Gotta Tell You" / "Our Day Will Come" / "Nobody But Me" / "There's Always Me" / "Love in Tokyo" / "If You Should" / "My Prayer"
- The Best of the Honeycombs (Marble Arch CMA CD 146, 1991):
  - "Have I the Right?" / "Leslie Anne" / "Once You Know" / "That's the Way" / "Colour Slide" / "Without You It Is Night" / "Something Better Beginning" / "I Want to Be Free" / "Just a Face in the Crowd" / "How the Mighty Have Fallen" / "Nice While It Lasted" / "She's Too Way Out"
- The Best of the Honeycombs, Produced By Joe Meek (EMI EMI CDEMS 1475, 1993):
  - "Have I the Right?" / "Can't Get Through to You" / "I Want to Be Free" / "Leslie Anne" / "Colour Slide" / "This Year Next Year" / "That Lovin' Feeling" / "That's the Way" / "It Ain't Necessarily So" / "How the Mighty Have Fallen" / "I'll Cry Tomorrow" / "I'll See You Tomorrow" / "Is It Because" / "She's Too Way Out" / "Something Better Beginning" / "Eyes" / "Just a Face in the Crowd" / "Nice While It Lasted" / "It's So Hard" / "I Can't Stop" / "I Don't Love Her No More" / "All Systems Go" / "Totem Pole" / "Emptiness" / "Ooee Train" / "She Ain't Coming Back" / "Something I Gotta Tell You" / "Nobody But Me" / "There's Always Me" / "Love in Tokyo"
- Have I the Right?: The Very Best of the Honeycombs (EMI 7243 5 38312 2 6, 2002):
  - "Have I the Right?" / "That's the Way" / "Is it Because" / "Something Better Beginning" / "Colour Slide" / "Once You Know" / "Without You It Is Night" / "I Want to Be Free" / "It Ain't Necessarily So" / "Our Day Will Come" / "I'll See You Tomorrow" / "Eyes" / "Can't Get Through to You" / "It's So Hard" / "She's Too Way Out" / "I Can't Stop" / "Ooee Train" / "Love in Tokyo" / "Totem Pole" / "My Prayer"
- 304 Holloway Road Revisited (2016):
  - Musicians: Martin Murray, Mik West, Zak Skjerdal, Ant Atkins, Allan Gifford, Linda Hall.
  - "Leslie Anne" / "Mary Jo" / "Bring Your Heart With You" / "Please Don't Pretend Again" / "It's Crazy But I Can't Stop" / "That's the Way" / "Love in Tokyo" / "Have I the Right?" / "Colour Slide" / "Without You It's Night" / "It's So Hard to Love You" / "Something I Got to Tell You" / "Totem Pole 9 (Theme from Howards' Way)" / "Too Way Out"

== See also ==
- List of artists who reached number one on the UK singles chart
- List of 1960s one-hit wonders in the United States
- List of performers on Top of the Pops
- List of artists who reached number one on the Australian singles chart

== Bibliography ==
- Chris May and Tim Phillips, British Beat, Sociopack Publications, London, [1974], p. 75.
