= Hatch Lane =

Electoral ward in Waltham Forest, England

Coordinates: 51.628°N 0.021°E

- Former electoral ward for the Waltham Forest London Borough Council
- Hatch Lane ward boundaries from 2002 to 2022
- Borough: Waltham Forest
- County: Greater London
- Population: 11,058 (2011)
- Electorate: 8,543 (2018)
- Major settlements: Chingford Hatch, Friday Hill

Former electoral ward
- Created: 1978
- Abolished: 2022
- Councillors: 3
- Replaced by: Hatch Lane and Highams Park North
- GSS code: E05000598

Hatch Lane was an electoral ward in the London Borough of Waltham Forest from 1978 to 2022. The ward was first used in the 1978 elections and last used for the 2018 elections, with a final by-election in 2021. It returned three councillors to Waltham Forest London Borough Council. The ward covered the Chingford Hatch and Friday Hill areas of Chingford.

The population of the ward of the ward at the 2011 Census was 11,058.

== 2002 to 2022 Waltham Forest council elections ==
There was a revision of ward boundaries in Waltham Forest in 2002.

=== 2021 by-election ===
The by-election took place on 6 May 2021, following the death of Geoff Walker.

2021 Hatch Lane by-election
Party	Candidate	Votes	%	±%
Conservative	Justin Halabi	2,072	50.9	+3.2
Labour	Catherine Burns	1,565	38.4	+2.3
Green	Robert Tatam	266	6.5	−3.4
Liberal Democrats	Henry Boyle	170	4.2	−2.0
Majority		507	12.4	
Turnout		4,073		
Conservative hold		Swing		

=== 2018 election ===
The election took place on 3 May 2018.

2018 Waltham Forest London Borough Council election: Hatch Lane
Party	Candidate	Votes	%	±%
Conservative	Marion Fitzgerald	1,768	49.6	
Conservative	Geoff Walker	1,739	48.8	
Conservative	Tim James	1,709	48.0	
Labour Co-op	Lesley Anne Finlayson	1,338	37.5	
Labour Co-op	Liz Fenton	1,309	36.7	
Labour Co-op	Jenny Lennox	1,287	36.1	
Green	Rosemary Green	367	10.3	
Green	Michael Holloway	279	7.8	
Green	Rebecca Redwood	272	7.6	
Liberal Democrats	Ted Cooke	231	6.5	
Turnout			41.84%	
Majority		371		
Conservative hold		Swing		
Conservative hold		Swing		
Conservative hold		Swing		

=== 2014 election ===
The election took place on 22 May 2014.

2014 Waltham Forest London Borough Council election: Hatch Lane
Party	Candidate	Votes	%	±%
Conservative	Marion Fitzgerald	1,485	18%	
Conservative	Geoffrey Walker	1,249	15%	
Conservative	Tim James	1,134	14%	
Labour	Stephen Garrett	935	11%	
UKIP	Paul Hillman	868	11%	
Labour	Graham Smith	743	9%	
Labour	Nicholas Russell	741	9%	
Green	Robert Tatam	575	7%	
Liberal Democrats	Marc Jones	252	3%	
TUSC	Sue Wills	152	2%	
Turnout		8,134		
Conservative hold		Swing		
Conservative hold		Swing		
Conservative hold		Swing		
