= Hatch Lane and Highams Park North =

- Electoral ward for the Waltham Forest London Borough Council
- Hatch Lane and Highams Park North ward boundaries since 2022
- Borough: Waltham Forest
- County: Greater London
- Population: 12,951 (2021) (Note: 2021 Census data reported for 2022 ward boundaries)
- Electorate: 9,554 (2022)
- Area: 2.754 square kilometres (1.063 sq mi)

Current electoral ward
- Created: 2022
- Number of members: 3
- Councillors: Marion Fitzgerald; Justin Halabi; Tim James
- Created from: Hale End and Highams Park, Hatch Lane
- GSS code: E05013890

Hatch Lane and Highams Park North is an electoral ward in the London Borough of Waltham Forest. The ward was first used in the 2022 elections. It returns three councillors to Waltham Forest London Borough Council.

== List of councillors ==
Term	Councillor	Party
2022–present	Marion Fitzgerald (Note: Marion Fitzgerald changed parties in 2026.)	Conservative
2022–present	Marion Fitzgerald	Reform
2022–present	Justin Halabi (Note: Justin Halabi changed parties in 2025.)	Conservative
2022–present	Justin Halabi	Reform
2022–present	Tim James (Note: Tim James changed parties in 2026.)	Conservative
2022–present	Tim James	Reform

== Waltham Forest council elections ==
=== 2022 election ===
The election took place on 5 May 2022. The three winning candidates were sitting councillors for the predecessor Hatch Lane ward.

2022 Waltham Forest London Borough Council election: Hatch Lane and Highams Park North
Party	Candidate	Votes	%	±%
Conservative	Marion Fitzgerald	1,732	52.3	
Conservative	Justin Halabi	1,651	49.8	
Conservative	Tim James	1,618	48.9	
Labour	Catherine Burns	1,561	47.1	
Labour	Daniel Fryd	1,328	40.1	
Labour	Zia Rehman	1,264	38.2	
Green	Robert Tatam	623	18.8	
TUSC	Louise Cuffaro	159	4.8	
Turnout			37.1	
Conservative win (new seat)				
Conservative win (new seat)				
Conservative win (new seat)				
