= Highams Park railway station =

London Overground station

Highams Park
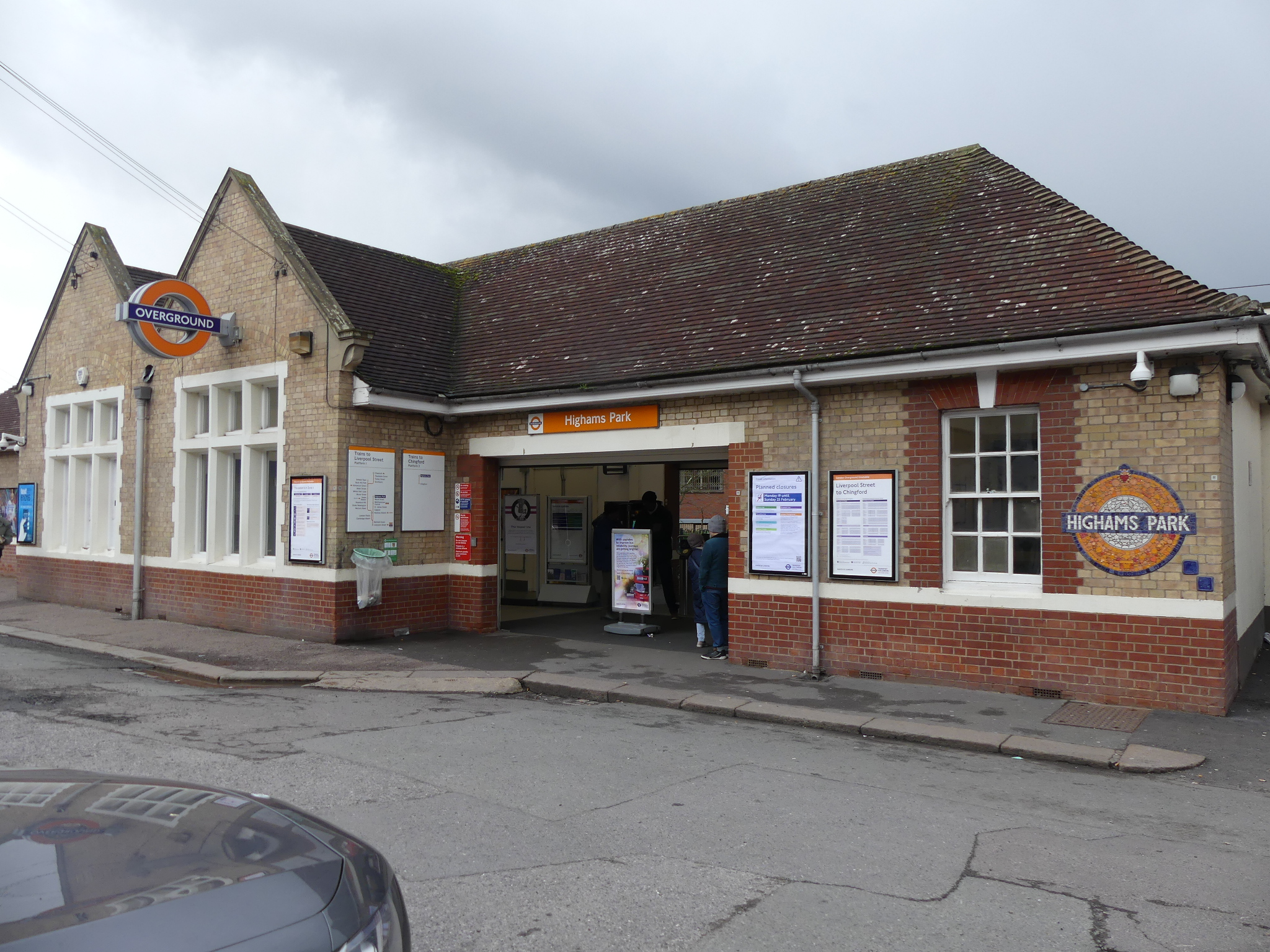
- Interactive map of Highams Park

General information
- Location: Highams Park
- Local authority: London Borough of Waltham Forest
- Managed by: London Overground
- Station code: HIP
- DfT category: C2
- Number of platforms: 2
- Accessible: Yes
- Fare zone: 4

National Rail annual entry and exit
- 2020–21: ▼0.788 million
- 2021–22: ▲1.828 million
- 2022–23: ▲2.259 million
- 2023–24: ▲2.730 million
- 2024–25: ▲2.738 million

Key dates
- 17 November 1873: Opened

Other information
- External links: Departures; Facilities
- Coordinates: 51.6084°N 0.0001°W

Highams Park is a railway station on the Chingford branch of the Lea Valley lines, located in Highams Park in the London Borough of Waltham Forest. It is 8 miles 52 chains (13.9 km) down the line from London Liverpool Street and is situated between Wood Street and Chingford. It has been operated by London Overground since 2015.

== History ==
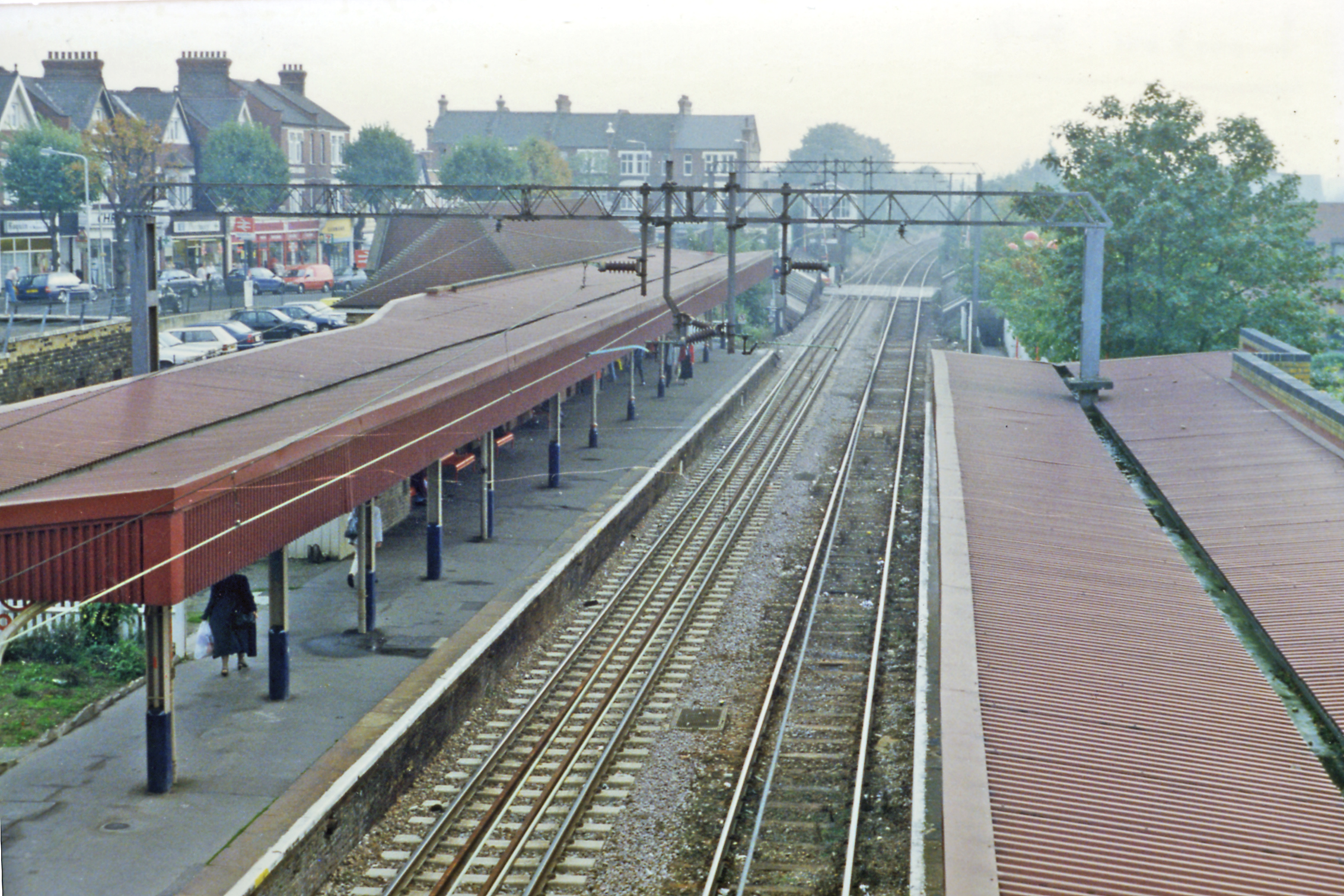
The station in 1995

The station was originally named "Hale End" upon opening on 17 November 1873, and was renamed on 1 October 1894 as Highams Park. On 1 May 1899, it was again renamed to Highams Park & Hale End, before changing to its current name on 20 February 1969.

The station had a goods yard to transport milk and Xylonite by the 1890s, which closed in 1965.

The present station, to the design of Neville Ashbee, was inaugurated in 1903, according to a plaque at the station.

== Facilities ==
The station is staffed the majority of the day, and has full step-free access. There are waiting shelters, ticket machines, departure and information screens, a car park and bicycle storage.

== Passenger volume ==
Passenger Volume at Highams Park
| | 2002–03 | 2004–05 | 2005–06 | 2006–07 | 2007–08 | 2008–09 | 2009–10 | 2010–11 | 2011–12 | 2012–13 | 2013–14 | 2014–15 | 2015–16 | 2016–17 | 2017–18 | 2018–19 | 2019–20 | 2020–21 | 2021–22 | 2022–23 |
|---|---|---|---|---|---|---|---|---|---|---|---|---|---|---|---|---|---|---|---|---|
| Entries and exits | 1,279,429 | 1,220,851 | 1,091,726 | 1,671,640 | 1,726,941 | 1,591,470 | 1,464,612 | 1,553,296 | 1,646,330 | 1,664,538 | 1,822,878 | 1,998,106 | 2,116,016 | 2,358,214 | 2,503,850 | 2,817,380 | 2,679,244 | 788,376 | 1,828,440 | 2,258,850 |

The statistics cover twelve month periods that start in April.

== Services ==
Trains are operated by London Overground (before 2015, services were operated by Abellio Greater Anglia). The typical off-peak weekday service pattern is:

- 4 trains per hour (tph) to London Liverpool Street;
- 4 tph to Chingford.

| Preceding station | London Overground | Following station |
|---|---|---|
| Wood Street towards Liverpool Street | Weaver line Lea Valley lines | Chingford Terminus |

== Connections ==
London Buses routes 212, 275, W16 and 675 serve the station.

== Bibliography ==
- Jackson, Alan A. (1999). London's Local Railways (2nd ed.). Harrow Weald: Capital Transport Publishing.
- Quick, Michael (2023). Railway Passenger Stations in Great Britain: A Chronology (PDF) (5th ed.). London: Railway and Canal Historical Society.
