= Hale End and Highams Park South =

Electoral ward in London, England

- Electoral ward for the Waltham Forest London Borough Council
- Borough: London Borough of Waltham Forest
- County: Greater London
- Population: 9,818 (2021)
- Major settlements: Hale End, Highams Park
- Area: 1.631 km²

Current electoral ward
- Created: 2002
- Seats: 2 (since 2022); 3 (until 2022)

Hale End and Highams Park South is an electoral ward in the London Borough of Waltham Forest. The Hale End and Highams Park ward was first used in the 2002 elections and elected three councillors to Waltham Forest London Borough Council. In 2022, the ward was renamed and lost one seat.

== Geography ==
The ward is named after the areas of Hale End and Highams Park.

== Councillors ==
Election	Councillors	
2022	Tony Bell (Labour)	Rosalind Dore (Labour)

== Elections ==
=== 2022 ===
Hale End & Highams Park South
Party	Candidate	Votes	%	±%
Labour	Tony Bell	1,612	54.7	
Labour	Rosalind Dore	1,594	54.1	
Conservative	Kieran Cooke	881	29.9	
Conservative	Huma Stone	718	24.4	
Women's Equality	Christine Dean	404	13.7	
Independent	Ed Pond	260	8.8	
Green	Michael Holloway	257	8.7	
Liberal Democrats	Canan Nuri	132	4.5	
TUSC	James Ivens	32	1.1	
Turnout			47.0	
Labour win (new seat)				
Labour win (new seat)				

== See also ==
- List of electoral wards in Greater London
