= Louis Benjamin =

British entertainment executive (1922–1994)

- Born: Isaac Louis Benjamin; 17 October 1922; Mile End, London, England
- Died: 20 June 1994 (aged 71); London, England
- Occupations: Show business executive, impresario
- Years active: 1930s-1989

Isaac Louis Benjamin (17 October 1922 – 20 June 1994) was a British entertainment business executive and theatre impresario. Among other leading positions between the 1960s and 1980s, he chaired Pye Records, was a managing director at ATV and at the London Palladium, and organised the Royal Variety Performances.

== Biography ==
He was born in Mile End, London, into a Jewish family; his father was a shoemaker. He worked as an office clerk for the Moss Empires theatre chain, before serving in the Royal Armoured Corps in the Second World War. After returning to Britain he resumed work for Moss Empires, becoming an assistant manager at the London Palladium, and then general manager at the Winter Gardens in Morecambe in 1953. In 1959, he was put in charge of Pye Records. Despite an initial lack of musical expertise, he revived the company's status with such stars as Petula Clark, The Kinks, Sandie Shaw, The Searchers, and Donovan, and set up the successful Golden Guinea line of budget records.

In 1975, while remaining at Pye, he was appointed by Lew Grade as joint managing director of the ATV television network. In 1980, he became managing director of Stoll Moss Theatres, becoming chief executive in 1982 and president in 1985. In that role, which included being in charge of the London Palladium, he was responsible for presenting the Royal Variety Performances held between 1979 and 1985. He was actively involved in show business charities including the Variety Club, the Grand Order of Water Rats, and the British Music Hall Society.

He retired in 1989, and died in London after a period of illness in 1994.
