= Monkhams (ward) =

Electoral ward in the London Borough of Redbridge

- Electoral ward for the Redbridge London Borough Council
- Monkhams ward boundaries since 2018
- Borough: Redbridge
- County: Greater London
- Population: 9,480 (2021)
- Electorate: 7,225 (2022)
- Major settlements: Woodford
- Area: 2.851 square kilometres (1.101 sq mi)

Current electoral ward
- Created: 1978
- Number of members: 1978–2018: 3; 2018–present: 3
- Councillors: Linda Huggett; Joel Herga
- ONS code: 00BCGN (2002–2018)
- GSS code: E05000509 (2002–2018); E05011249 (2018–present)

Monkhams is an electoral ward in the London Borough of Redbridge. The ward was first used in the 1978 elections. It returns councillors to Redbridge London Borough Council. The ward was subject to boundary revisions in 2002 and 2018.

== Redbridge council elections since 2018 ==
There was a revision of ward boundaries in Redbridge in 2018.

=== 2022 election ===
The election took place on 5 May 2022.

2022 Redbridge London Borough Council election: Monkhams (2)
Party	Candidate	Votes	%	±%
Conservative	Linda Huggett	1,694	57.6	▼8.2
Conservative	Joel Herga	1,658	56.4	▼10.1
Labour	Gregor Eglin	929	31.6	▲12.8
Labour	Kashif Qayyum	826	28.0	▲9.8
Liberal Democrats	Heather Liddle	368	12.5	▲0.8
Liberal Democrats	Andrew Vanezis	244	8.3	▲1.6
Turnout		2,942	40.7	▼1.4
Conservative hold		Swing		
Conservative hold		Swing		

=== 2018 election ===
The election took place on 3 May 2018.

2018 Redbridge London Borough Council election: Monkhams (2)
Party	Candidate	Votes	%	±%
Conservative	Linda Huggett	2,140	69.37	N/A
Conservative	Michael Stark	2,050	66.45	N/A
Labour	Catherine Rowan	579	18.77	N/A
Labour	Tareq Chowdhury	561	18.18	N/A
Liberal Democrats	Claire Hunt	361	11.70	N/A
Liberal Democrats	Mike Teahan	306	9.92	N/A
Turnout		3,085	42.14	
Conservative win (new boundaries)				
Conservative win (new boundaries)				

== 2002–2018 Redbridge council elections ==
There was a revision of ward boundaries in Redbridge in 2002.

== 1978–2002 Redbridge council elections ==
=== 1998 election ===
The election took place on 7 May 1998.

=== 1994 election ===
The election took place on 5 May 1994.

=== 1993 by-election ===
The election took place on 20 May 1993, following the death of Nancy Thurgood.

1993 Monkhams by-election
Party	Candidate	Votes	%	±%
Conservative	Michael Stark	1,407	52.3	
Liberal Democrats	Michael McElarney	926	34.4	
Labour	Philip Pollard	357	13.3	
Turnout			34.8	
Conservative hold		Swing		

=== 1990 election ===
The election took place on 3 May 1990.

=== 1986 election ===
The election took place on 8 May 1986.

=== 1982 election ===
The election took place on 6 May 1982.

=== 1978 election ===
The election took place on 4 May 1978.
