= Hale End =

Coordinates: 51.605°N 0.002°E

- Location within Greater London
- Population: 11,355 (2011 Census. Hale End and Highams Park Ward)
- London borough: Waltham Forest
- Ceremonial county: Greater London
- Region: London
- Country: England
- Sovereign state: United Kingdom
- Post town: WOODFORD GREEN
- Postcode district: IG8
- Dialling code: 020
- Police: Metropolitan
- Fire: London
- Ambulance: London
- UK Parliament: Walthamstow
- London Assembly: North East

Hale End is a locality in East London in the borough of Waltham Forest, very near Woodford Green, two miles from Tottenham and one mile from Walthamstow. It adjoins Highams Park in the E4 postal district. Much of Highams Park until the late 19th century used to be called Hale End. Hale End railway station was opened in 1873 and renamed Highams Park-Hale End railway station in 1894. The area of Waltham Forest within the Woodford Green IG8 postcode is, in particular, most often referred to as Hale End.

Population: 11,355 (Hale End and Highams Park ward, 2011 census)

== History ==
Originally the name Hale End covered a larger part of this part of London stretching from the North Circular Road (Wadham Bridge) all the way down to Clivedon Road, and to Sheridan Road approaching Chingford Hatch next to Highams Park Lake, but this changed at the beginning of the twentieth century when much of the area was renamed "Highams Park". Many references about the history of Highams Park are about Walthamstow ("Highams Benstead a hamlet of Walthamstow" also previously known as Haysham Town located just over a mile from Highams Park present location "The former Hale End"). Old maps give detail to this fact. The area was a clearing originally in the forest called ‘North End’ or ‘Wood End’. In 1285 a Walter de la Hale lived there but "Hale End" became used as the name only in the 17th when a Thomas Hale lived there.

== Governance ==
Hale End is part of the Walthamstow constituency for elections to the House of Commons of the United Kingdom.

Hale End is part of the Hale End and Highams Park South ward for elections to Waltham Forest London Borough Council.

== Demographics ==
In the 2011 Census the population of Hale End and Highams Park was 11,355 and is made up of approximately 52% females and 48% males. The average age of people in Hale End and Highams Park is 36, while the median age is 36. 76.5% of people living in Hale End and Highams Park were born in England. Other top answers for country of birth were 2.3% Pakistan, 1.1% Jamaica, 1.1% Ireland, 0.9% India, 0.8% Scotland, 0.7% South America, 0.5% Sri Lanka, 0.5% Nigeria, 0.5% Wales. The religious make-up of Hale End and Highams Park is 55.4% Christian, 21.3% No religion, 12.1% Muslim, 1.5% Hindu, 0.7% Buddhist, 0.6% Jewish, 0.4% Sikh, 0.1% Agnostic.
87.2% of people living in Hale End and Highams Park speak English. The other top languages spoken are 1.3% Urdu, 1.2% Polish, 1.0% Turkish, 0.9% Romanian, 0.6% Tamil, 0.6% Punjabi, 0.6% Lithuanian, 0.5% Spanish, 0.5% Bengali.

== Hale End Football Academy ==
The Arsenal F.C. Academy (referred to by its geographical location of Hale End) is based at Wadham Road, and acts as the hub for Arsenal's youth system. As one of the best funded football academies in the world, the campus houses state-of-the-art facilities. This includes several open sky 4G pitches, an indoor football complex (within the David Rocastle Indoor Sports Hall). Coaching, medical & rehabilitation facilities; sport science, analytics & administrative offices; a professionally catered cafeteria, recreational spaces, and classrooms. The internationally recognised setup is one of the most successful in football history; producing a high rate of professional footballers, and a high count of internationally capped footballers.

== Transport ==
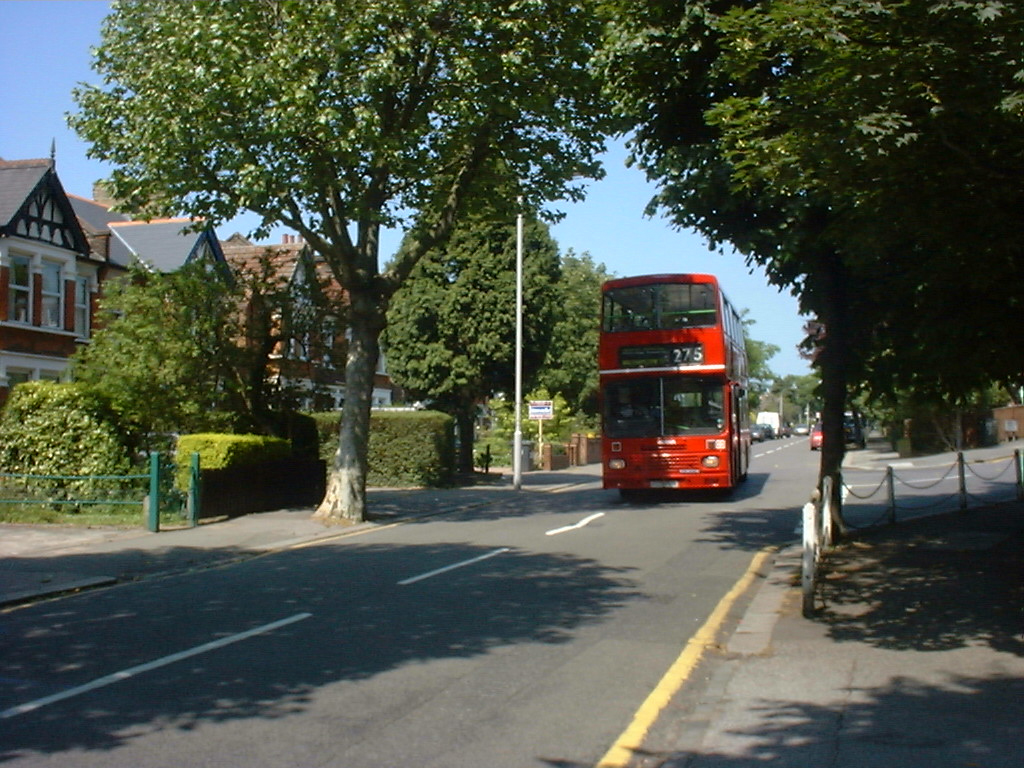
Old 275 bus heading for Hale End Road

- 275 Bus towards St James Street railway station, and the other direction towards Barkingside.
