= Friday Hill House =

House in Chingford, London, England

Coordinates: 51.623756°N 0.006971°E

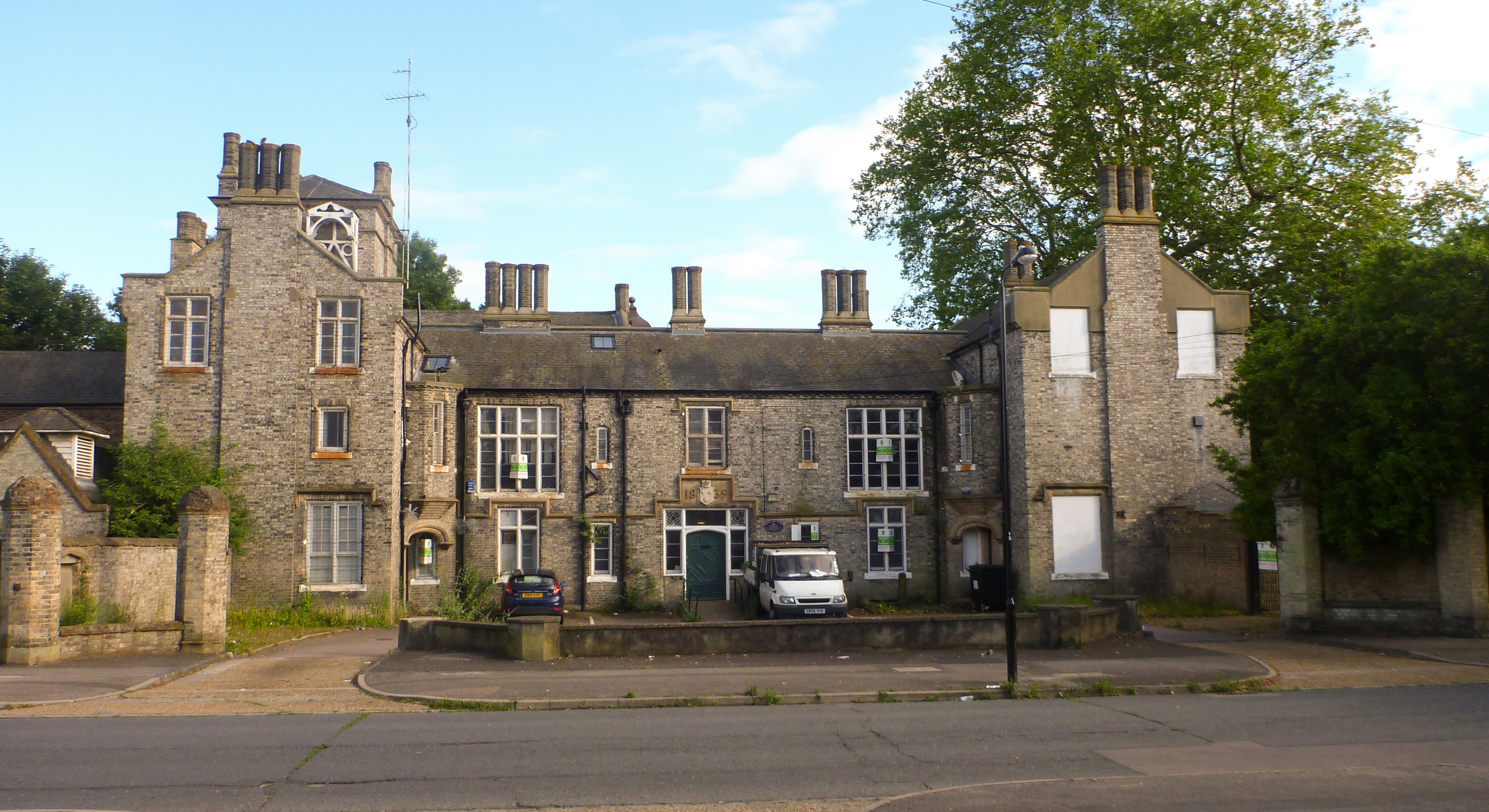
Friday Hill House

Friday Hill House is a Grade II listed house at 7, Simmons Lane, Friday Hill, London, E4 6JH.

The Manor House was built in 1839 by the architect Lewis Vulliamy and Robert Boothby Heathcote, who was both the lord of the manor and rector of the local church. It was he who paid for the building of the church of St Peter and St Paul in Chingford and a local school whose name lives on in the Heathcote School & Science College. He is buried in the Boothby family vault in All Saints' Churchyard (Chingford Old Church), Old Church Road. The vault was purchased by Robert Boothby (died 1733), who lived in the previous manor house. The Heathcotes lived in the 19th century house until the death of Louisa Heathcote in 1940.

The present building has been used as a further education centre, but was put up for sale in 2012. In 2019, seven flats in the house were sold leasehold for prices in the range £322,500 to £465,000 each.

The grounds hosts one of the Great Trees of London, a large London Plane.

Part of the estate was sold to the London County Council who built the Friday Hill estate.
