= Chingford Hatch =

Coordinates: 51.617977°N 0.003830°E

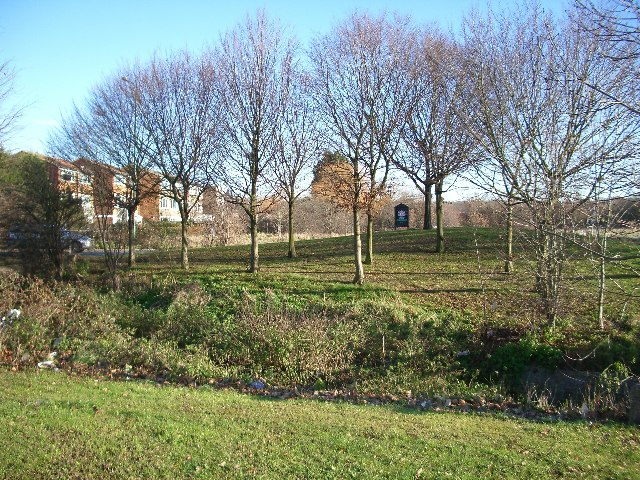
- Fields in Chingford Hatch

- Location within Greater London
- London borough: Waltham Forest
- Ceremonial county: Greater London
- Region: London
- Country: England
- Sovereign state: United Kingdom
- Post town: LONDON
- Postcode district: E4
- Dialling code: 020
- Police: Metropolitan
- Fire: London
- Ambulance: London
- London Assembly: North East

Chingford Hatch was one of the three hamlets comprising the old parish of Chingford, before the parish was developed in the nineteenth century into a large suburban town. The name is still widely used for the area immediately around Hatch Lane (A1009) at the foot of Friday Hill (OS Grid Reference TQ389930).

Saint Anne's Church serves the area and is located in Larkshall Road (at the western end of Hatch Lane). Originating in 1891 as a Mission Room, a permanent church was built and given its own separate parish in 1953.

Close to St Anne's is The Larks Hall public house, a timber-framed building that prior to the 1980s was Larks Hall Farm.
