= Robert Boothby Heathcote =

- Born: 13 May 1805
- Died: 19 September 1865; Chingford
- Education: Eton
- Alma mater: St John's College, Cambridge
- Occupation: Clergyman
- Spouses: Charlotte Sotheby; Elizabeth Bridget Wells
- Children: 7
- Parent(s): John Heathcote; Mary Anne Thornhill
- Relatives: John Moyer Heathcote (brother)

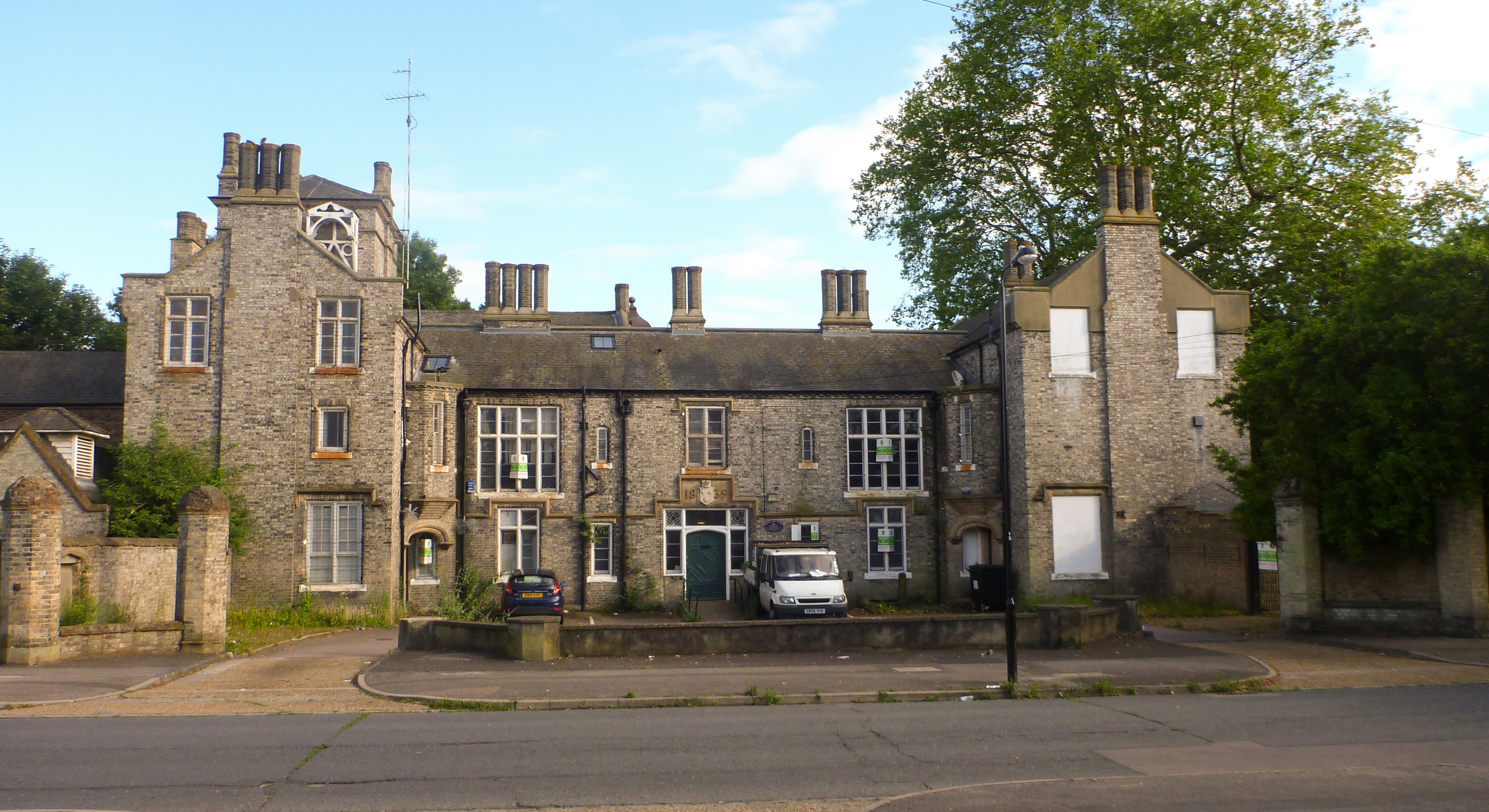
Friday Hill House

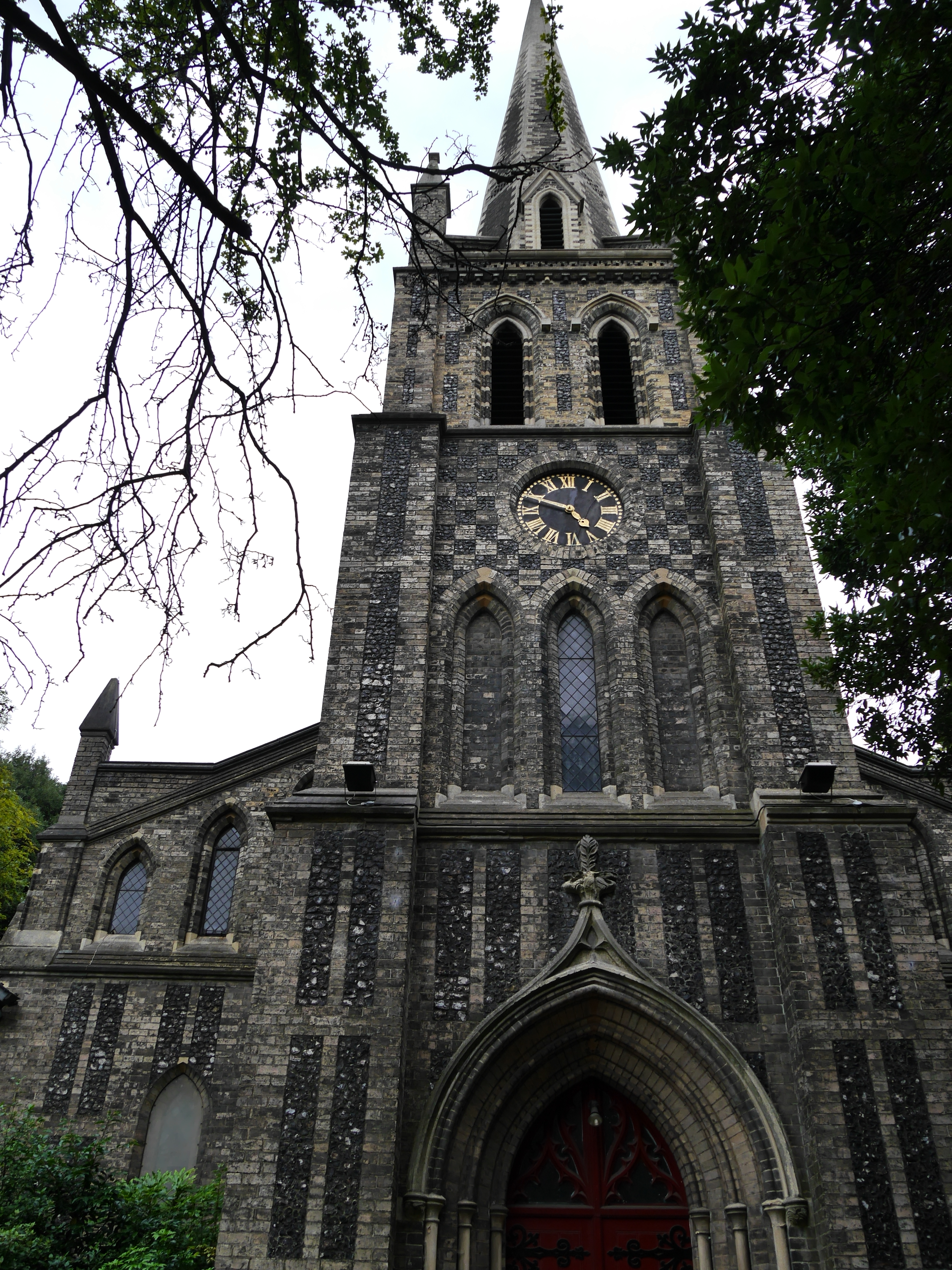
St Peter and St Paul, Chingford

Reverend Robert Boothby Heathcote (13 May 1805 – 19 September 1865) was a Church of England clergyman, who built Friday Hill House and other buildings in Chingford.

== Early life ==
Robert Boothby Heathcote was born on 13 May 1805. He was the second son of the politician John Heathcote and his wife Mary Anne Thornhill.

== Career ==
In 1839, Heathcote had Friday Hill House built by the architect Lewis Vulliamy to replace an earlier house.

Heathcote was rector of All Saints, Chingford, and was concerned about the poor condition of the church. From 1840 to 1844, he had a new church built, St Peter and St Paul, Chingford, on Chingford Green, built for £5,000 of his own money, and designed by Lewis Vulliamy.

== Personal life ==
In 1837 he married Charlotte Sotheby (d. 15 January 1845), the daughter of Admiral Thomas Sotheby and Lady Mary Anne Bourke, and they had three children:

- Charlotte Mary Heathcote (d. 13 January 1918), married William Proby, 5th Earl of Carysfort
- Katherine Sophia Boothby Heathcote (d. 13 December 1913)
- Robert Boothby Heathcote (10 January 1844 – January 1893)

On 10 October 1848, he married Elizabeth Bridget Wells (d. 1894), the daughter of Captain William Wells, and they had four children:

- Emily Frances Heathcote (d. 3 April 1934), married Robert Gurdon, 1st Baron Cranworth
- Louisa Gertrude Boothby Heathcote (d. 18 September 1940)
- William Edward Boothby Heathcote (11 June 1853 – 13 December 1915)
- Frederick Granville Sinclair (8 December 1857 – 16 March 1914)

Robert Boothby Heathcote died on 19 September 1865.
