= South Chingford =

Coordinates: 51.610795°N 0.027058°W

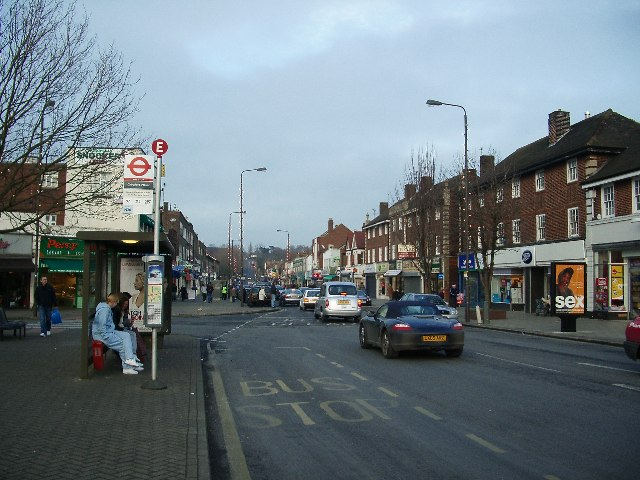
- Old Church Road, Chingford Mount

- Location within Greater London
- London borough: Waltham Forest
- Ceremonial county: Greater London
- Region: London
- Country: England
- Sovereign state: United Kingdom
- Post town: LONDON
- Postcode district: E4
- Dialling code: 020
- Police: Metropolitan
- Fire: London
- Ambulance: London
- London Assembly: North East

South Chingford is a largely residential area of Chingford in east London, England.

== Extent ==
South Chingford lies between Highams Park in the east, and the River Lea in the west. By some definitions it includes Chingford Mount.

== History ==
It was previously the home of a number of factories including a large Durex condom factory which closed in 1994.

== Features ==
South Chingford includes part of the Chingford Hall Estate which was built across the historic boundary with Walthamstow.

The area has several open spaces including Ainslie Wood, Larks Wood and Memorial Park. A small section of the River Ching flows through the area. Recently Fergal Sharkey hiked along the River Ching to raise awareness of pollution in the river.

South Chingford has no underground or railway station, but is close to Highams Park railway station. Chingford Road and Chingford Mount Road are a major bus corridor with bus routes 97, 215 and 357.
