= Municipal Borough of Chingford =

Former local government area in the UK

Coordinates: 51.6298°N 0.0006°E

Chingford
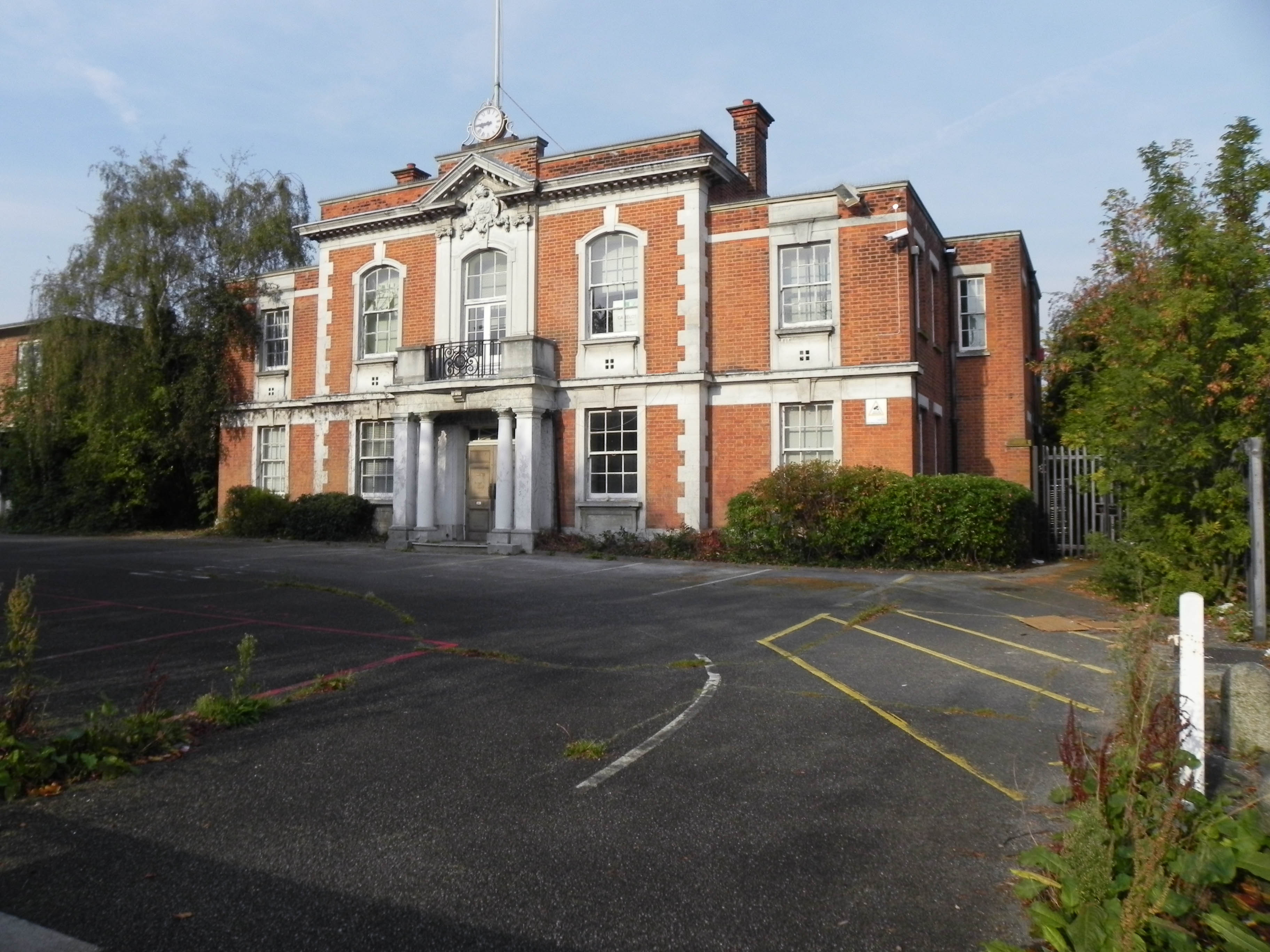
- Chingford Town Hall

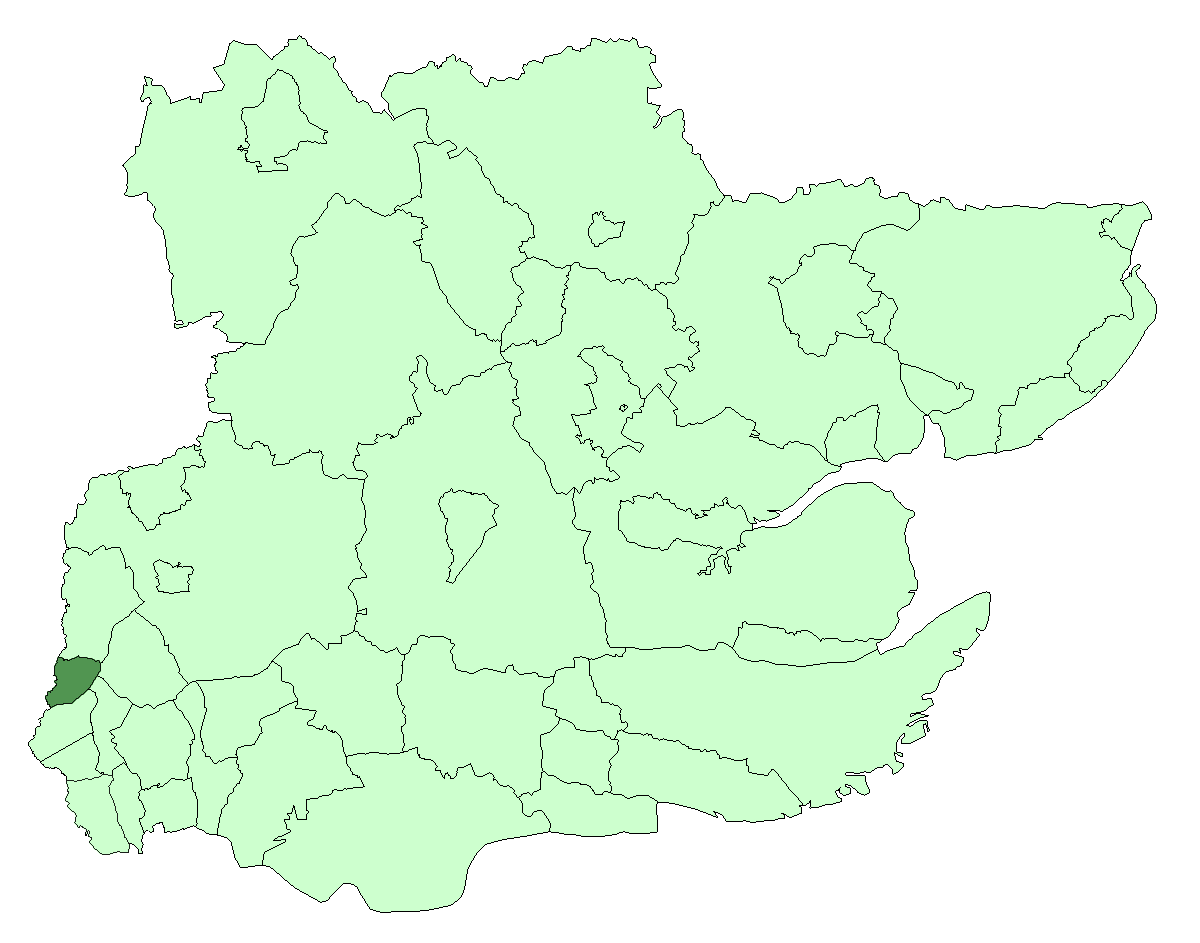
- Chingford within Essex in 1961
- Area
  - 1911: 2,808 acres (11.4 km^{2})
  - 1931: 2,810 acres (11.4 km^{2})
  - 1961: 2,868 acres (11.6 km^{2})
- Population
  - 1911: 8,184
  - 1931: 22,053
  - 1961: 45,787
- Density
  - 1911: 2.9/acre
  - 1931: 7.8/acre
  - 1961: 15.9/acre
- History
  - Origin: Chingford parish
  - Created: 1894
  - Abolished: 1965
  - Succeeded by: London Borough of Waltham Forest
- Status: Urban district (until 1938); Municipal borough (after 1938)
- Government: Chingford Urban District Council; Chingford Borough Council
  - HQ: The Ridgeway
  - Motto: All Things for the Glory of God
- Coat of arms of the borough council

Chingford was a local government district in south-west Essex, England. It was within the London suburbs, forming part of the London postal district and Metropolitan Police District. The parish of Chingford gained urban district status in 1894, and municipal borough status in 1938. The council headquarters were at Chingford Town Hall on The Ridgeway. At the 1961 census, Chingford had a population of 45,787.

In 1965, following the commencement of the London Government Act 1963, it was merged with the municipal boroughs of Walthamstow and Leyton to form the present-day London Borough of Waltham Forest within Greater London.

== Background and formation ==
The ancient parish of Chingford formed part of the Waltham Hundred of Essex. Following the Poor Law Amendment Act 1834, Chingford was grouped into the Epping Poor Law Union and in 1837 an identical area became Epping Registration District for the purposes of the Births and Deaths Registration Act 1836. It was included in the Metropolitan Police District in 1840. The Poor Law union area was used again for the purposes of the Public Health Act 1875 and Chingford became part of the Epping Rural Sanitary District that was created in 1875. In 1894 Chingford became an urban district.

== District and borough ==
Following the Local Government Act 1929, in 1932 it was proposed by Essex County Council that Chingford should be merged with Waltham Holy Cross Urban District to form a new urban district of Chingford and Waltham Abbey. The council of the Municipal Borough of Walthamstow favoured an expansion of their boundaries that would include Chingford. The Chingford/Waltham amalgamation was supported by Chingford Urban District Council but was not supported by the Waltham Holy Cross Urban District Council. The lack of a direct rail connection between the districts was highlighted as a potential problem. The review resulted in no amalgamation and only a small transfer of territory from Waltham Holy Cross to Chingford as part of a county review order in 1934.

The district gained the status of municipal borough in 1938.

== Abolition ==
The Royal Commission on Local Government in Greater London considered the borough for inclusion in Greater London in 1960 and subsequently it was abolished by the London Government Act 1963. Its former area was transferred to Greater London from Essex and was combined with the Municipal Borough of Walthamstow and the Municipal Borough of Leyton to form the present-day London Borough of Waltham Forest.
