= Heathcote School, Chingford =

Heathcote School and Science College

Location
- Normanton Park; Chingford, London, E4 6ES; England
- Coordinates: 51.626°N 0.011°E

Information
- Type: Community school
- Local authority: Waltham Forest
- Department for Education URN: 103097 Tables
- Ofsted: Reports
- Head teacher: Sonia Close
- Gender: Coeducational
- Age: 11 to 18
- Enrolment: 1164
- Colour: Blue/Black
- Publication: Metro
- Website: http://www.heathcoteschool.com/

Heathcote School and Science College is a coeducational community secondary school and sixth form in Chingford in the London Borough of Waltham Forest, England.
