= Chingford =

Town in east London, England

Coordinates: 51.623°N 0.009°E

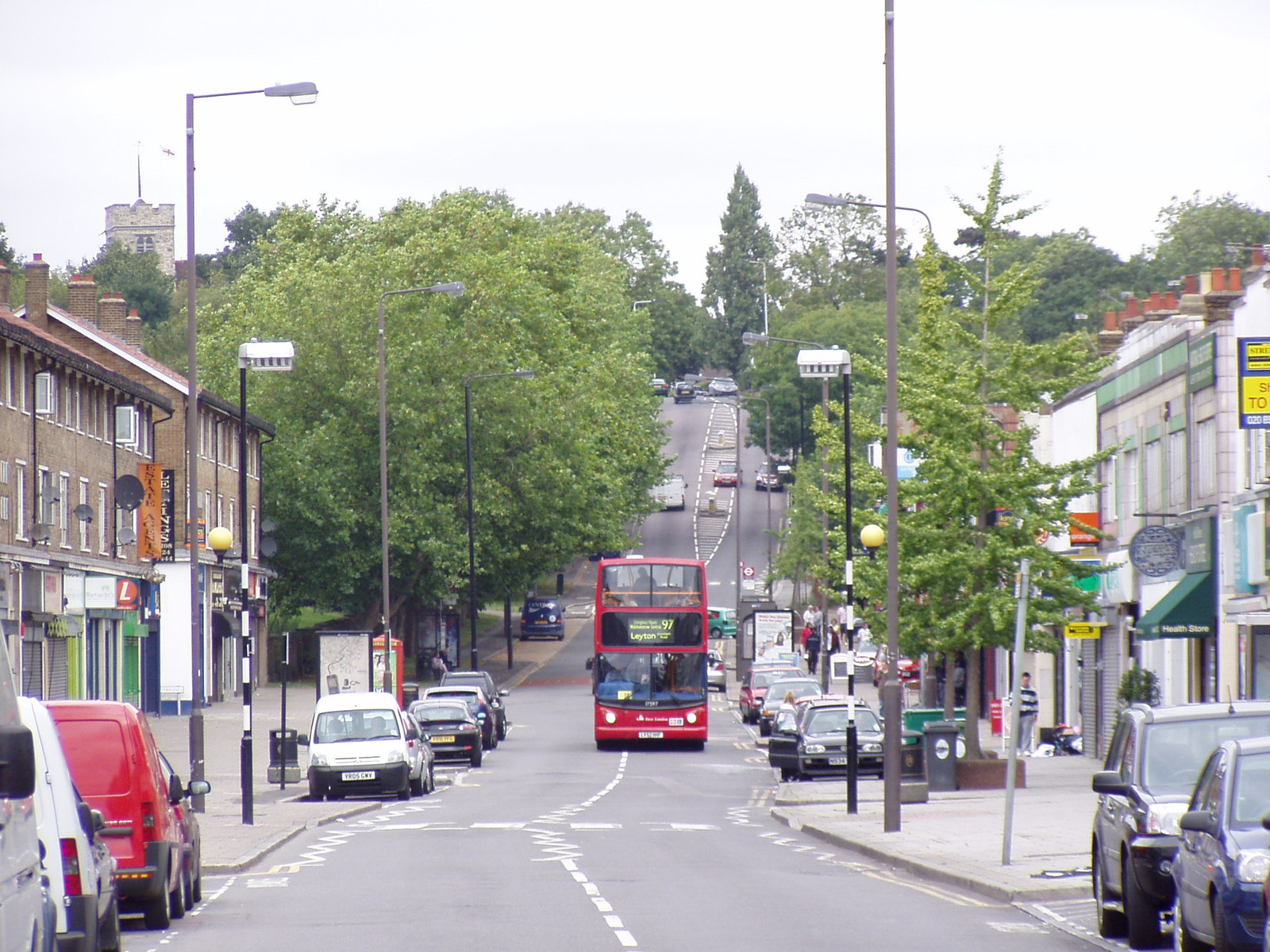
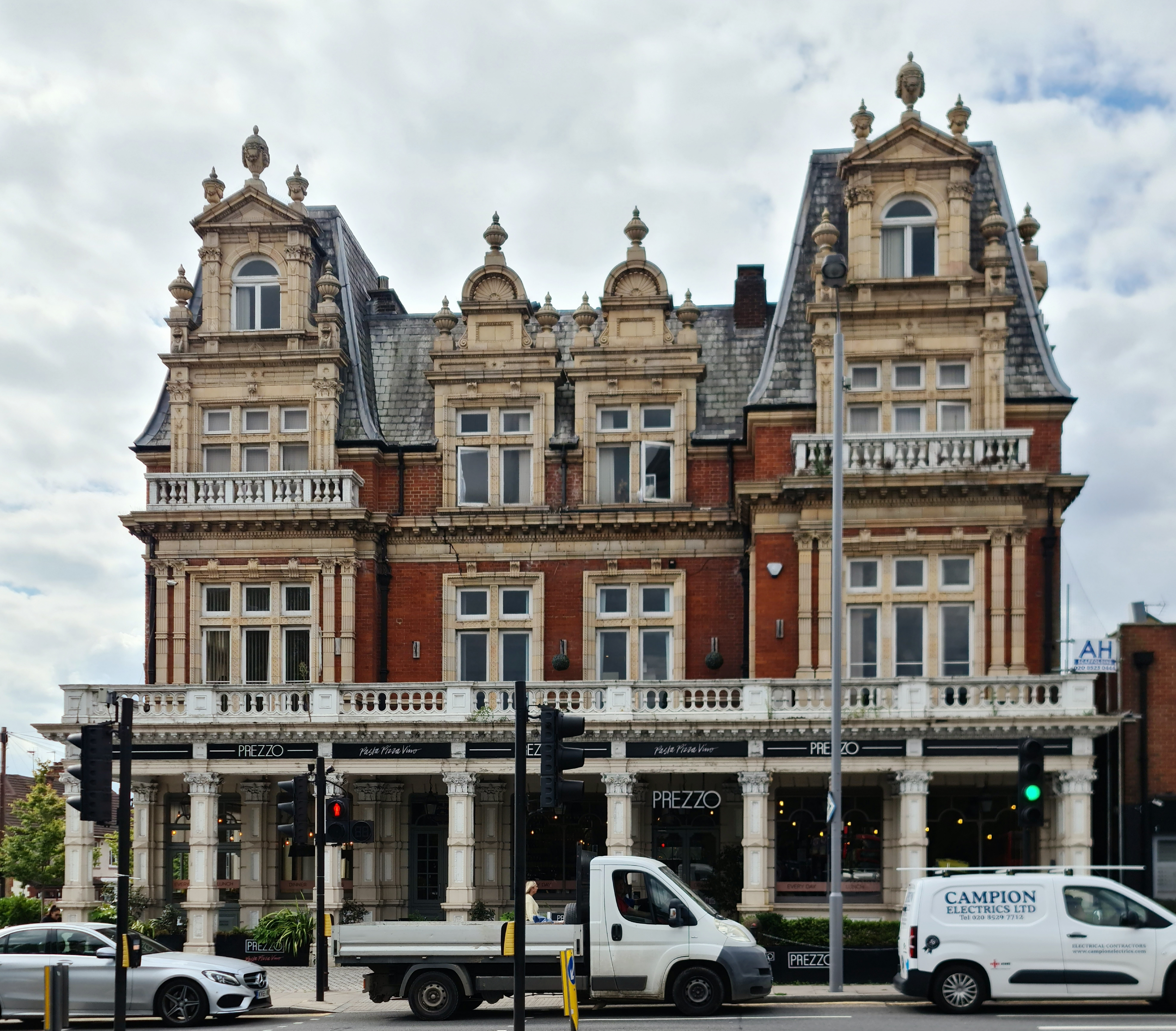
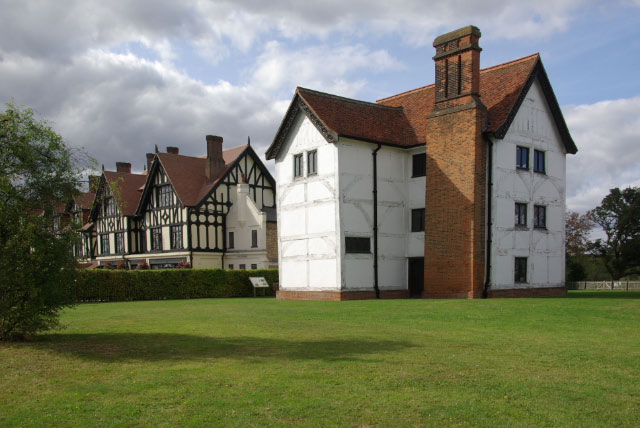
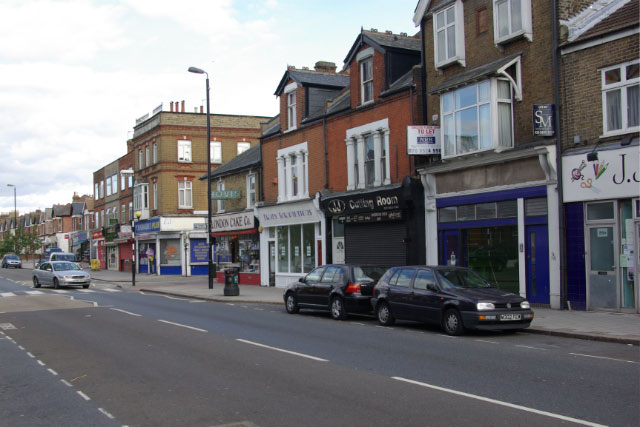
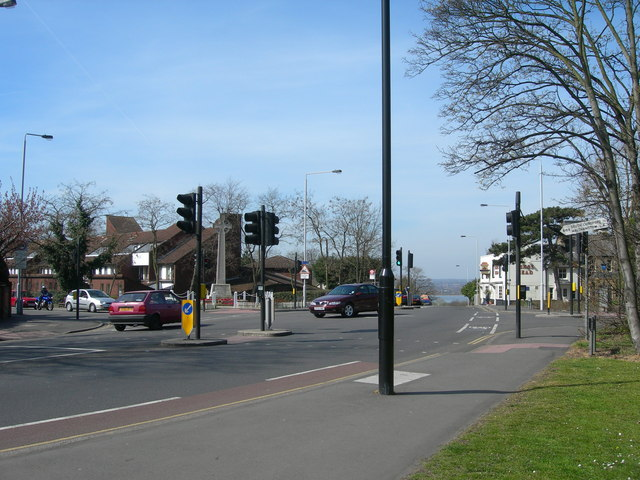
- Clockwise from top: Old Church Road in Chingford Mount, Queen Elizabeth's Hunting Lodge, Kings Head Hill and War Memorial, Station Road, and the former Bull & Crown public house

- Coat of arms of Chingford

- Location within Greater London
- Population: 70,583 (2021 Census)
- OS grid reference: TQ379935
  - Charing Cross: 9.2 mi (14.8 km) SW
- London borough: Waltham Forest
- Ceremonial county: Greater London
- Region: London
- Country: England
- Sovereign state: United Kingdom
- Post town: LONDON
- Postcode district: E4
- Dialling code: 020
- Police: Metropolitan
- Fire: London
- Ambulance: London
- UK Parliament: Chingford and Woodford Green
- London Assembly: North East

Chingford is a suburban town in east London, England, within the London Borough of Waltham Forest. Situated in the Lea Valley, around 9 1/2 miles (15 kilometres) north-east of Charing Cross, it lies between the River Lea in the west and Epping Forest in the north and east. It borders Waltham Abbey to the north; Loughton, Buckhurst Hill, and Woodford to the east; and Walthamstow to the south, with Edmonton and Enfield to the west. At the 2021 census, it had a population of approximately 70,583.

Chingford is characterised by a blend of suburban development with access to extensive green space. Its built environment is largely composed of interwar and post-war housing, particularly terraced and semi-detached housing stock, with high levels of home ownership. Areas such as Friday Hill, Chingford Hall and Yardley Lane were traditionally council or social housing. This is interspersed with local commercial centres such as Station Road and Chingford Mount. The ancient woodland of Epping Forest, maintained by the City of London Corporation, forms a natural boundary to the north and east and serves as a popular destination for walking, cycling, and outdoor recreation. Key access points include Chingford Plain, while elevated viewpoints such as Pole Hill offer panoramic views across London.

A particularly notable landmark is Queen Elizabeth's Hunting Lodge, a well-preserved Tudor timber-framed building erected in 1543 by Henry VIII as a grandstand for viewing deer hunts in the forest; today it functions as a small museum offering insights into royal hunting traditions and panoramic views over the treetops. Other local features include the Grade II-listed Chingford War Memorial, All Saints Church (with medieval origins), the town's parish church of St Peter and St Paul, and the former Chingford Town Hall on The Ridgeway, a Baroque-style civic building completed in 1929. The arrival of the railway in 1873 acted as a catalyst for growth, transforming the parish from a collection of scattered farms and hamlets into a London suburb while preserving pockets of open space and historic sites.

Historically, Chingford formed an ancient parish in the Waltham hundred of Essex. The name was first recorded in 913 AD, and the area remained largely rural until rapid suburban development in the late 19th century and during the interwar period. It was included in the Metropolitan Police District in 1840, and the London postal district upon its inception in 1856. The parish was granted urban district status in 1894, and municipal borough status in 1938. Local government was based at Chingford Town Hall until 1965, when the Municipal Borough of Chingford merged with the municipal boroughs of Walthamstow and Leyton to form the present-day London Borough of Waltham Forest within Greater London.

== History ==
=== Origin and toponymy ===
The first record of the manors of Chingford, is as Cingeford, in 913AD. It was also recorded with the spelling Cingefort in the Domesday Book of 1086. The meaning of the name is not certain.

It is thought that, similarly to how Kingston upon Thames appears in Domesday Book of 1086AD as Chingestone and Chingetun(e), with ching being old English for the king, that Chingford could refer to the King's river, and Kings Ford. There is evidence of King Harold Harefoot having lived in Chingford and the environs in the 11th century, a date which ties in with the Old English use of "ching" for "king".

Another suggestion is that the settlement's name has its origin as "Shingly Ford"—that is, a ford over a waterway containing shingles. However, this is likely to be incorrect, as the usage of the placename name "Cingefort" in the Doomsday book predates the coining of the word "Shingle." The earliest known usage of the Middle English word shingle is 1200AD and the word was not used to describe loose stones on a waterway until three centuries later in the 1500s.

The ford referred to in the place name may have been a ford used to cross either the River Ching or the River Lea. Chingford is close to a number of fords of the Ching. However, old maps and descriptions give a name for the settlement long before the river has a name and it is likely that the name of the river as "Ching" arose long after the settlement was named.

The alternative view is that the ford crossed the Lea, and a location near Cook's Ferry has been suggested. This may be supported by the form Chagingeford recorded in 1204, which may mean the ford of the dwellers by the stumps. The remains of pile dwellings, covering a considerable area, were found near the mouth of the Ching between 1869 and 1901, when the reservoirs were being built.

=== Administrative history ===
At Domesday, the manors of Chingford are recorded as being in the Waltham hundred of Essex. Manors were landholdings which initially also had an administrative role. Later the manors would be served by the ancient parish of Chingford. The civil parish was granted urban district status in 1894, and municipal borough status, as the Municipal Borough of Chingford, in 1938. Its administrative headquarters were at Chingford Town Hall.

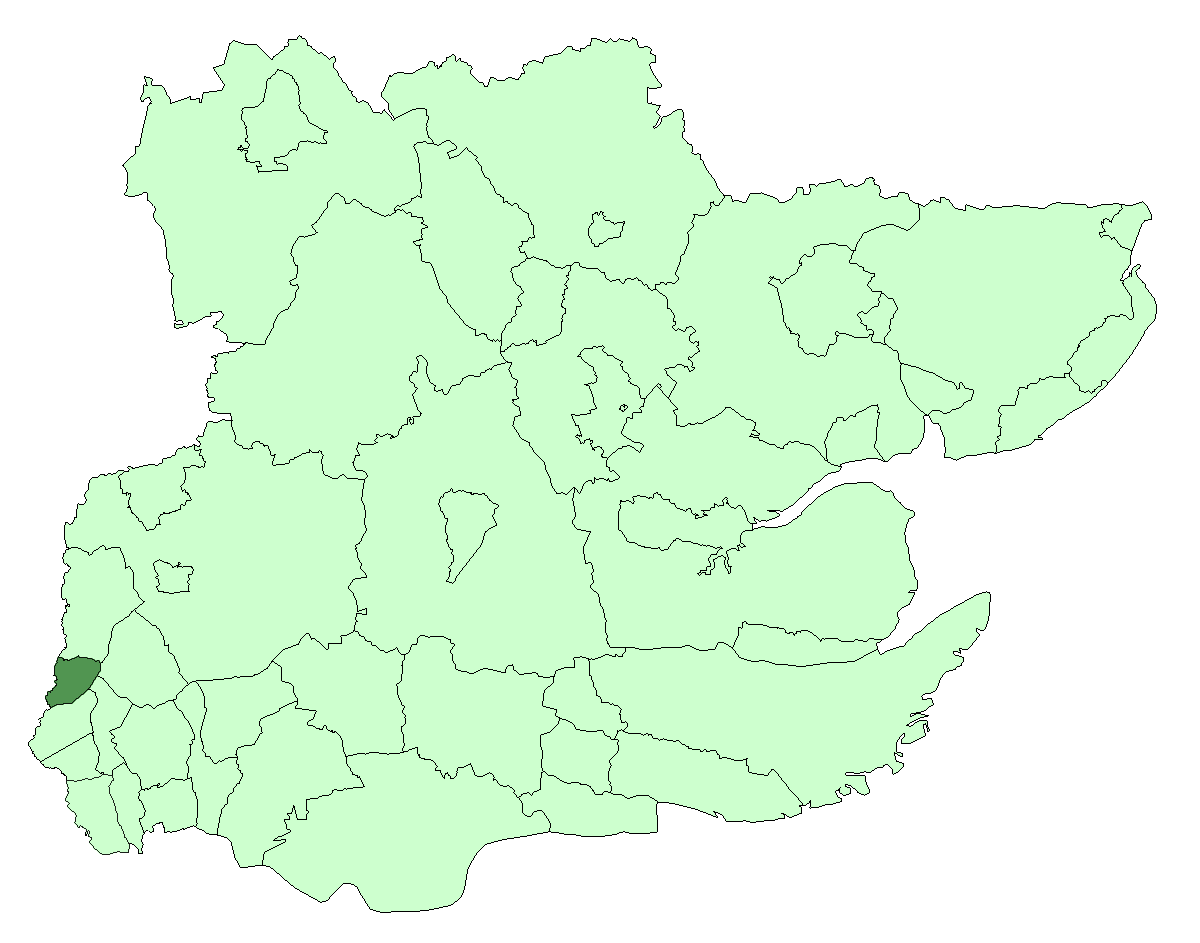
The Municipal Borough of Chingford, 1961

The Borough of Chingford's politics were dominated by the Chingford Ratepayers' Association, which was nominally independent, but against whom the Conservative Party did not field candidates.

In 1965 Chingford merged with the Municipal Boroughs of Leyton and Walthamstow to form a new borough, Waltham Forest, within the new Greater London.

=== Epping Forest and the railway ===
Chingford Station opened in 1873 and brought with it a huge increase in visitors to the area, many of whom used the town as a gateway to Epping Forest. The forest was given to the people by Queen Victoria in 1878 under the Epping Forest Act, which ensured it was kept unenclosed for public enjoyment.

The Royal Forest Hotel opened in 1880, and its location in Ranger's Road meant it soon became popular among day-trippers visiting Epping Forest. It is situated next to the historic Queen Elizabeth's Hunting Lodge, which the royal family used while hunting deer in the forest during the 1600s.

=== Urbanisation ===
The area was almost entirely rural until development began in earnest in the late 19th century. forming part of the conurbation of London. The area was included in the Metropolitan Police District in 1840 and became part of London's postal district upon its inception in 1856, with the NE postcode area replaced with E in 1866. The E area was subdivided in 1917 with Chingford approximating to the southern part of E4. Development accelerated after World War I.

== Geography ==
=== Scope ===
The area covered by the former ancient parish and subsequent Municipal Borough of Chingford includes Chingford Green, Chingford Hatch, Chingford Mount, Friday Hill, North Chingford and South Chingford.

The area of the parish and borough approximates to the southern part of the E4 Postal Area. This also roughly approximates to six Waltham Forest wards that lie north of the North Circular Road. The ward areas north of the North Circular also takes in Hale End and Highams Park, that were part of the parish and borough of Walthamstow.

=== Physical geography ===
The highest point, Pole Hill, has an elevation of 299 feet above sea level.

=== Neighbouring areas ===
Walthamstow (also part of Waltham Forest) is located to the south, with Woodford in the London Borough of Redbridge to the east, the borough boundary runs through Epping Forest.

The borough boundary with Epping Forest District in Essex, to the north, also runs through Epping Forest with nearby Essex towns in Epping Forest District include Sewardstone, Waltham Abbey, Loughton and Buckhurst Hill. Edmonton and Enfield are located west of the River Lea in the London Borough of Enfield.

== Landmarks ==
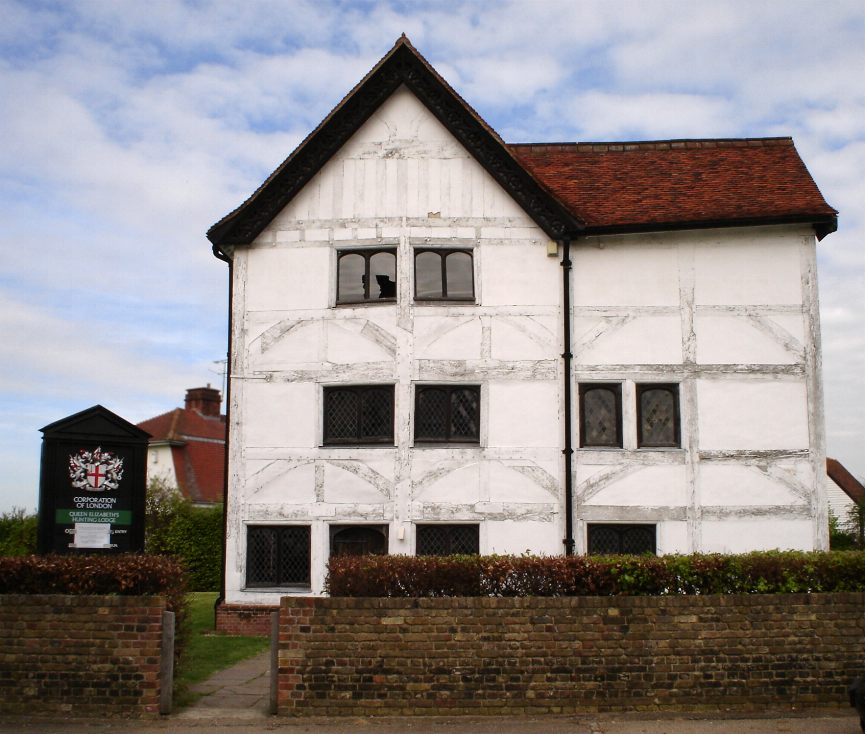
Queen Elizabeth's Hunting Lodge

One notable local landmark is Queen Elizabeth's Hunting Lodge. Originally called the Great Standing, it was built for King Henry VIII in 1543, and was used as a grandstand to watch the hunting of deer, although it has been heavily altered over time. The building is located on Chingford Plain within Epping Forest and is open to the public. The lodge is preserved under the Epping Forest Preservation Act.

The King's Head Hotel, on Station Road, dates back to at least the 1730s and it received a boost in trade as more people visited the area. It is still a popular hotel and has recently been refurbished inside, although the exterior of the building still preserves the character of its early days.

Originally a barn built in the mid-19th century, Butler's Retreat, a Grade II listed building, is one of the few remaining Victorian retreats within the forest. The building is adjacent to the Queen Elizabeth's Hunting Lodge and takes its name from the 1891 occupier John Butler. Retreats originally served non-alcoholic refreshments as part of the Temperance movement. After closing in 2009 the building was refurbished by the City of London Corporation and re-opened as a cafe in 2012.

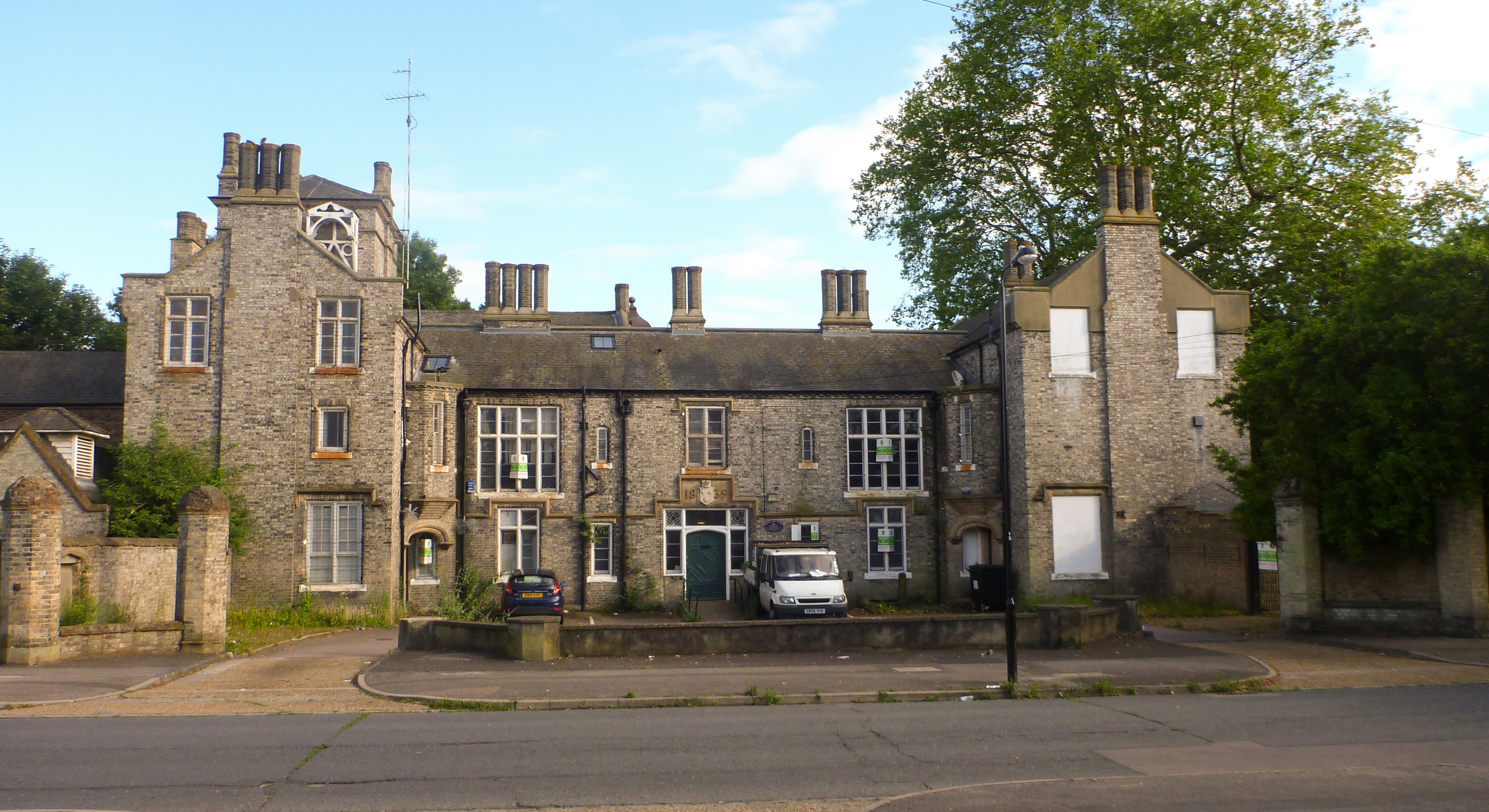
Friday Hill House

Friday Hill House, Simmons Lane, off Friday Hill, dating from 1839, was a manor house built and owned by Robert Boothby Heathcote, who was both the lord of the manor and rector of the local church. It was he who paid for the building of the church of St Peter and St Paul in Chingford. He is buried in the Boothby family vault in All Saints' Churchyard (Chingford Old Church), Old Church Road. The vault was purchased by Robert Boothby (died 1733), who lived in the previous manor house. The present building has been used as a further education centre but was put up for sale in 2012.

Pimp Hall Dovecote is situated in a green area at the bottom of Friday Hill and can be viewed by entering the Pimp Hall Nature Reserve. The dovecote, which had nesting space for 250 birds, belonged to Pimp Hall (originally Pympe's Hall), one of three manor houses around Chingford. In 1838 the estate was taken over and became part of the Chingford Earls estate. The farmhouse associated with it survived until just before World War II. This dovecote is depicted in the Millennium Heritage Mosaic on the front of Chingford Assembly Hall. It is the fourth item down on the left-hand side of the mosaic.

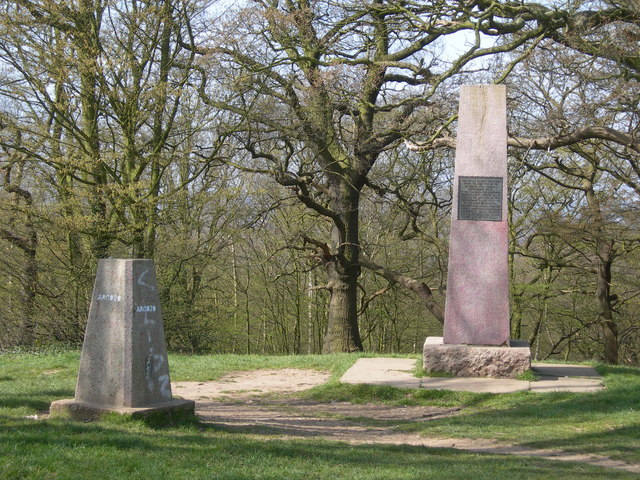
Pole Hill Obelisk

A granite obelisk at Pole Hill was erected in 1824 under the direction of the Astronomer Royal, the Rev. John Pond M.A., to mark true north for the telescopes of the Royal Observatory at Greenwich, south of the Thames. It was placed on high ground along the line of the Greenwich Meridian, but when this was recalibrated later in the 19th century, the obelisk was deemed to have been erected 19 feet (5.8 m) west of the revised meridian line. Today, an adjoining triangulation pillar marks the modern line.

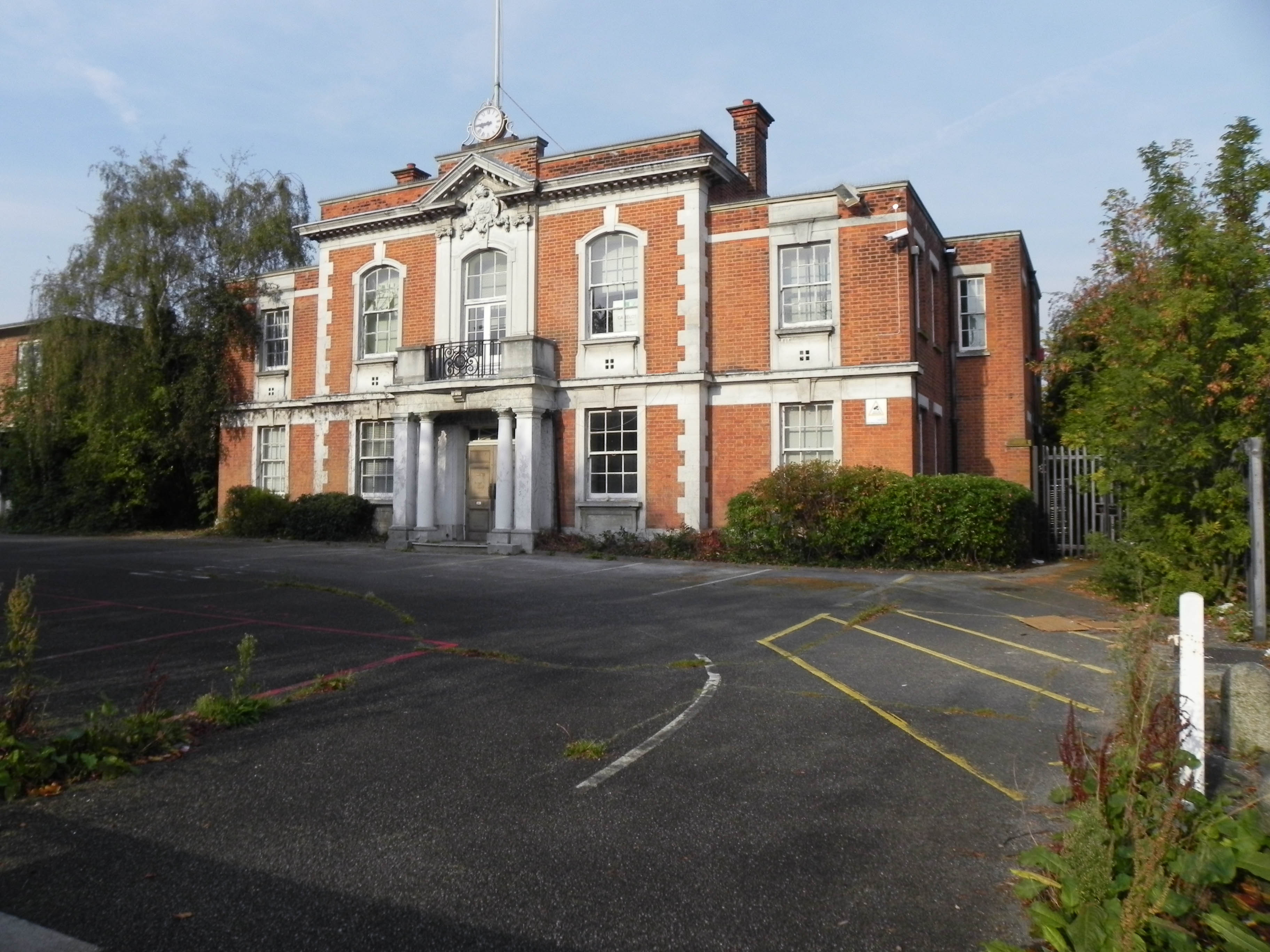
Chingford Town Hall, The Ridgeway

Chingford Town Hall, dating from 1929, is on The Ridgeway in Chingford. It has more recently been known as the Chingford Municipal Offices. The site was sold to property developers who built blocks of flats on the land and the town hall building was subsequently converted to apartments.

== Churches ==
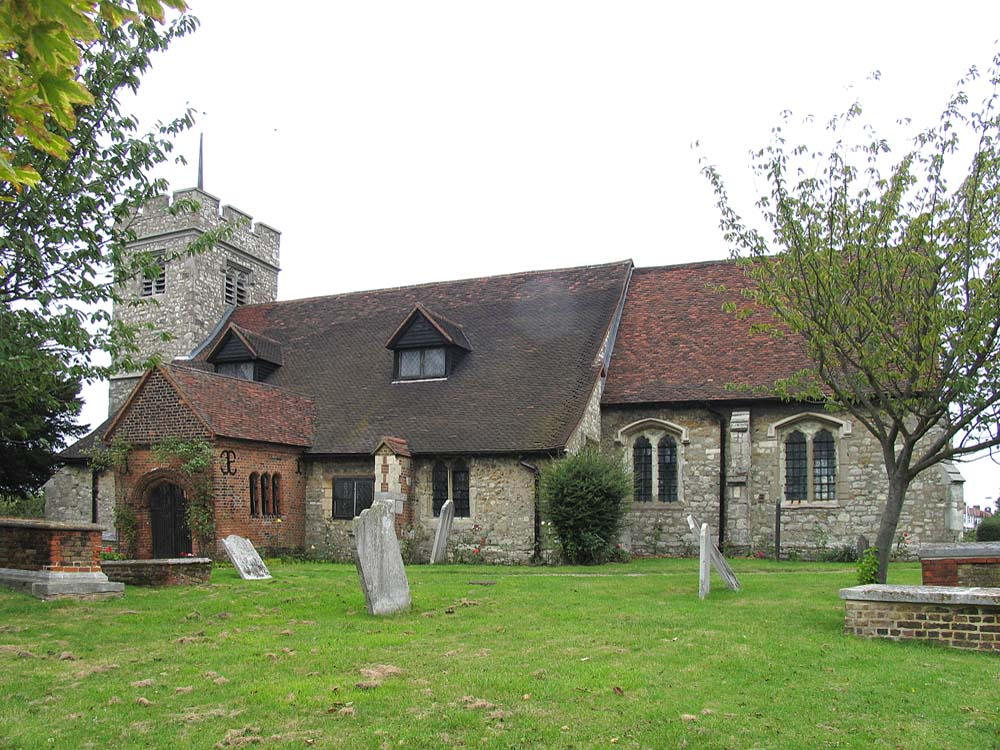
All Saints, Chingford, viewed from the south

All Saints' Church in Chingford Mount (known locally as the Old Church) is a Grade II* listed Church of England church at Old Church Road. Parts of the church date back to the 12th and 13th centuries, but it now forms part of the parish of St Peter and St Paul, Chingford, which took over its role as the parish church in 1844. The church stands on the summit of Chingford Mount and has views westwards towards the reservoirs of the Lea Valley. Directly opposite the church is Chingford Mount Cemetery.

The Roman Catholic church of Our Lady of Grace & Saint Teresa of Avila is on the corner of Kings Road and Station Road, next to St Mary's Catholic Primary School. The current half-timbered building dates from 1931, on the site of an earlier 1919 church.

== Governance and representation ==
=== Parliament ===
Chingford is within the Chingford and Woodford Green UK Parliament constituency, which consists of parts of the Boroughs of Waltham Forest and Redbridge. Iain Duncan Smith has been the sitting MP since 1992.

Former MPs include Norman Tebbit, Leah Manning, Stan Newens, and Winston Churchill (when Chingford was in the Epping constituency).

=== Waltham Forest ===
Chingford is part of the London Borough of Waltham Forest, which also includes Walthamstow, Leyton, and Leytonstone. Chingford consists of six council wards, namely:

- Chingford Green
- Endlebury
- Valley
- Larkswood
- Hatch Lane and Highams Park North
- Hale End and Highams Park South

Each ward is represented by three councillors, except Endlebury and Highams Park & Hale End South, which each have two. Currently all of the councillors represent the Conservative Party except for one Labour councillor in Valley and two in Hale End and Highams Park South. The London Borough of Waltham Forest is presently controlled by the Labour party.

=== London ===
Chingford and Waltham Forest fall within the North East constituency of the London Assembly, represented since 2004 by Jennette Arnold of the Labour party.

== Demography ==
As of the 2021 census, the population of Chingford was 70,583, an increase from 66,211 in 2011. The ethnic and cultural diversity of the town significantly increased in the decade between the two censuses, with less than half the town's population (49.1%) now identifying as White British, a fall from 62.7% in 2011, and 80.5% in 2001.

Population figures for Chingford are based on the six wards that comprise the town (Chingford Green, Endlebury, Hale End, Hatch Lane, Larkswood and Valley) combined.

Ethnic group	1991		2001		2011		2021	
Ethnic group	Number	%	Number	%	Number	%	Number	%
White: Total	55,746	92.9%	52,801	86.8%	48,155	72.7%	44,583	63.2%
White: English/Welsh/Scottish/Northern Irish/British	–	–	49,017	80.5%	41,511	62.7%	34,650	49.1%
White: Irish	–	–	1,165	1.9%	1,111	1.7%	1,178	1.7%
White: Gypsy or Irish Traveller	–	–	–	–	69	0.1%	24	0%
White: Romani	–	–	–	–	–	–	120	0.2%
White: Other	–	–	2,619	4.3%	5,464	8.3%	8,611	12.2%
Asian: Total	1,777	3%	2,724	4.5%	5,956	9%	8,622	12.2%
Asian or Asian British: Indian	685	1.1%	844	1.4%	1,184	1.8%	1,671	2.4%
Asian or Asian British: Pakistani	595	1%	989	1.6%	2,370	3.6%	3,607	5.1%
Asian or Asian British: Bangladeshi	113	0.2%	189	0.3%	522	0.8%	906	1.3%
Asian or Asian British: Chinese	134	0.2%	206	0.3%	328	0.5%	502	0.7%
Asian or Asian British: Other Asian	250	0.4%	496	0.8%	1,552	2.3%	1,936	2.7%
Black: Total	2,063	3.4%	3,722	6.1%	7,166	10.8%	8,721	12.4%
Black or Black British: African	571	1%	1,421	2.3%	2,724	4.1%	3,721	5.3%
Black or Black British: Caribbean	1,139	1.9%	1,916	3.1%	3,281	5%	3,838	5.4%
Black or Black British: Other Black	353	0.6%	385	0.6%	1,161	1.8%	1,162	1.6%
Mixed: Total	–	–	1,359	2.2%	3,238	4.9%	4,641	6.6%
Mixed: White and Black Caribbean	–	–	530	0.9%	1,291	1.9%	1,577	2.2%
Mixed: White and Black African	–	–	155	0.3%	390	0.6%	606	0.9%
Mixed: White and Asian	–	–	306	0.5%	634	1%	990	1.4%
Mixed: Other mixed	–	–	368	0.6%	923	1.4%	1,468	2.1%
Other: Total	402	0.7%	253	0.4%	1,696	2.6%	4,016	5.7%
Other: Arab	–	–	–	–	381	0.6%	382	0.5%
Other: Any other ethnic group	402	0.7%	253	0.4%	1,315	2%	3,634	5.1%
Total	59,988	100.0%	60,859	100.0%	66,211	100.0%	70,583	100.0%

== Housing ==
Chingford was the location of one of the interwar London County Council cottage estates.

LCC cottage estates 1918–1939
Estate name	Area	No of dwellings	Population 1938	Population density
Pre-1914
Norbury	11	218	867	19.8 per acre (49/ha)
Old Oak	32	736	3519	23 per acre (57/ha)
Totterdown Fields	39	1262	—	32.4 per acre (80/ha)
Tower Gardens; White Hart Lane	98	783	5936	8 per acre (20/ha)
1919–1923
Becontree	2770	25769 (Note: Source says 2589 – transcription error)	115652	9.3 per acre (23/ha)
Bellingham	252	2673	12004	10.6 per acre (26/ha)
Castelnau	51	644	2851	12.6 per acre (31/ha)
Dover House Estate; Roehampton Estate	147	1212	5383	8.2 per acre (20/ha)
1924–1933
Downham	600	7096	30032	11.8 per acre (29/ha)
Mottingham	202	2337	9009	11.6 per acre (29/ha)
St Helier	825	9068	39877	11 per acre (27/ha)
Watling	386	4034	19110	10.5 per acre (26/ha)
Wormholt	68	783	4078	11.5 per acre (28/ha)
1934–1939
Chingford (Note: Part of a larger PRC estate around Huntsman Road)	217	1540	—	7.1 per acre (18/ha)
Hanwell (Ealing)	140	1587	6732	11.3 per acre (28/ha)
Headstone Lane	142	n.a	5000	
Kenmore Park	58	654	2078	11.3 per acre (28/ha)
Thornhill (Royal Borough of Greenwich)	21	380	1598	18.1 per acre (45/ha)
Whitefoot Lane (Downham)	49	n.a	n.a.	
Source: Yelling, J. A. (1995). "Banishing London's slums: The interwar cottage estates" (PDF). Transactions. 46. London and Middlesex Archeological Society: 167–173. Quotes: Rubinstein, 1991, Just like the country.

== Local sport teams ==
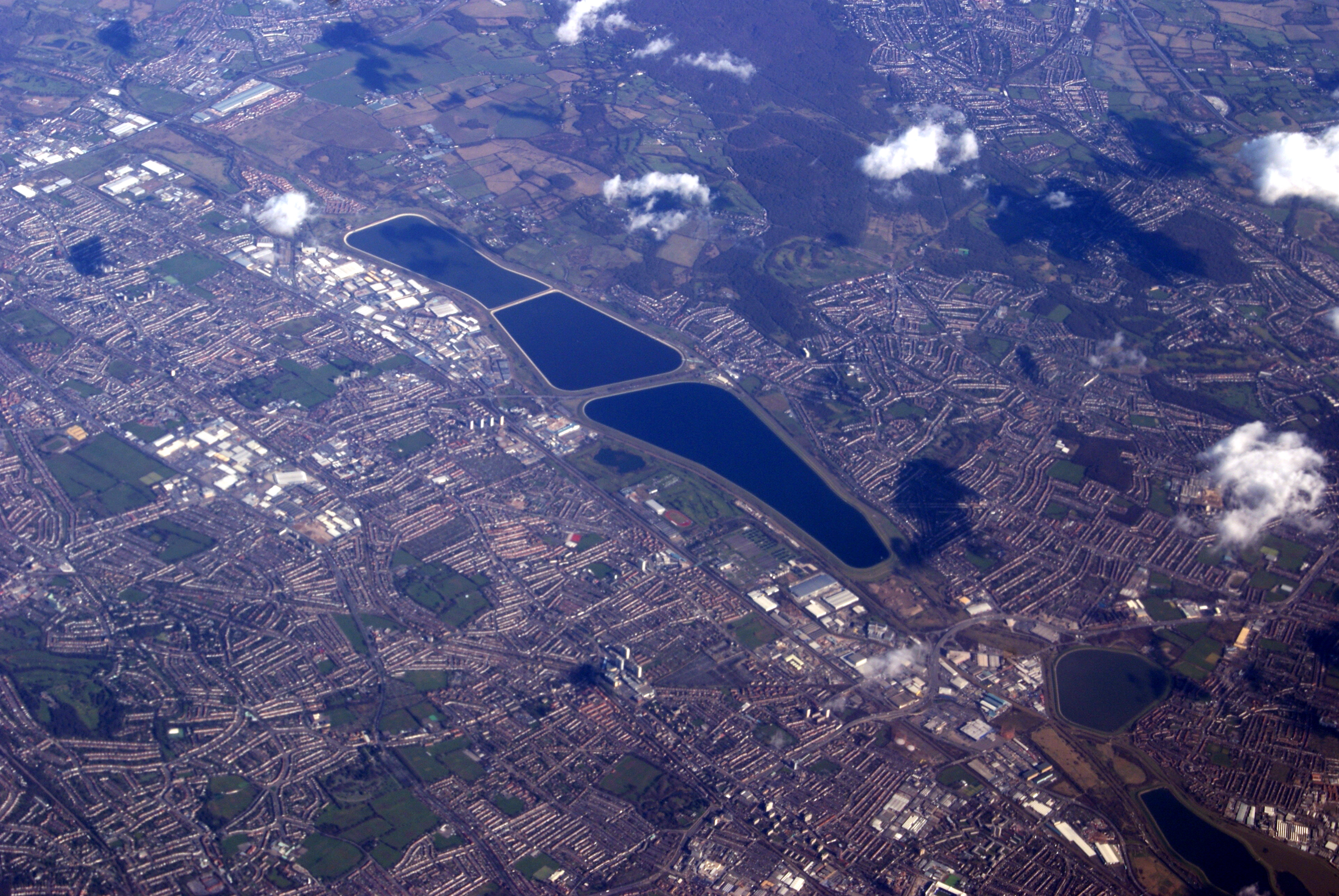
King George's Reservoir, home to the Sailing Club

- Chingford's oldest football club is Egbertian FC, formerly Old Egbertian FC, which was started by former pupils of St Egbert's College, Chingford. The club was formed in 1928 and is affiliated to the Amateur Football Alliance (AFA). The club plays in the Amateur Football Combination.
- Ridgeway Rovers Youth Football Club is a local club in Chingford East London. Notable former players include David Beckham, Andros Townsend, and Harry Kane.
- Chingford Rugby Club was also founded in 1928, and its ground is at Waltham Way, Chingford.
- Chingford Cricket Club is located on Forest Side, but the entrance to the ground is on Kimberley Way. It is believed to have been founded in 1884. The club plays in The Shepherd Neame Essex League and the first team were promoted to the Premier League for the 2013 season.
- Chingford Town Football Club was re-established in 2018 and competes with the local non-league teams of Essex.
- King George Sailing Club was founded in the 1970s to provide dinghy sailing and windsurfing on the largest and best sailing water in the north and east of London. The club enjoys facilities both on and off the water and has an active membership engaged in racing, learning to sail, casual sailing, and windsurfing. In recognition of its good facilities and encouragement of youth sailing, the Royal Yachting Association has awarded the club Volvo Champion Club status.

== Transport ==
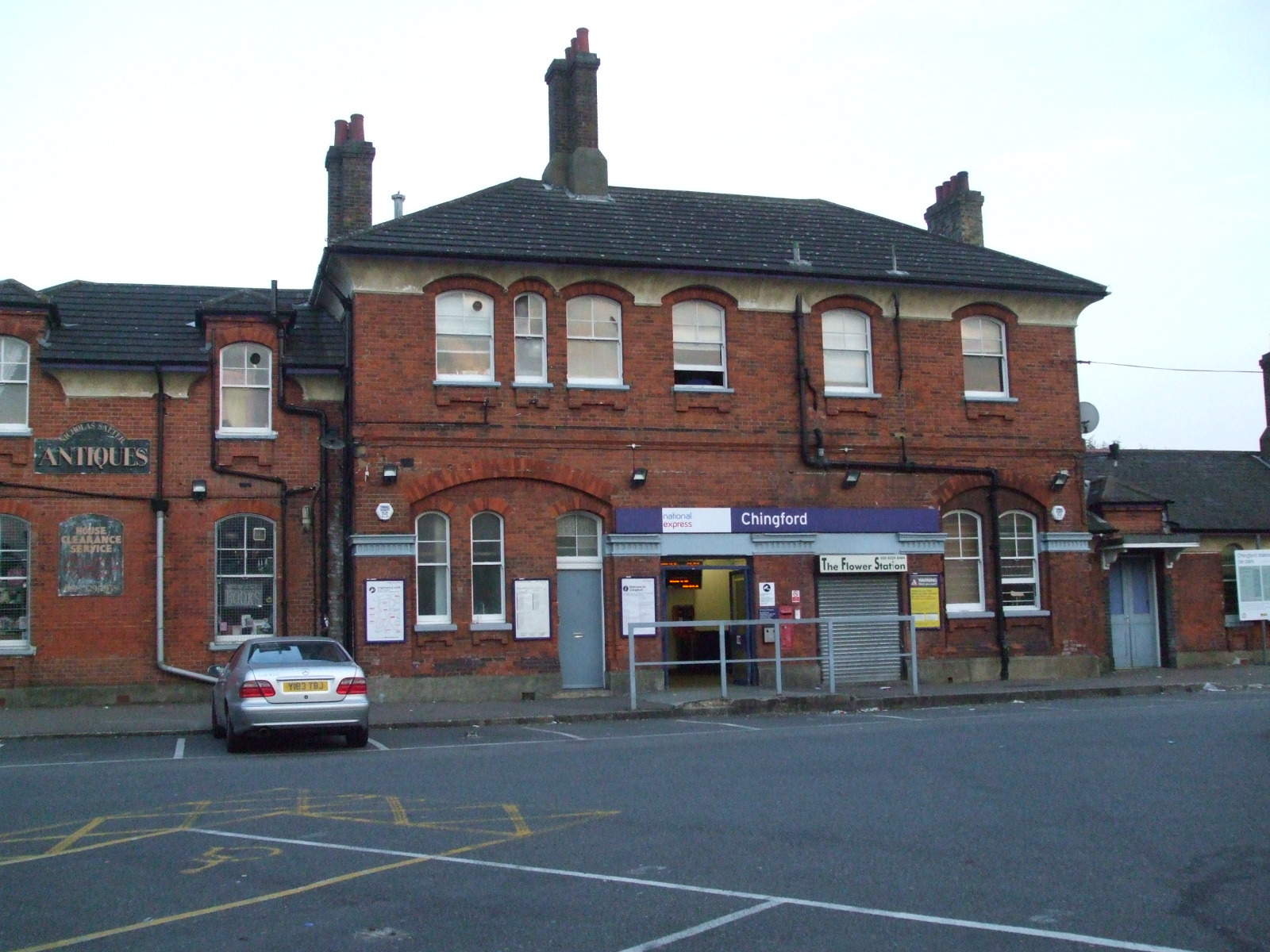
Chingford Station

Chingford is served by Chingford railway station – which is the terminus of the London Overground Weaver line from Liverpool Street station in the City of London. Chingford is the only station in Waltham Forest to be within zone 5. There is also a station at Highams Park, in zone 4. Chingford lost its rail link to Stratford with the removal of the 500 m length of track known as the Hall Farm Curve in 1970, and there have been campaigns for its reinstatement.

The following London Buses routes serve Chingford: 97 Chingford Station to Stratford City, 158 Chingford Mount to Stratford, 179 Chingford Station to Ilford, 212 Chingford Station to Walthamstow St James St, 215 Lee Valley Camp Site to Walthamstow Central, 313 Chingford Station to Potters Bar, 357 Chingford Hatch to Whipps Cross, 379 Chingford Station to Yardley Lane Estate, 385 Chingford Station to Crooked Billet Sainsbury's, 397 Crooked Billet Sainsbury's to Debden, 444 Chingford Station to Turnpike Lane, W11 Chingford Hall Estate to Walthamstow Central, W16 Chingford Mount to Leytonstone and night route N26 Victoria to Chingford Station.

== Education ==
Chingford secondary schools include:

- Chingford Foundation School
- Heathcote School
- Normanhurst School
- South Chingford Foundation School
- Lime Academy Larkswood

== Notable people ==
- Charles Alcock, founding father of the Football Association and creator of the FA Cup, moved to Chingford with his family when he was young
- Dame Louisa Aldrich-Blake, notable surgeon and pioneer in medical education for women, born in Chingford
- David Beckham, former England captain, grew up in Chingford from the age of three. He was educated at the Chingford Foundation School and also Chase Lane Primary School and played football for Ridgeway Rovers F.C., a local side
- Sir Winston Churchill, MP for Epping, a defunct constituency that included Chingford, from October 1924 to July 1945
- Sir John Dankworth, jazz composer, saxophonist, clarinettist and writer of film scores, grew up in Highams Park
- Alan Davies, stand-up comedian and regular guest on the quiz show QI, grew up in Chingford
- Paul Di'Anno, former lead singer of heavy metal band Iron Maiden, born and grew up in Chingford
- Sir Iain Duncan Smith, Conservative MP for Chingford and Woodford Green since 1992
- Samantha Fox, former glamour model and pop singer, lives in Chingford
- Dwight Gayle, current Stoke City striker, from Chingford
- Sir Peter Harding, former Chief of the Air Staff, was educated at Chingford County High School
- Steve Hillage, guitarist, from Chingford
- Sir Jonathan Ive, Apple chief design officer, born in Chingford
- Harry Kane, Bayern Munich and England striker, from Chingford and attended Lime Academy Larkswood and Chingford Foundation School
- The Kray twins, dominated the London gangland scene during the 1960s, buried in Chingford Mount Cemetery
- Dan Lawrence, England cricketer, brought up in Chingford.
- Professor Alan Mozley, zoologist, born in Chingford
- Michael Nyman, composer of minimalist music, notably film scores, grew up in Chingford
- Leslie Phillips, comedy star of the Carry On films, lived in Chingford
- Peter Sceats, businessman and political activist, brought up in Chingford
- Faiza Shaheen, academic and economist, grew up in Chingford
- John Sitton, former Chelsea footballer and Leyton Orient manager, lives in Chingford
- Kaikhosru Shapurji Sorabji, composer and pianist, born in Chingford
- Andros Townsend, former Crystal Palace and England midfielder, attended Rush Croft Sports College and grew up in Chingford
- Geoffrey Winters, composer, born in Chingford and taught music at Larkswood School from 1952
