= Chingford Town Hall =

Municipal building in London, England

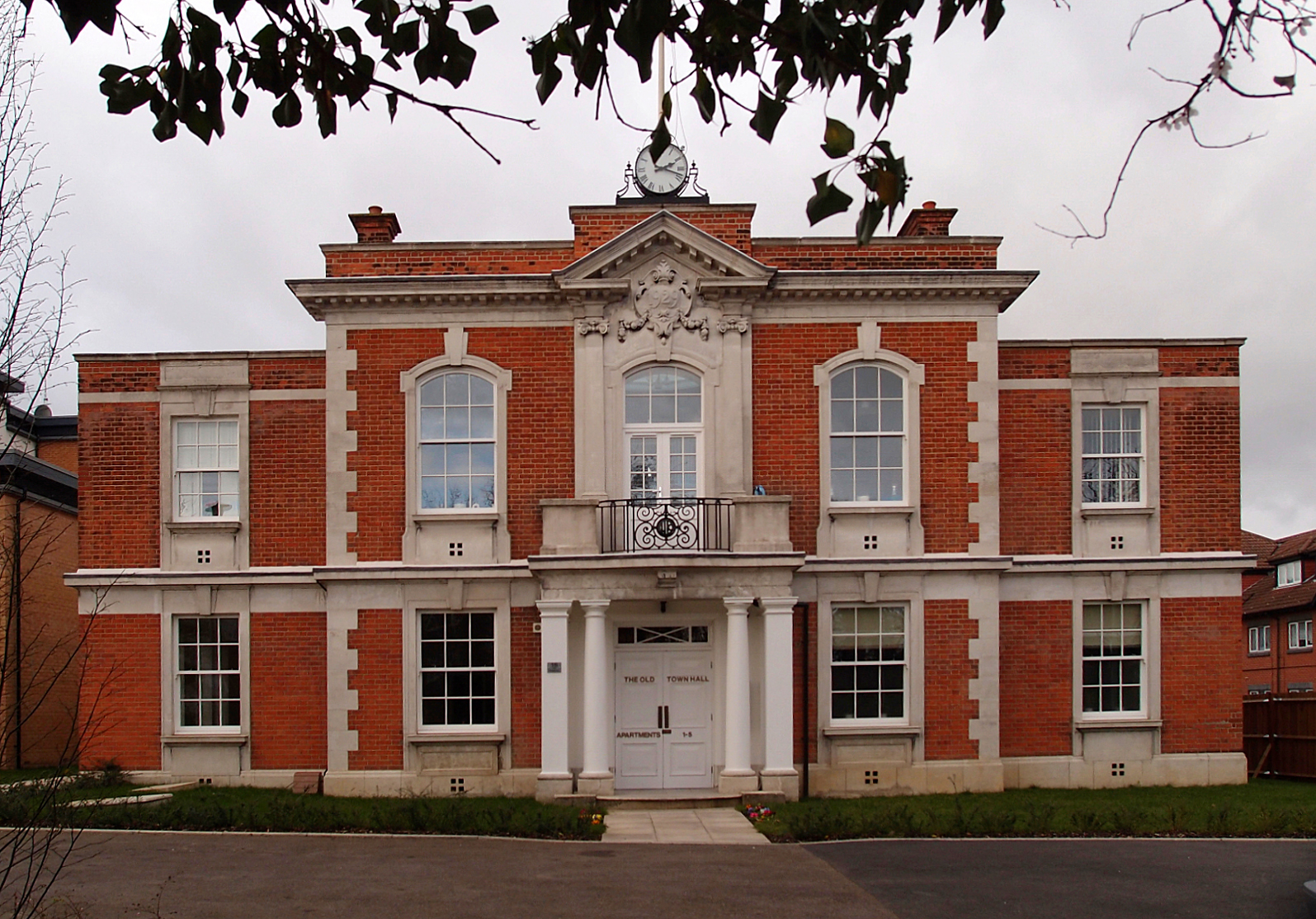
- Chingford Town Hall in 2016

- Shown in Waltham Forest
- 51.6300°N 0.0036°W
- Location: The Ridgeway, Chingford

History
- Built: 1929

Site notes
- Architect(s): Frank Nash and H.T. Bonner
- Architectural style: Baroque style

Chingford Town Hall is a municipal building in The Ridgeway, Chingford, London. It is a locally listed building.

== History ==
In the early 20th century Chingford Urban District Council was based at some aging council offices in Station Road. After civic leaders found that the council offices were inadequate for their needs, they elected to construct a purpose-built facility: the site selected on the Ridgeway had previously been open land.

The building, which was designed by Frank Nash and H.T. Bonner in the Baroque style and built by William Griffiths, Sons & Cromwell, was completed in December 1929. The design involved a symmetrical main frontage with five bays facing onto the Ridgeway; the central section of three bays featured a portico flanked by Doric order columns on the ground floor; there was a balcony and a round headed window with stone surround on the first floor and the borough coat of arms and a pediment above; a clock and flagpole were erected at roof level. Internally, the principal rooms were the entrance hall with fine terrazzo flooring on the ground floor and the double-height council chamber with public gallery on the first floor.

The building became the headquarters of the Municipal Borough of Chingford after it was awarded municipal borough status in 1938.

The town hall was extended by the addition a two-storey office block, designed by Tooley and Foster and built by Gray Conoley & Co. to the south west of the town hall. The new block, which became known as the "Chingford Municipal Offices", was officially opened by the mayor, Councillor J. A. Cooper, on 12 November 1960.

The town hall ceased to be the local seat of government when the enlarged London Borough of Waltham Forest was formed in 1965. The Chingford Municipal Offices were subsequently used as additional workspace by the council until 2007 but, after being found surplus to requirements, the whole site was sold to a developer, Fairview New Homes, in 2011. The Chingford Municipal Offices were subsequently demolished and site redeveloped for residential use: the town hall itself was converted into five apartments after planning consent was given in January 2013.
