= Pole Hill =

Hill in Chingford, East London

Coordinates: 51.636°N -0°E

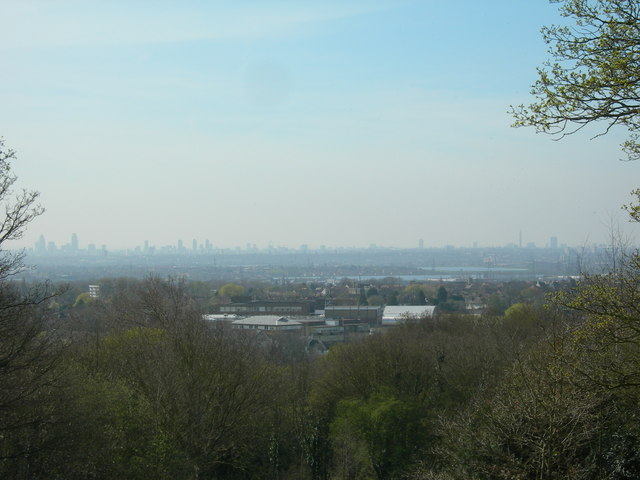
View of London

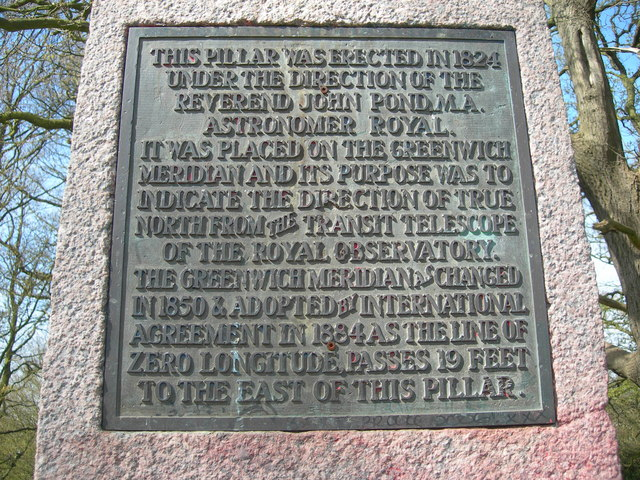
Plaque on obelisk

Pole Hill is a hill in Chingford, East London, on the border between Greater London and Essex. From its summit there is an extensive view over much of east, north and west London, although in the summer the leaves of the trees in Epping Forest have a tendency to mask some of the view to the north and west.

== Origin of name ==
The earliest recording of the name is as "Pouls Fee" or "Pauls Fee" in 1498. It is shown as Hawke Hill on the Chapman and André map of 1777. Hawke derives from the nearby Hawkwood. Hawk is the Old English for a nook, cranny or corner and so means wood at the corner of the parish (of Chingford).

It was named Paul because it was in the manor of Chingford Pauli, also known as Chingford St Paul's, which belonged to St Paul's Cathedral in London. Fee is from the Middle English fe which means a landed estate indicating it formed part of the manor. After the erection of the Greenwich Meridian obelisk mentioned below, it appears to have acquired the cognomen of Polar Hill, but this soon dropped out of use.

== Astronomical history ==
The hill stands in Epping Forest at 0 degrees longitude, and 51 degrees 38 minutes north latitude. At its highest point it is 91 metres (299 ft) above sea level. It is noted for the fact that it lies directly on the Greenwich meridian and, being the highest point on that bearing directly visible from Greenwich, was at one time used as a marker by geographers at the observatory there to set their telescopes and observation equipment to a true zero degree bearing.

On the summit of the hill is an obelisk made of granite and bearing the following inscription:

This pillar was erected in 1824 under the direction of the Reverend John Pond, MA, Astronomer Royal. It was placed on the Greenwich Meridian and its purpose was to indicate the direction of true north from the transit telescope of the Royal Observatory. The Greenwich Meridian as changed in 1850 and adopted by international agreement in 1884 as the line of zero longitude passes 19 feet to the east of this pillar.

At that point (19 feet / 5.8 m east) there is an Ordnance Survey trig point placed here to mark the top of the hill.

== Famous connections ==
T. E. Lawrence (also known as Lawrence of Arabia) once owned a considerable amount of land on the western side of the hill. Lawrence first rented the land, then began buying it in small parcels after the war. He dreamed of setting up a private press to print fine-edition books with his friend from Oxford, Vyvyan Richards.

Enthused with the ideals of medievalism and craftsmanship in the style of William Morris, they planned to house their press in a medieval-style timber hall to be designed by the architect Herbert Baker and built himself a small hut there in which he lived for several years. Lawrence's hut was dismantled in 1930 and rebuilt in The Warren, Loughton.
