= Normanhurst School =

Location
- 68-74 Station Road; Chingford; Greater London, E4 7BA; England; 51.6326°N 0.0069°E

Information
- Type: Private school
- Established: 1923
- Department for Education URN: 103112 Tables
- Headmistress: Mrs Jacqueline Job
- Gender: Mixed
- Age: 2 to 16
- Enrolment: 249 as of November 2015
- Houses: Warren (Yellow) and Connaught (Blue)
- Colours: Blue and Yellow
- Website: http://www.normanhurstschool.co.uk/

Normanhurst School is a mixed private school in Chingford, located in the London Borough of Waltham Forest. The school caters for around 285 boys and girls.

The school has 9 Year groups, starting at Lower Kindergarten up to Year 11.

== History ==
The school was founded in 1923, and has been owned privately throughout its history.

In 1996 Normanhurst became part of the Oak-Tree Group of Schools under the ownership of the Hagger Family. The Oak-Tree Schools are a group of four privately owned independent schools, comprising Braeside School in Buckhurst Hill, Oaklands School in Loughton, Coopersale Hall School in Epping and Normanhurst School.

Normanhurst School was formed in 1923 in the Ridgeway, and then the school later moved to its present site in Station Road soon after.

During the Blitz, one of the specialist rooms in the school was used as a bomb shelter which held 100 people. There was some damage to the school due to bombing so some classes had to operate from local parents' homes for a short while.

== School Years ==
The school is an all-through independent day school for girls and boys aged 21/2 to 16.

== The Oak-Tree Group of Schools ==
The four schools in the Oak-Tree Group are located within a 6-mile radius on the South West Essex/North London borders and include Braeside School in Buckhurst Hill, Coopersale Hall School in Epping, Normanhurst School in North Chingford and Oaklands School in Loughton.
