= Chingford Mount =

Area in London, England

Coordinates: 51.618656°N 0.017188°W

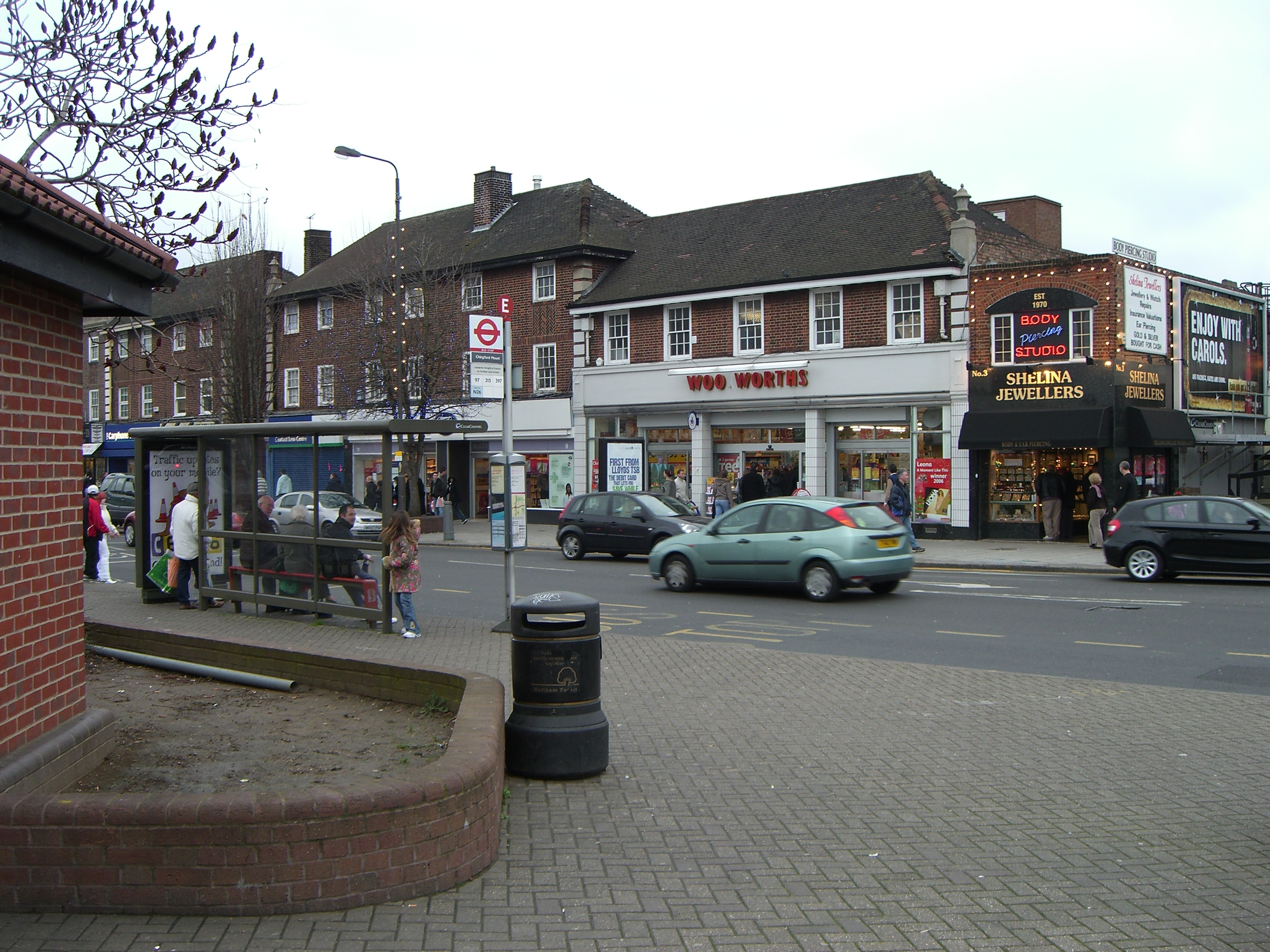
- Shops at Chingford Mount

- Location within Greater London
- London borough: Waltham Forest
- Ceremonial county: Greater London
- Region: London
- Country: England
- Sovereign state: United Kingdom
- Post town: LONDON
- Postcode district: E4
- Dialling code: 020
- Police: Metropolitan
- Fire: London
- Ambulance: London
- London Assembly: North East

Chingford Mount is an area of Chingford, east London, England, located in South Chingford. The name refers to the shopping area located around A112/A1009 crossroads (OS Grid Reference TQ373928), though it is also used for the hill leading north from the crossroads to Chingford Old Church. The original name for this hill was Merry Hill or Church Hill.

Many of the buildings were erected in the 1930s to Art Deco designs. The impressive Chingford Odeon cinema, an original Oscar Deutsch building designed by Andrew Mather and opened in September 1935, was demolished in 1972 to make way for a supermarket.

North of the shopping area and opposite the Old Church is Chingford Mount Cemetery. Opened in May 1884, 41 1/2 acres in size, it was laid out on the site of the house and grounds of Caroline Mount. Among those buried in the cemetery are the Kray twins and other members of their family. The cemetery contains the war graves of 137 Commonwealth service personnel of World War I and 182 of World War II, with the names of those whose graves have no headstones being listed on a low screen wall surrounding the War Graves Plot in Section F13.

To the south of the shopping area is St Edmund's Parish Church. Built in 1939, it was designed by the architect N.F. Cachemaille-Day and is a Grade II listed building.

Until the 1850s, this part of Chingford was solely farmland, with Cherrydown Farm to the north of the crossroads and Normanshire Farm to the south of it. In the second half of the nineteenth century, the Prince Albert Inn was built at the crossroads. Though cottages and houses were later built along Old Church Hill, shops only began to appear once the tramway was extended to the Albert Corner in 1904. The name was firmly established by 1923, when the section of Chingford Road from the Chingford-Walthamstow boundary to the crossroads was renamed Chingford Mount Road.
