= Ainslie Wood, London =

Local nature reserve in Greater London, England

Ainslie Wood
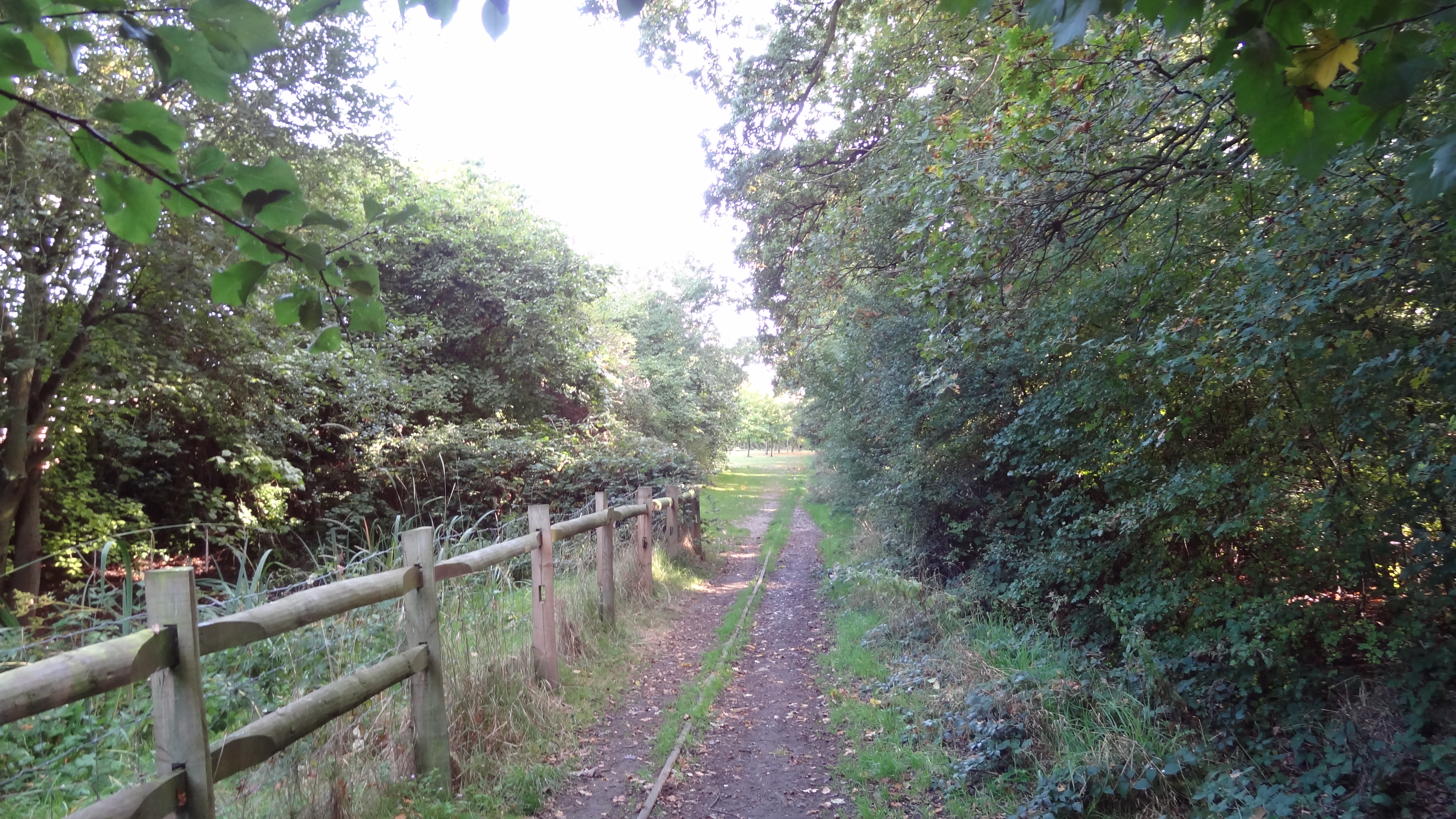
- Interactive map of Ainslie Wood
- Location: Chingford
- Nearest city: London
- Coordinates: 51.6108°N 0.01136°W
- Area: 2.03 hectares (5.0 acres)
- Operator: London Borough of Waltham Forest
- Open: Unrestricted
- Designation: Local Nature Reserve
- Public transit: Highams Park

Ainslie Wood (previously known as Endleigh Wood and Little Larks) is a 2.03 hectares (5.0 acres) Local Nature Reserve and a Grade I Site of Nature Conservation Interest surrounded by urban housing in Chingford in the London Borough of Waltham Forest in England. It is owned by Waltham Forest Borough Council and operated by the council with Friends of Ainslie and Larks Woods.

The site is ancient woodland. The main trees are oak, hornbeam and the rarer wild service tree. The park hosts a great variety of birds, including great spotted woodpeckers, blue tits, great tits, robins, wrens, long tailed tits and jays. The wildlife also includes squirrels and foxes. It also has rich ground flora, including bluebells, dog's-mercury and wood anemone.

There is access from Royston Avenue, Ropers Avenue and Woodside Gardens.
