= Alan Mozley =

English zoologist

Walter Alan Mozley FRSE (20 June 1904 – 16 August 1971) was an English zoologist who was known for his knowledge of freshwater snails, water insects and mollusca, and their impact on tropical disease.

== Life ==
He was born on 20 June 1904 in Chingford in Essex.

He studied zoology at the University of Manitoba graduating with an BSc then obtained a post in the Smithsonian Institution 1931–1934. He was awarded the Walter Rathbone Bacon Travelling Scholarship by the Smithsonian and in 1934 he returned to Britain to join the Zoology Department of the University of Edinburgh. Here he gained two doctorates (DSc and PhD).

In 1935 he was elected a Fellow of the Royal Society of Edinburgh. His proposers were James Hartley Ashworth, Charles Henry O'Donoghue, Alfred Ernest Cameron and Arthur Lancelot Craig-Bennett.

He gained his first professorship as Professor of Zoology at the Training College in Baghdad in Iraq after the Second World War. He also received a Fellowship from Johns Hopkins University. His final working years were spent at Schenectady College in New York.

He died on 16 August 1971 at Lynden, Washington. He is buried in Greenacres Memorial Park in Washington.

== Publications ==
- New Freshwater Molluscs from Northern Asia (1934)
- Statistical Analysis of Distribution of Pond Mulluscs (1936)
- Freshwater Mollusca of Tanganyika Territory and Zanzibar (1940)
- An Introduction to Molluscan Ecology (1954)
