= Queen Elizabeth's Hunting Lodge =

Tudor building

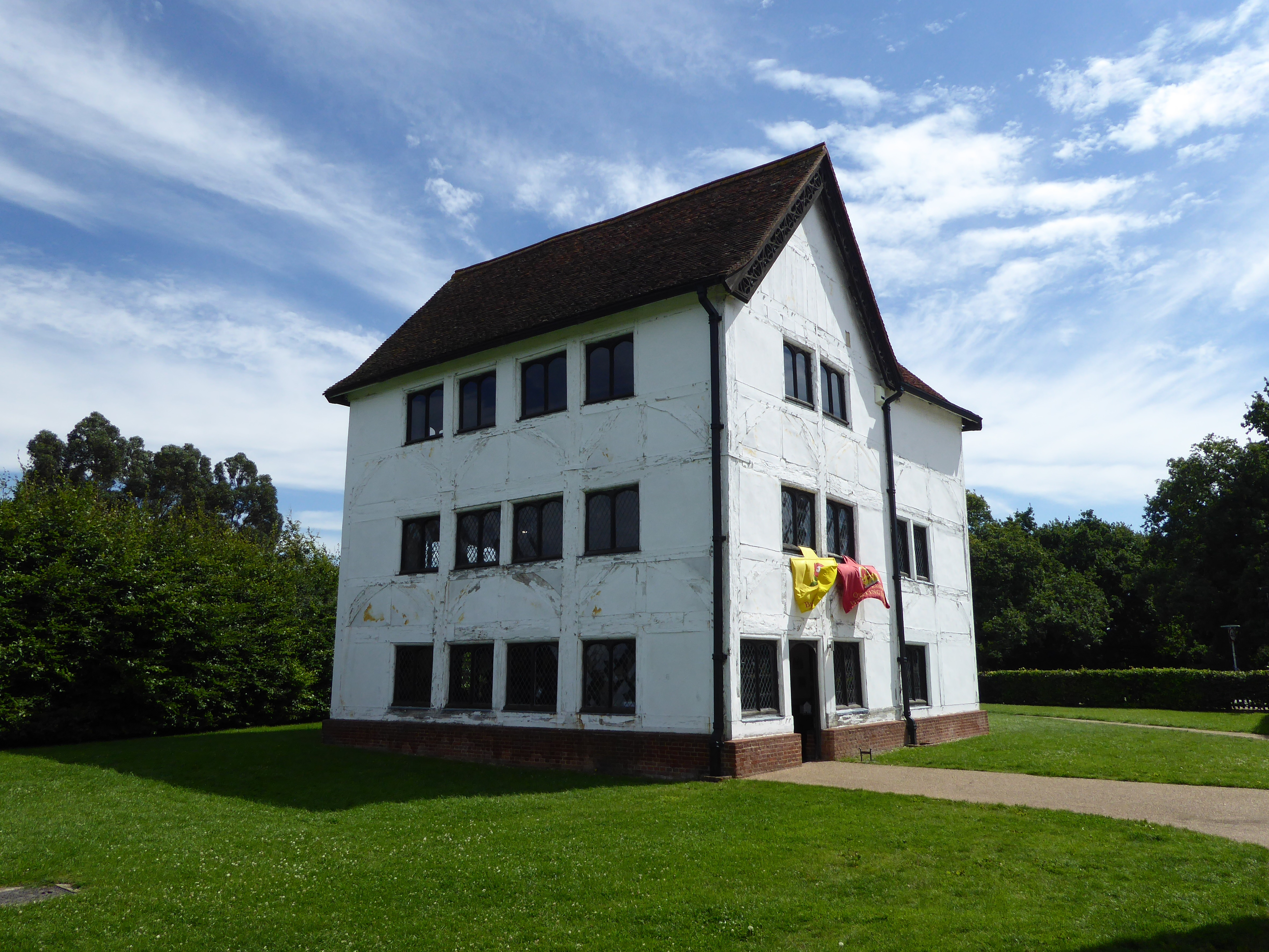

- Location within London Borough of Waltham Forest

General information
- Type: Former hunting lodge, now a museum
- Location: Chingford; London, E4, England
- Coordinates: 51°38′04″N 0°01′03″E

Listed Building – Grade II*
- Official name: Queen Elizabeth's Hunting Lodge
- Designated: 28 June 1954
- Reference no.: 1293481

Queen Elizabeth's Hunting Lodge is a Grade II* listed former hunting lodge, now a museum, on the edge of Epping Forest, at 8 Rangers Road, Chingford, London E4, in the London Borough of Waltham Forest, near Greater London's boundary with Essex.

== History ==
In 1542, Henry VIII commissioned the building, then known as Great Standing, from which to view the deer chase at Chingford; it was completed in 1543. The building was renovated in 1589 for Elizabeth I. The former lodge, now a three-storey building, has been extensively restored and is now a museum, which has been managed by the City of London Corporation since 1960. Admission is free.

There is a smaller hunting lodge, "The Little Standing", about a mile away in Loughton, part of the Warren, the Epping Forest HQ.

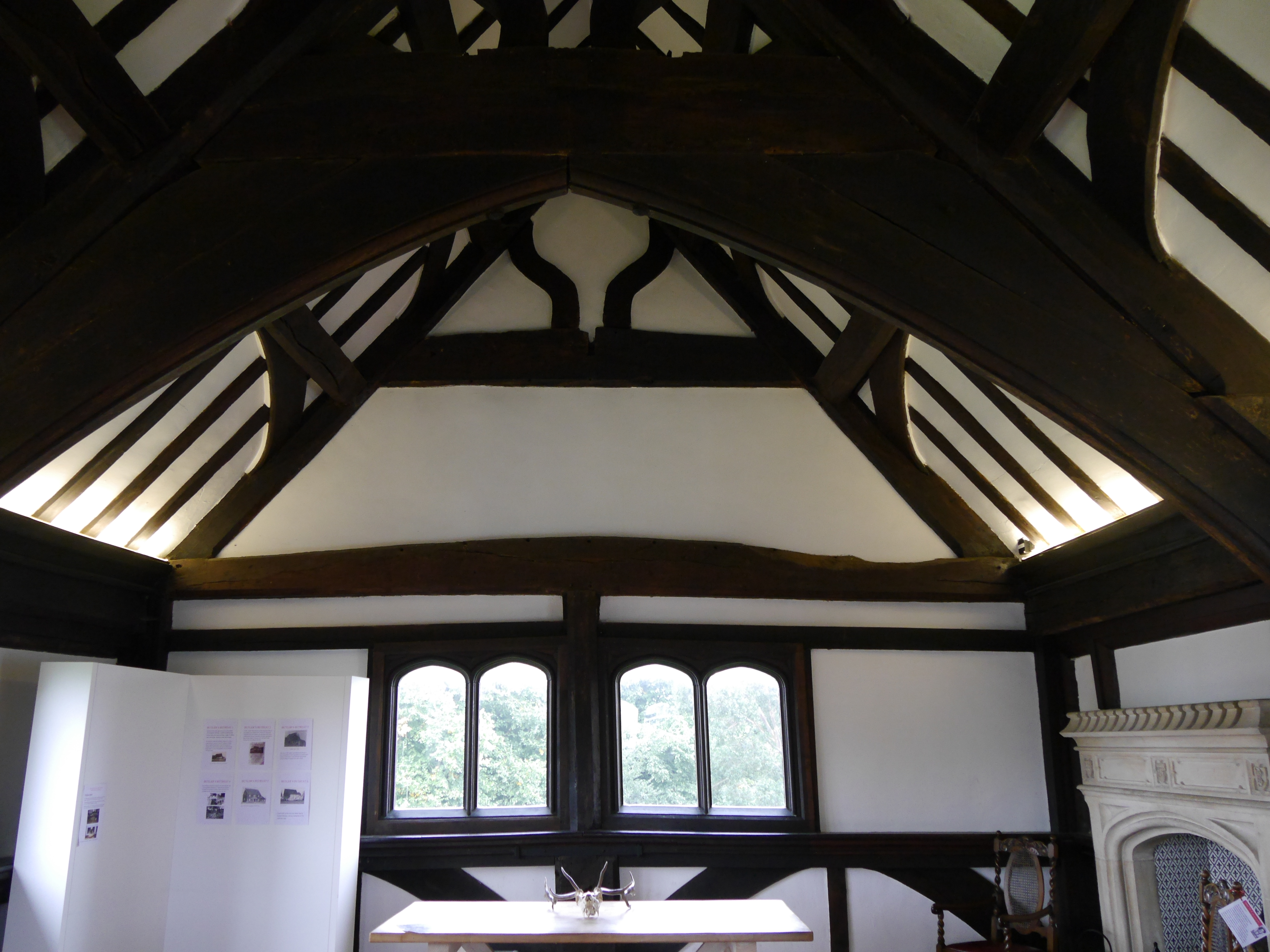
Lodge interior
