= St Peter and St Paul, Chingford =

Coordinates: 51.631192°N 0.001201°E

St Peter & St Paul Parish Church, Chingford
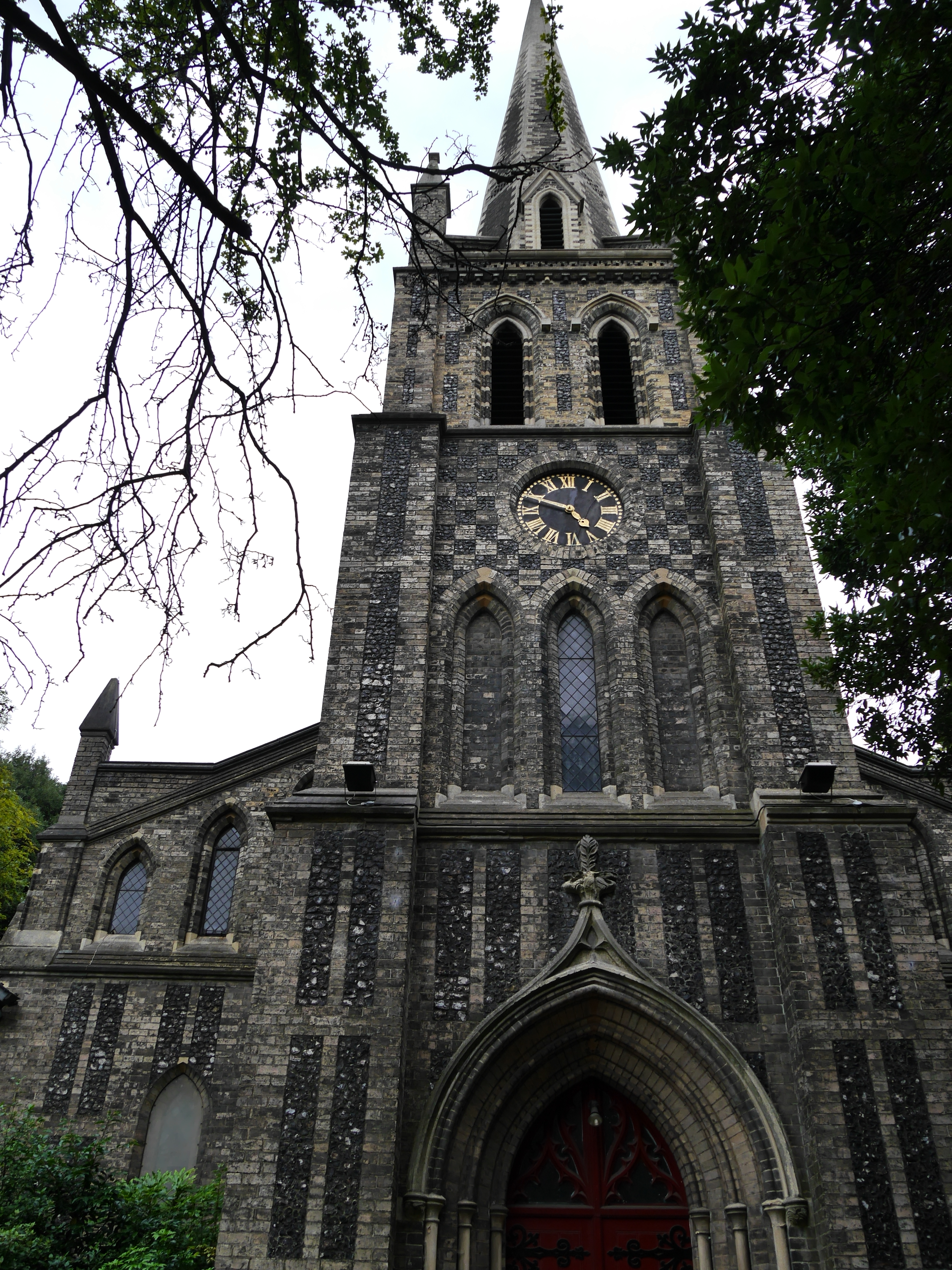
- St Peter & St Paul Parish Church, Chingford
- Location: Chingford, London, E4 7EN
- Country: England
- Denomination: Church of England
- Churchmanship: Anglo-Catholic
- Website: parishofchingford.org.uk

History
- Status: Active

Architecture
- Functional status: Parish church
- Heritage designation: Grade II* listed

Administration
- Diocese: Diocese of Chelmsford
- Archdeaconry: Archdeaconry of West Ham
- Parish: Chingford

Clergy
- Rector: The Rev'd Darren McCallig

St Peter and St Paul is a Church of England parish church in Chingford, London. The church is a Grade II* listed building.

== History ==
It was built in 1844 by the architect Lewis Vulliamy, and the eastern parts were added in 1903 by Sir Arthur Blomfield. It was paid for with £5,000 of his own money by Robert Boothby Heathcote, the then rector of All Saints, Chingford, who was concerned about the poor condition of that church.

On 28 June 1954, the church was designated a Grade II* listed building.

=== Present day ===
The parish of Chingford is in the Archdeaconry of West Ham of the Diocese of Chelmsford. The parish worships in the Anglo-Catholic tradition of the Church of England.

== Notable clergy ==
- Maxwell Hutchinson, architect, serves as parish deacon since 2016

== Gallery ==
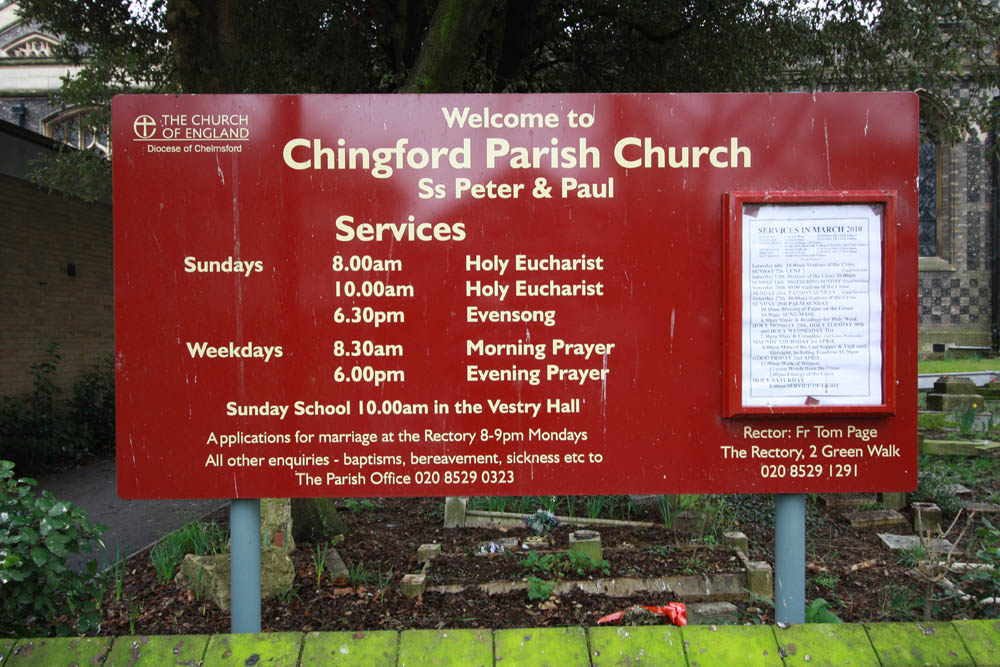
Notice board

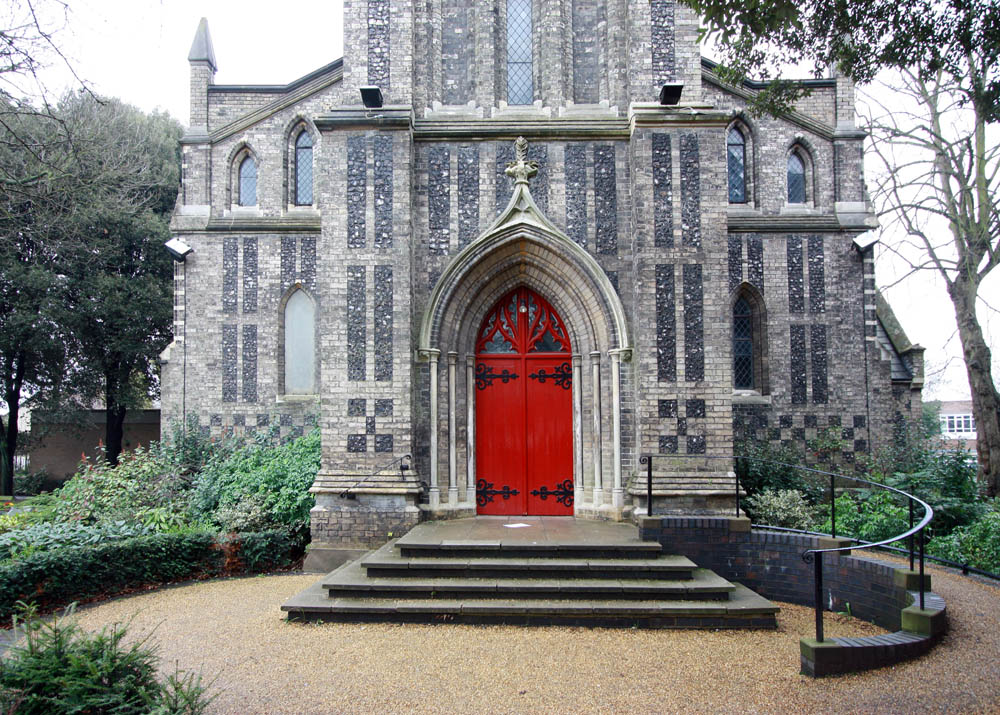
Front of the church

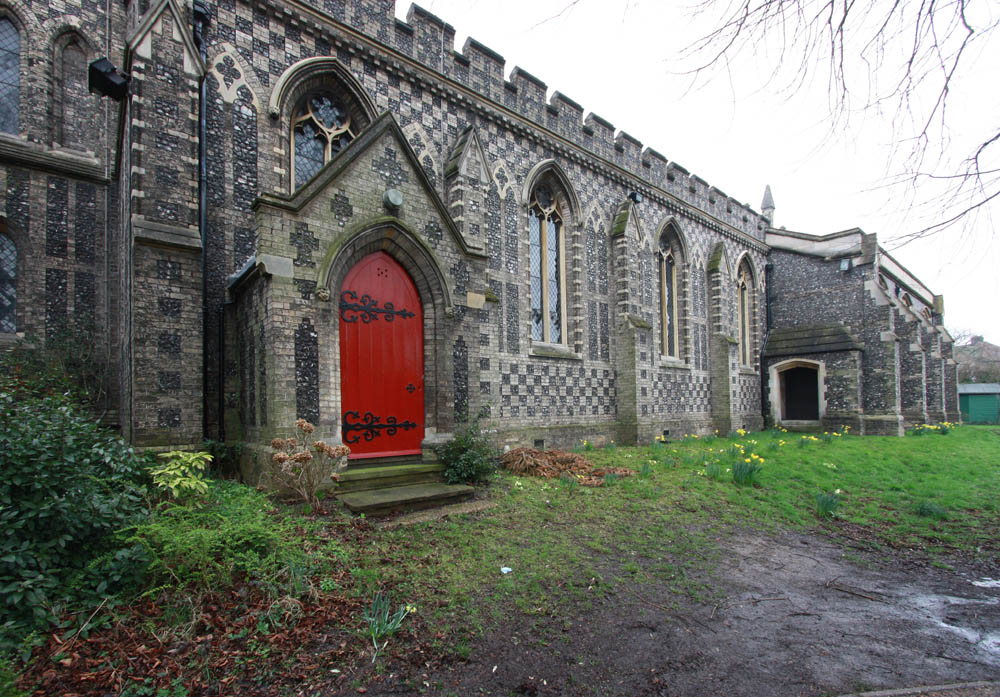
Side of the church

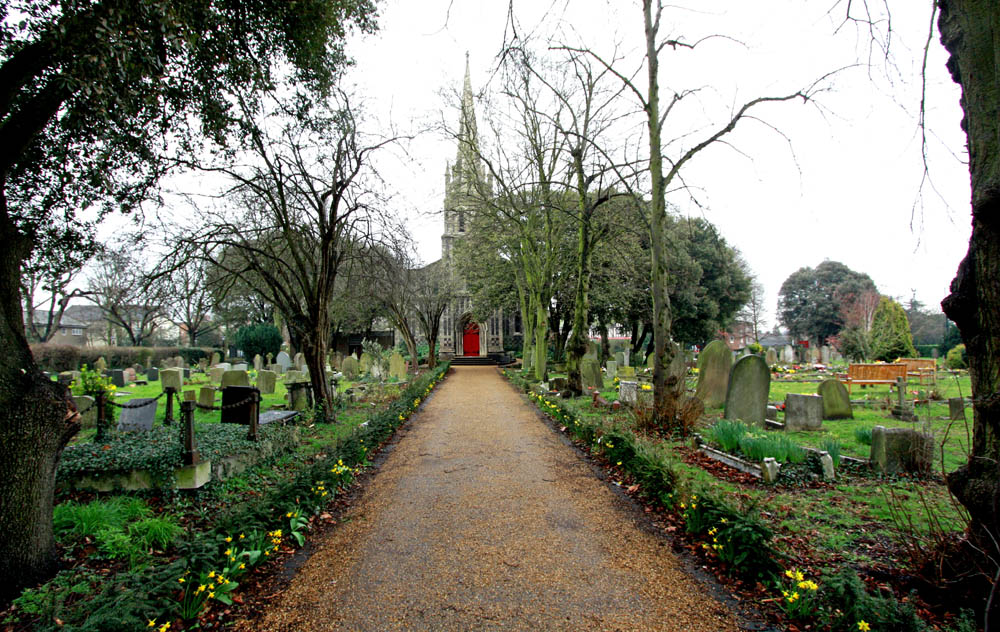
Graveyard
