= Friday Hill, London =

Housing estate in Chingford, London, England

Coordinates: 51.625956°N 0.007854°E

Friday Hill
- Location within Greater London
- London borough: Waltham Forest
- Ceremonial county: Greater London
- Region: London
- Country: England
- Sovereign state: United Kingdom
- Post town: LONDON
- Postcode district: E4
- Dialling code: 020
- Police: Metropolitan
- Fire: London
- Ambulance: London
- London Assembly: North East

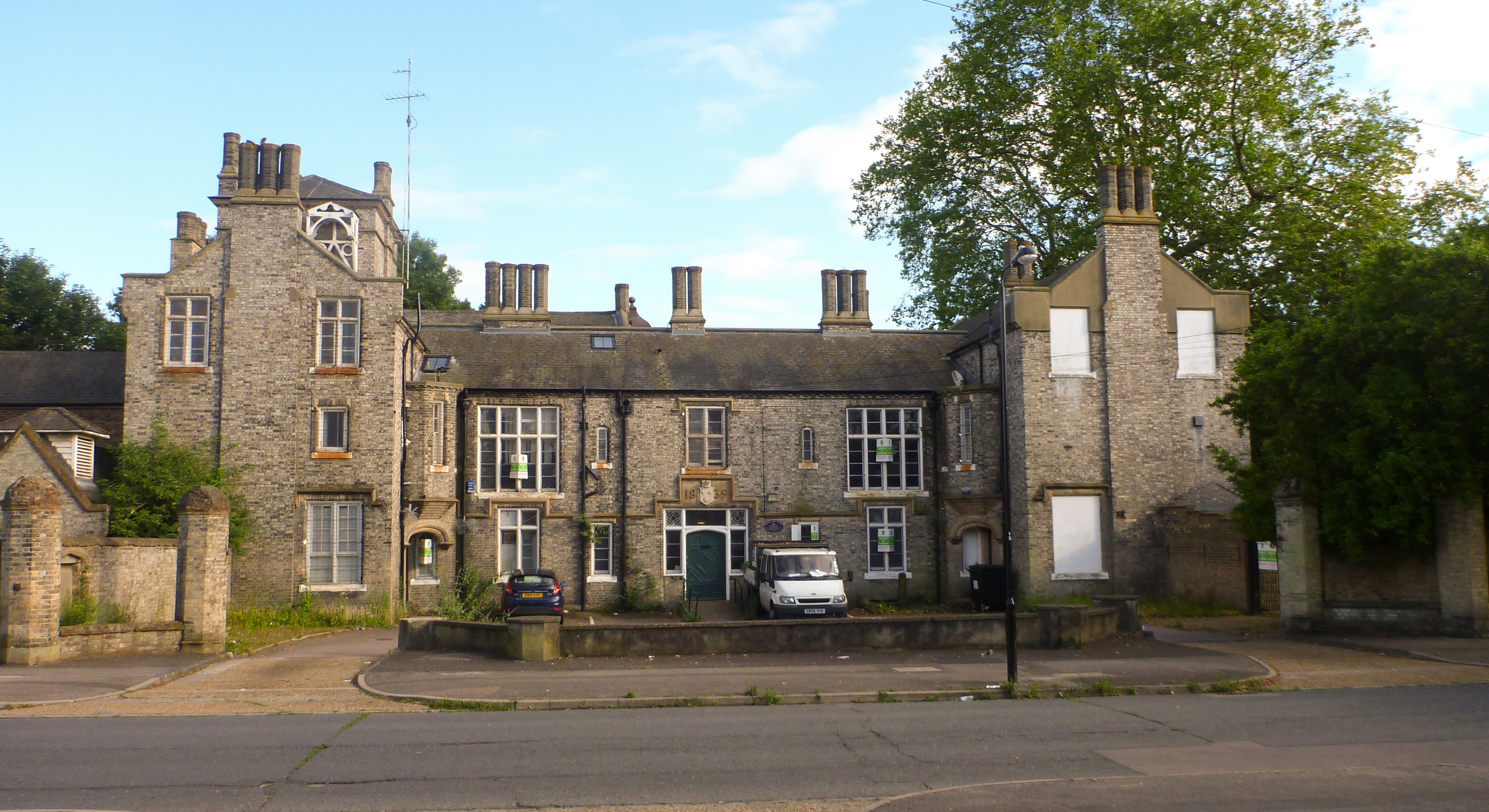
Friday Hill House

Friday Hill is a housing estate in Chingford (in the London Borough of Waltham Forest; OS Grid Reference TQ391933), named after the hill of the same name, lying north of Chingford Hatch. It takes its name from a John Friday who held land there in the fifteenth century; prior to this, it was known as Jackatt Hill.

Friday Hill House, on the crest of the hill, designed by the architect Lewis Vulliamy (1791–1871), was built in 1839. It served as the manor house of the Heathcote family, replacing an earlier Jacobean house on the site (built in 1608). The manor house had farmland of 160 acres (0.65 km^{2}). Louisa Boothby-Heathcote (1854–1940), who had succeeded as lady of the manor in 1915, was the last resident of the house. London County Council later acquired the land from the Heathcote family and developed housing on the site.

The house was used by the Chingford Community Association from the late 1940s until 2006 when the London Borough of Waltham Forest Council's Adult Education Service (CLaSS) took it over, displacing the community centre to a timber panelled building in the grounds and facing Weale Road to the rear. The house was used for Adult Education until 2012 when the Education Service consolidated into other buildings and Friday Hill House was put up for sale. It is a Grade II listed building.

According to legend, King Charles II is said to have knighted a loin of beef ("Sir Loin") at Friday Hill; however, there are other places that also claim this honour, and the story is generally assumed to be apocryphal. The pub on Friday Hill, now called The Dovecote, in the past has traded as "The Sirloin" (before the estate was sold) and Little Friday Hill House.

The pop group Friday Hill took its name from the area, the group's members having grown up here.
