= All Saints, Chingford =

Church in Chingford, London, England

Coordinates: 51.622499°N 0.016980°W

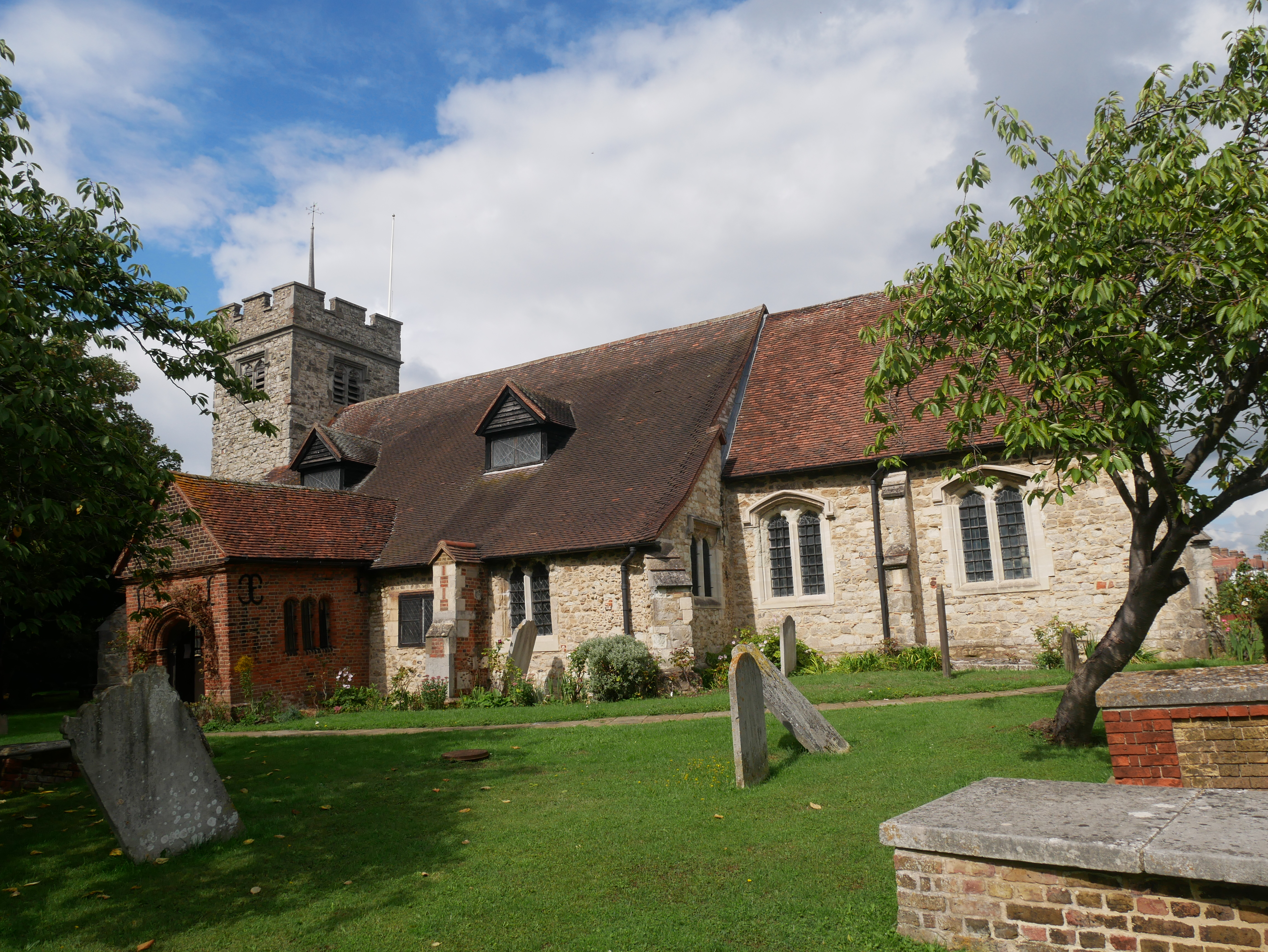
All Saints, Chingford, viewed from the south.

The Church of All Saints, Chingford, also known as Chingford Old Church, is a Grade II* listed Church of England church at Old Church Road, Chingford, London E4. Parts of the church date back to the 12th and 13th centuries, but it now forms part of the parish of St Peter and St Paul, Chingford, which took over its role as the parish church in 1844. The church stands on the summit of Chingford Mount and has views westwards towards the Lee Valley Reservoir Chain.

== History ==
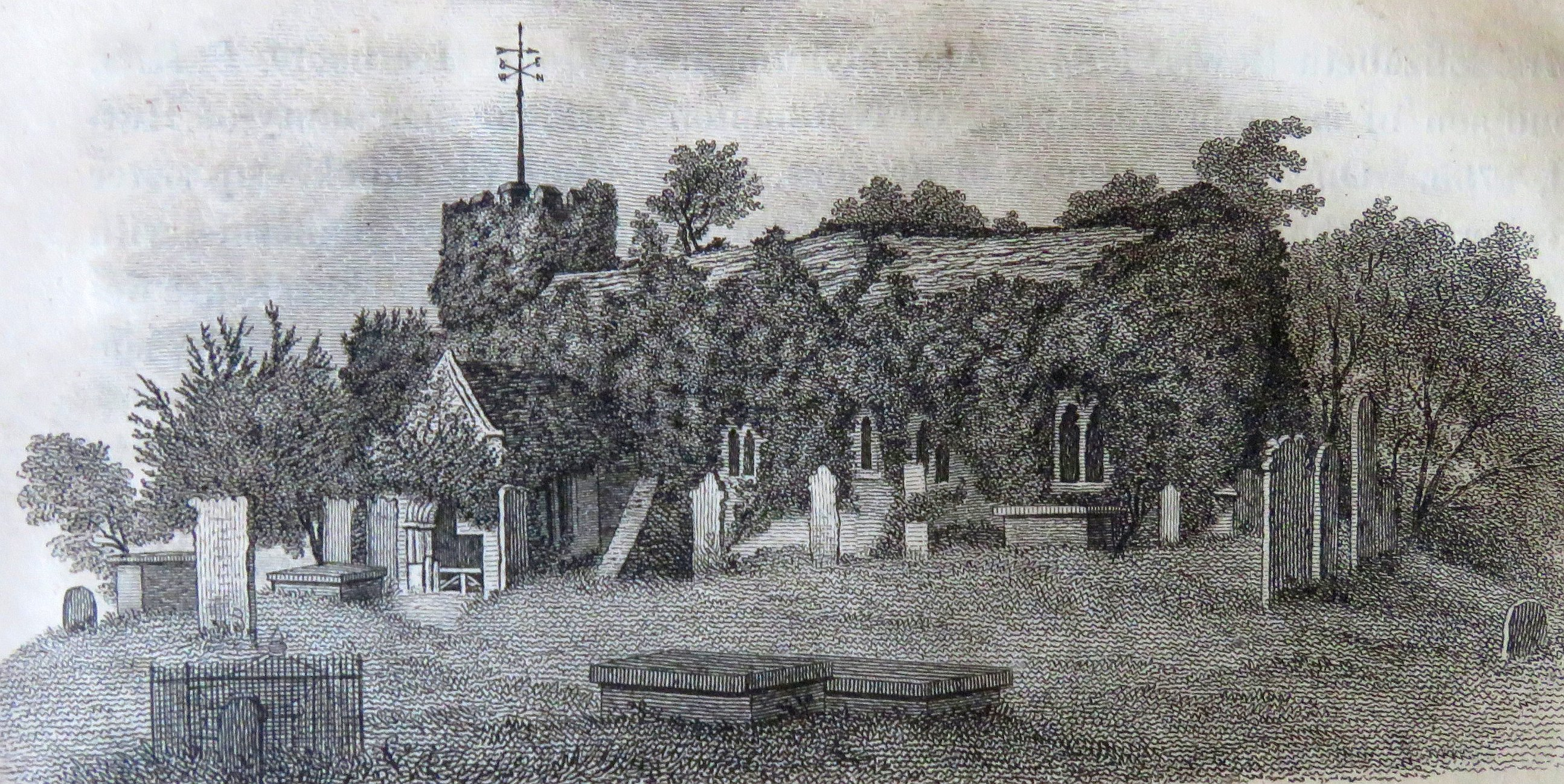
An early 19th century view of All Saints, showing the ivy which led to it being known as the "green church".

The first mention of the church was in 1181 when the advowson (the right to nominate the parish priest) was given to the local lord of the manor, although between 1207 and 1308, that right was held by the Knights Templars. The north wall of the nave probably dates from the 12th century, while the south aisle and arcade are from the late 13th century. The bell tower was added in about 1400. A will of 1460 mentions the construction of a new chancel, and another in 1467 provided for the repair of the aisle. A porch was built early in the 16th century. In 1547, the churchwardens had to pawn a chalice and cross to replace the roof and make other repairs.

In 1644, the rector, John Russell, was dismissed for "cursing, swearing, and gaming", but was reinstated in 1660 and remained in the parish until his death 28 years later. In 1768, the antiquarian Philip Morant described an unusual custom of the parish. An estate in Chingford called Scotts Mayhews or Brindwoods was held by the church and a ground rent of £24 was payable annually by the owner to the rector. When a new owner took over the property, a curious ceremony took place:

The owner of the estate, with his wife, manservant and maidservant, each single on a horse, come to the Parsonage; where the Owner does his homage and pays his relief, in manner following. He blows three blasts on his horn: carries a hawk on his fist: his servant has a greyhound in a slip; both for the use of the Rector that day. He receives a chicken for his hawk, a peck of oats for his horse, a loaf of bread for his greyhound. They all dine, after which the master blows three blasts on his horn and they all depart.

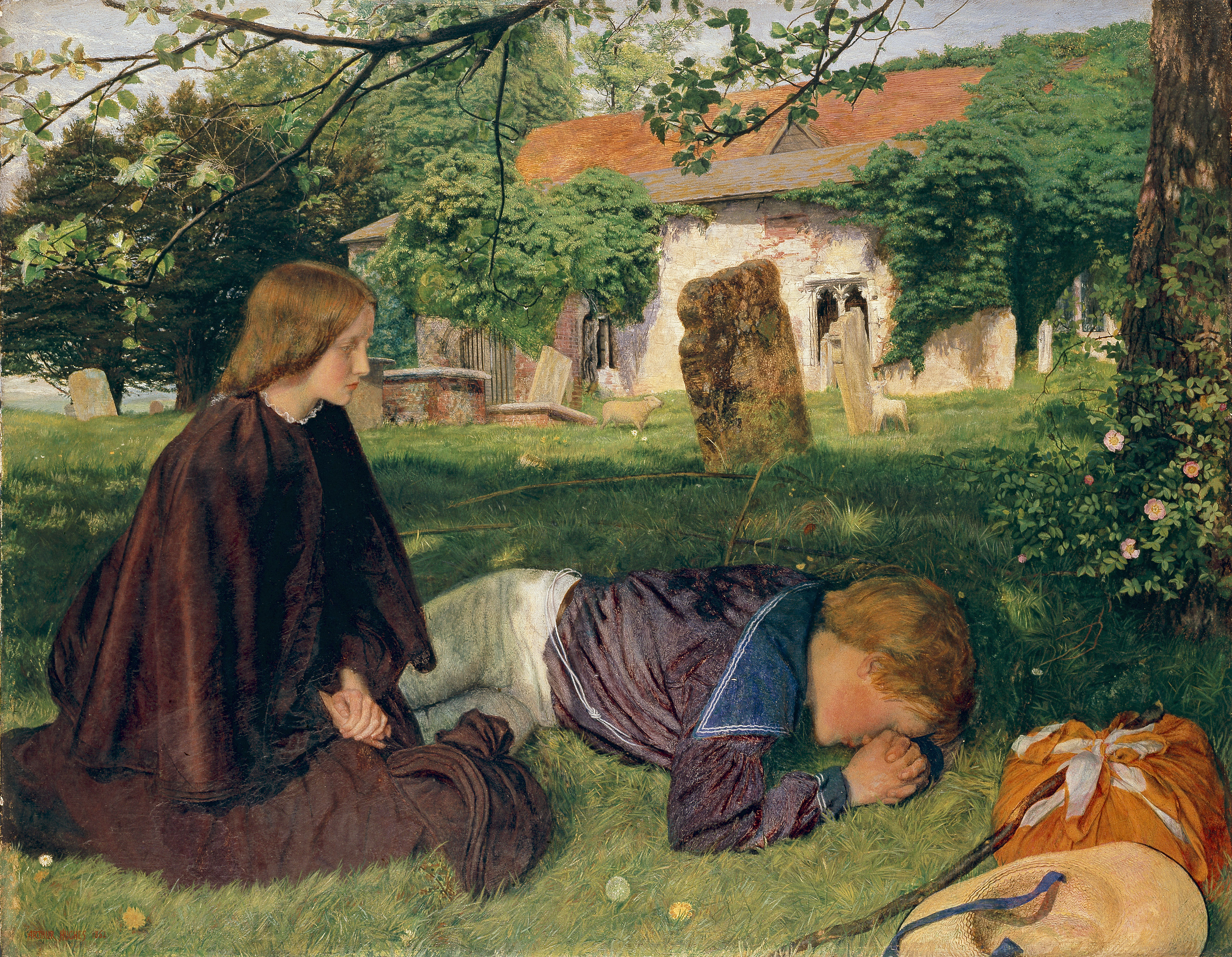
Home from Sea by Arthur Hughes was painted in the summer of 1856 in the churchyard at All Saints, Chingford.

In 1397, it was recorded that the church was dedicated to All Saints, but by 1710, it had changed to Saint Peter and Saint Paul. However, when a new church was built for the growing parish in 1844 at Chingford Green, that dedication was transferred to the new building and the old church became known as All Saints again. When the new church opened, the font, bells and other fixtures were transferred there and All Saints was only used for occasional services. Although the building had been kept in good repair, by the 19th century it was covered in ivy and was known as the "green church". This gave it a picturesque appearance popular with artists; perhaps the best known depiction of All Saints being Home from Sea by Arthur Hughes, which was painted in 1856 and is now at the Ashmolean Museum in Oxford.

In 1904, the roof of the nave and south aisle collapsed and in 1905 the chancel only was repaired and most of the ivy was removed. New building in the area meant that there was a need for chapel of ease and in 1930, a restoration was completed reusing much of the old material, with the aid of a donation of £6,000 from Miss Louisa Heathcote. The architect was C. C. Winmill. The three bells, dated 1626, 1657, and 1835, were returned to the church along with many of the old monuments that had been removed in 1844. The oldest of these is a slab containing the indents of brasses to Robert Rampston (1585) and his wife Margaret (1590).

Two of the three churchbells were cast by the Whitechapel Bell Foundry, with the third by Oldfield of Hertford.

The church holds regular services and its hall is used by many different societies.
