= Grade II listed buildings in the London Borough of Waltham Forest =

This page is a partial list of listed Grade II on the National Heritage List for England in the London Borough of Waltham Forest.

Name	Location	Type	Completed (Note: The date given is the date used by Historic England as significant for the initial building or that of an important part in the structure's description.)	Date designated	Grid ref. (Note: The grid reference is based on the British national grid reference system, sometimes known as OSGB36, used by the Ordnance Survey.) Geo-coordinates	Entry number (Note: The "List Entry Number" is a unique number assigned to each listed building and scheduled monument by Historic England.)	Image
3, High Elms	Woodford	House	early 19th century	4 July 1973	TQ 40029 92160	1065585	3, High Elms
143, Whipps Cross Road E11, Leytonstone, London	Leytonstone	House	mid- to late-18th century	24 February 1987	TQ 39494 88319	1065567	Upload Photo
807, Leyton High Road	Leyton	House	early 18th century	22 October 1990	TQ 37930 88029	1065572	Upload Photo
Bakers Almshouses	Lea Bridge Road, Leyton E10	Almshouses	1866	27 September 1971	TQ376880; 51°34′30″N 0°00′55″W	1191128	Bakers Almshouses More images
Bakers Almshouses railings and gates	Lea Bridge Road, Leyton E10	Gates	mid- to late-19th century	24 February 1987	TQ3769388036	1065594	Bakers Almshouses railings and gates More images
Brookscroft	590 Forest Road, Walthamstow	House	c. 1760	19 October 1951	TQ 37754 89742	1065581	Brookscroft More images
The Bull and Crown Public House	The Green, Chingford E4 7ES	Public house	1898	24 February 1987	TQ3857694276; 51°37′49″N 0°00′03″E	1065584	The Bull and Crown Public House More images
Butler's Retreat	Rangers Road, Chingford E4 7QH	Building	early 19th century	30 October 1986	TQ3979094780; 51°38′04″N 0°01′07″E	1065599	Butler's Retreat More images
Carbis Cottage	The Green, Chingford E4 7EN	Cottage	17th century	23 December 1982	TQ3866894434; 51°37′54″N 0°00′08″E	1357629	Carbis Cottage More images
Central Parade	Hoe Street and Church Hill E17	Commercial building	built 1957–581934-5	18 October 2017	TQ3731389254; 51°35′07″N 0°01′09″W	1444899	Central Parade More images
Chingford War Memorial	King's Head Hill and The Ridgeway, Chingford E4	War memorial cross	1921	20 January 2014	TQ3843094415; 51°37′53″N 0°00′05″W	1418307	Chingford War Memorial More images
Church of St Peter and St Paul churchyard gates and gatepiers (north of church)	The Green, Chingford E4	Gates	mid-19th century	24 February 1987	TQ 38531 94391	1065583	Upload Photo
Church of St Saviour	Markhouse Road, Walthamstow E17	Church	1874	29 March 1985	TQ 36691 87910	1065595	Church of St Saviour More images
Clock House	Wood Street, Walthamstow E17 3NQ	House	early 18th century	19 October 1951	TQ 38617 89020	1065569	Upload Photo
Emmanuel Church Hall Emmanuel Parish Hall	Hitcham Road, Leyton E10	Church	1906	24 February 1987	TQ 36663 87449	1065589	Upload Photo
Ferry Boat Inn	Ferry Lane, Walthamstow.	Public house					Ferry Boat Inn
Fetter Lane Congregational Chapel	Langthorne Road, Leyton E11	Church	1899	24 February 1987	TQ 38571 86063	1065592	Fetter Lane Congregational Chapel More images
Friday Hill House	Simmons Lane, Friday Hill E4	House	19th century	22 October 1990	TQ3902693567; 51°37′26″N 0°00′25″E	1250869	Friday Hill House More images
K6 Telephone Kiosk adjacent to Carnegie Library, Lea Bridge Road	Lea Bridge Road, Leyton	Telephone booth	1935	16 June 1988	TQ 37059 87611	1065571	Upload Photo
Leyton Town Hall	265 High Road, Leyton E10 5QN	Town hall	1895	1 August 1986	TQ 38205 86297	1065587	Leyton Town Hall More images
Leytonstone House	High Road, Leytonstone E11 1HR	House	probably 18th century	27 May 1954	TQ3974287771; 51°34′17″N 0°00′54″E	1065588	Leytonstone House More images
Lighthouse Methodist Church	Markhouse Road Walthamstow E17	Church	1893	19 April 2007	TQ 36600 88190		Lighthouse Methodist Church More images
Metal railing to Chingford Mill Pumping Station	Lower Hall Lane, Chingford	Fence	1895	2 August 1999	TQ 36279 92467	1065575	Upload Photo
Old Butchers Shop adjacent to Number 76	78 Wood Street, Walthamstow E17	Butcher shop	probably late 18th century	16 July 1984	TQ 38335 89711	1065568	Old Butchers Shop adjacent to Number 76 More images
Orford House Social Club	73 Orford Road, E17	Social club	early 19th century	7 May 1980	TQ 37709 88880	1065597	Orford House Social Club
Our Lady of Grace and St Teresa of Avila	1 King's Road, Chingford E4 7HP	Church	1930	16 July 1997	TQ3863594277; 51°37′49″N 0°00′06″E	1271998	Our Lady of Grace and St Teresa of Avila More images
Parish Church of Emmanuel	Lea Bridge Road, Leyton E10	Church	built 1934–35	24 February 1987	TQ3669587422; 51°34′09″N 0°01′45″W	1065593	Parish Church of Emmanuel More images
Pimp Hall Dovecote	Kings Road, Chingford E4	Dovecote	17th century	28 June 1954	TQ 38855 93819	1065591	Upload Photo
The Pump House	South Access Road, Walthamstow E17 8AX	House	19th century	26 October 1999	TQ3629688261; 51°34′36″N 0°02′04″W	1379203	The Pump House More images
St Andrew's Church, Leytonstone	Colworth Road, Leytonstone E11 1JD	Church	built 1887-1893	27 February 2006	TQ3921388201; 51°34′32″N 0°00′26″W	1391544	St Andrew's Church, Leytonstone More images
St Barnabas Parish Hall	St Barnabas Road, Walthamstow	Church hall	1902	24 February 1987	TQ 37253 88281	1065566	Upload Photo
St John the Baptist's Church, Leytonstone	High Road, Leytonstone E11 1HH	Parish Church	built 1832-1833	24 February 1987	TQ3946687459; 51°34′08″N 0°00′39″W	1357631	St John the Baptist's Church, Leytonstone More images
St Peter-in-the-Forest	Woodford New Road, Walthamstow E17 3PP	Church	1840	14 April 2009	TQ3908789497; 51°35′14″N 0°00′23″E	1393232	St Peter-in-the-Forest More images
Vestry House Museum	Vestry Road, Walthamstow E17 9NH	House	18th century	19 October 1951	TQ3777889118; 51°35′00″N 0°00′45″W	1191188	Vestry House Museum More images
Waltham Forest Town Hall	Forest Road E17 4JF	Building	20th century	9 March 1982	TQ3770589909; 51°35′28″N 0°00′49″W	1190868	Waltham Forest Town Hall More images
Walthamstow Tramway and offices and depot	Chingford Road, Walthamstow	Railroad depot	1905	3 August 1993	TQ 37316 90130	1065573	Walthamstow Tramway and offices and depot More images
Water Turbine House, Chingford Mill Pumping Station	Lower Hall Lane, Chingford	Pumping station	1891	2 August 1993	TQ 36245 92428	1065574	Upload Photo
West Ham Union Workhouse	Langthorne Road E11	Workhouse	built 1839-41	24 February 1987	TQ3901485919; 51°33′18″N 0°00′14″E	1191099	West Ham Union Workhouse
Woodford County High School For Girls	High Road, Woodford Green IG8 9LA	House (now a school)	1768	19 October 1951	TQ3987891783; 51°36′27″N 0°01′07″E	1191027	Woodford County High School For Girls More images

== See also ==
- Grade II* listed buildings in the London Borough of Waltham Forest
