= Grade II* listed buildings in the London Borough of Waltham Forest =

There are over 20,000 Grade II* listed buildings in England. This page is a list of these buildings in the London Borough of Waltham Forest.

== Buildings ==
Name	Location	Type	Completed (Note: The date given is the date used by Historic England as significant for the initial building or that of an important part in the structure's description.)	Date designated	Grid ref. (Note: Sometimes known as OSGB36, the grid reference is based on the British national grid reference system used by the Ordnance Survey.) Geo-coordinates	Entry number (Note: The "List Entry Number" is a unique number assigned to each listed building and scheduled monument by Historic England.)	Image
Walthamstow Granada	Walthamstow	Cinema, Public House	Late C20	24 February 1987	TQ3724389311; 51°35′09″N 0°01′14″W	1065590	Walthamstow Granada More images
Chestnuts House	Walthamstow	House	1745-7	19 October 1951	TQ3747988447; 51°34′41″N 0°01′03″W	1191062	Chestnuts House
Church of All Saints	Chingford	Parish Church	12th century	28 June 1954	TQ3737293382; 51°37′21″N 0°01′01″W	1065596	Church of All Saints More images
Church of St Barnabas and St James the Greater	Walthamstow	Church	1903	24 February 1981	TQ3722488298; 51°34′37″N 0°01′16″W	1065600	Church of St Barnabas and St James the Greater More images
Church of St Peter and St Paul	Chingford	Church	1844	28 June 1954	TQ3860494383; 51°37′52″N 0°00′04″E	1065582	Church of St Peter and St Paul More images
St Mary's Church, Leyton	Leyton	Parish Church	1658	27 May 1954	TQ3768186857; 51°33′50″N 0°00′54″W	1293623	St Mary's Church, Leyton More images
Parish Church of St Mary's	Walthamstow	Church	16th century	19 October 1951	TQ3784289229; 51°35′06″N 0°00′43″W	1357600	Parish Church of St Mary's More images
Leytonstone Library	Leytonstone	Library	1934	28 April 2014	TQ3943387392; 51°34′05″N 0°00′37″E	1418380	Leytonstone Library More images
Queen Elizabeth's Hunting Lodge	Chingford	Hunting Lodge	Early 16th century	28 June 1954	TQ3972494776; 51°38′04″N 0°01′03″E	1293481	Queen Elizabeth's Hunting Lodge More images
The United Free Church	Woodford Green	Church	1904	24 February 1987	TQ4001692188; 51°36′40″N 0°01′15″E	1081029	The United Free Church More images
The Water House, Lloyd Park (William Morris Gallery)	Walthamstow	House	1762	19 October 1951	TQ3722989902; 51°35′29″N 0°01′13″W	1065620	The Water House, Lloyd Park (William Morris Gallery) More images
Walnut Tree House	Leyton	House	Mid 16th century or earlier	27 May 1954	TQ3802787126; 51°33′58″N 0°00′36″W	1065586	Walnut Tree House More images
Walthamstow House (Corpus Christi School)	Walthamstow	House	Mid-18th century	19 October 1951	TQ3810189745; 51°35′23″N 0°00′28″W	1065601	Walthamstow House (Corpus Christi School) More images

== See also ==
- Grade II listed buildings in the London Borough of Waltham Forest
