= Richard Foster =

Richard Foster may refer to:

- Richard Foster (abolitionist) (1826–1901), founder of the Lincoln Institute in Jefferson City, Missouri
- Richard Foster (Alaska politician) (1946–2009), Democratic member of the Alaska House of Representatives
- Richard Foster (architect) (1919–2002), American modernist architect
- Richard Foster (Australian footballer), Australian rules footballer
- Richard Witty Foster (1856–1932), Australian politician
- Richard Foster (Royal Marines officer) (1879–1965)
- Richard Foster (Scottish footballer) (born 1985), Scottish football player
- Richard Foster (painter) (born 1945), British portrait painter
- Richard Foster (theologian) (fl. 2000s), Quaker religious leader and author
- Richard N. Foster (born 1941), managing partner, Foster Health Partners
- Richard Foster (philanthropist) (1822–1910), City of London merchant
- Richard Foster, a pen name of Kendell Foster Crossen (1910–1981), American writer
- Dick Foster (1934–2020), American football coach
- Skip Foster (1960–2024), American football coach

== Characters ==
- Richard Foster (The Walking Dead)

== See also ==
- Richard Forster (disambiguation)
