= List of public art in the London Borough of Waltham Forest =

This is a list of public art in the London Borough of Waltham Forest.

== Chingford ==
Image	Title / subject	Location and coordinates	Date	Artist / designer	Architect / other	Type	Designation	Notes
More images	Chingford War Memorial	The Ridgeway/King's Head Hill 51.6316°N 0.0012°W	1921	—N/a	W. A. Lewis	Celtic cross	Grade II	Unveiled September 1921 by Lord Lambourne.
	Chingford Mount War Memorial	Albert Crescent 51.6172°N 0.0178°W	?	?	—N/a	Obelisk	—N/a	

== Leyton ==
Image	Title / subject	Location and coordinates	Date	Artist / designer	Architect / other	Type	Designation	Notes
	War memorial	Churchyard of Emmanuel Parish Church 51.5690°N 0.0291°W	1922	Probably Judd Thomas & Co.	—N/a	Memorial cross	Grade II	
	Statue of Laurie Cunningham	Buckingham Road	2017	Graham Ibbeson	—N/a	Statue	—N/a	

== Leytonstone ==
Image	Title / subject	Location and coordinates	Date	Artist / designer	Architect / other	Type	Designation	Notes
More images	Leytonstone War Memorial	Harrow Green, Harrow Road 51.5582°N 0.0071°E	1925	—N/a	William Griffiths & Co. Ltd. (masons)	Pillar	Grade II	Unveiled 21 November 1925 by Lieutenant General Sir Francis Lloyd.
	Time Terminus	Leytonstone bus station 51.5682°N 0.0073°E	1999	Lodewyk Pretor	—N/a	Sculpture	—N/a	
	Leaf Memory	Grove Road 51.5696°N 0.0130°E	2001	Stephen Duncan	—N/a	Sculpture	—N/a	
	The Birds Alfred Hitchcock	High Road	2014	Anna Mills and Mateusz Odrobny	—N/a	Mural	—N/a	

== Walthamstow ==
Image	Title / subject	Location and coordinates	Date	Artist / designer	Architect / other	Type	Designation	Notes
	Ionic capital	Outside Vestry House Museum 51.58397°N 0.01255°W	1810s	—N/a	Robert Smirke	Architectural fragment	—N/a	Originally formed part of the General Post Office building at St Martin Le Grand in the City of London. When that building was demolished in 1912 this fragment was purchased by the stone mason Frank Mortimer, who gave it to the Municipal Borough of Walthamstow. It has stood on its present site since 1954.
More images	Walthamstow War Memorial	Waltham Forest Town Hall 51.5906°N 0.0124°W	1922	?	?	War memorial with sculpture	Grade II	Unveiled July 1922.
More images	Five figures and reliefs	Waltham Forest Town Hall	1941	John Francis Kavanagh	Philip Hepworth	Architectural sculpture	Grade II	
	Comedy and Tragedy heads	Walthamstow Assembly Hall	1941	John Francis Kavanagh	Philip Hepworth	Architectural sculpture	Grade II	
More images	William Morris tile motif	Walthamstow Central tube station, Victoria line platforms	c. 1968	Julia Black	—N/a	Ceramic mural	—N/a	
More images	Black horse tile motif	Blackhorse Road tube station, Victoria line platforms	c. 1968	Hans Ernest Unger	—N/a	Ceramic mural	—N/a	
	Shying Horse	Outside Blackhorse Road tube station	1968	David McFall	—N/a	Mural	—N/a	
	Pagoda Monoform	Lloyd Park 51.5931°N 0.0207°W	1991	Jack Gardner	—N/a	Sculpture	—N/a	
	21 Arches Instead of a Gate	Woodside Academy	2014	Cath Campbell	—N/a	Sculpture	—N/a	
	Underline	Blackhorse Road tube station	c. 2015–2016	Giles Round, Design Work Leisure	—N/a	Ceramic mural	—N/a	
	Beryl Swain – Wood Street Racer	110 Wood Street, adjacent to The Dukes Head pub 51.5882°N 0.0043°W	2019	Helen Bur	—N/a	Mural	—N/a	The mural is very close to the junction with Marlowe Road, Swain's place of birth.
More images	Statue of Harry Kane	Peter May Sports Centre	2020	Sculpture Machine	—N/a	Statue	—N/a	Unveiled 18 November 2024. Rejected for a site outside Chingford station in a risk assessment, the statue was in storage for four years until this location was chosen.
	Protection	St Peter-in-the-Forest 51.5870°N 0.0061°E	2021	Phlegm	—N/a	Mural	—N/a	

== Whipps Cross ==
Image	Title / subject	Location and coordinates	Date	Artist / designer	Architect / other	Type	Designation	Notes
	Territorial Army War Memorial	Lea Bridge Roundabout 51.5813°N 0.0008°E	1921	?	—N/a	Celtic cross	Grade II	Unveiled 12 November 1961. Moved to its current location in the 1950s.
