= Ferry Boat Inn =

The Ferry Boat Inn may refer to:

- Ferry Boat Inn, Walthamstow, in London, England
- The Ferry Boat Inn, in Norwich, Norfolk, England
- The Old Ferry Boat Inn, in Holywell, Huntingdonshire, Cambridgeshire, England

== See also ==
- Gray's Ferry Tavern, a tavern in present-day Philadelphia, Pennsylvania
