= The Ancient House, Walthamstow =

Medieval house in London

The Ancient House
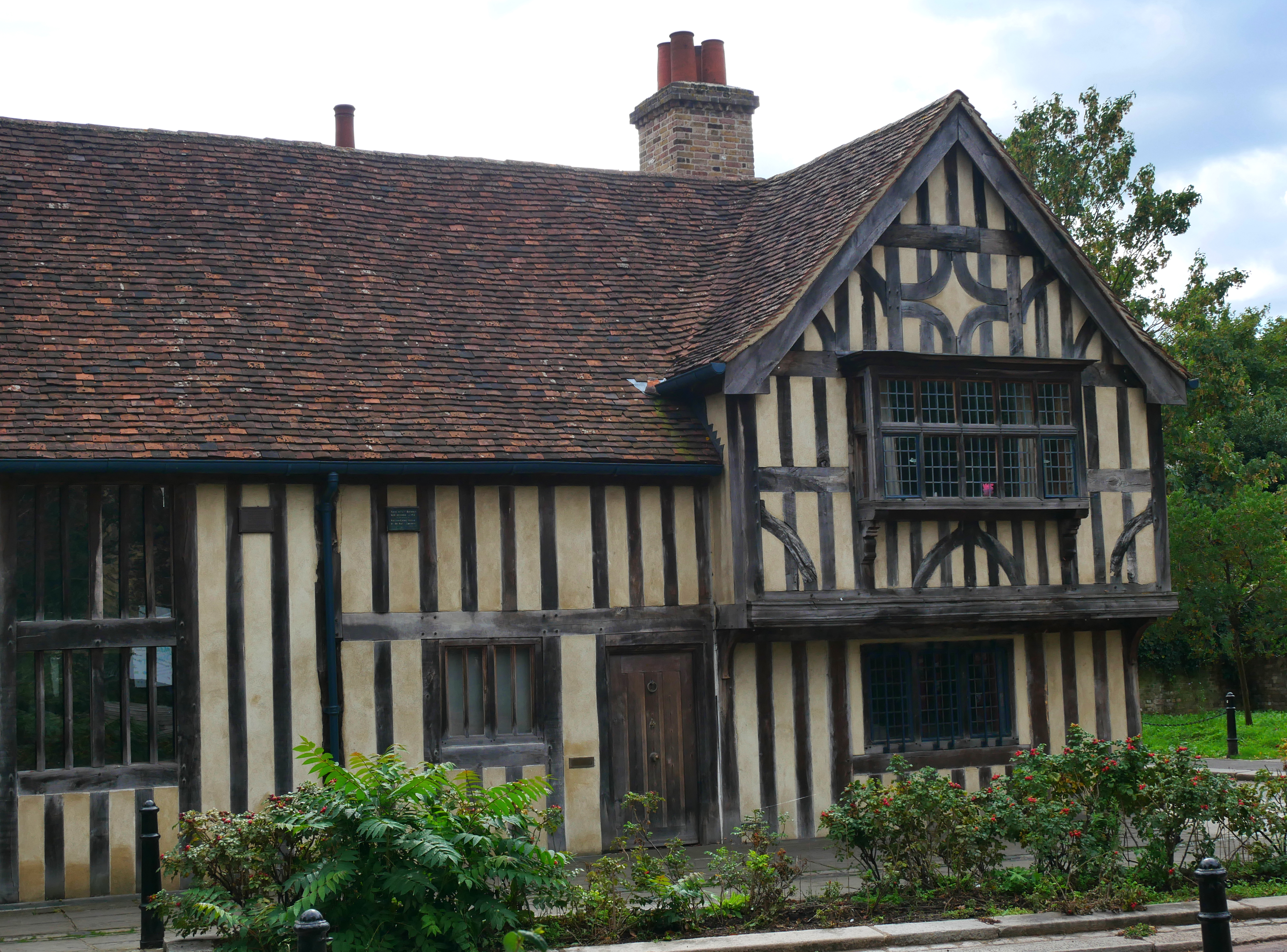
- Interactive map of the The Ancient House area

General information
- Type: Residential
- Location: Walthamstow, London, England
- Coordinates: 51°35′04″N 0°00′41″W
- Completed: c. 1435

Listed Building – Grade II
- Official name: The Ancient House
- Designated: 19 October 1951
- Reference no.: 1190795

The Ancient House, Walthamstow is a Grade II listed house in Walthamstow, London. It was built in the 15th century, possibly around 1435, in what was then Essex, with its age giving it a claim to being the oldest house in what is today Greater London.

The Ancient House was originally a timber framed hall house but today has been split up into four separate dwellings. Much of the exterior including many of the exposed timber frames remain original. It is considered both architecturally and historically significant being a rare example of early domestic English architecture.

The house underwent restoration in 1934 which revealed the medieval timber-frame underneath a protective weatherboarding. Work on the house during this restoration including wattle and daub fillings of its wings being replaced by brick. On top of being a listed building it is also part of the Walthamstow Village conservation area.
