= St Barnabas Church, Walthamstow =

Coordinates: 51.576846°N 0.021325°W

Church of St Barnabas and St James the Greater, Walthamstow
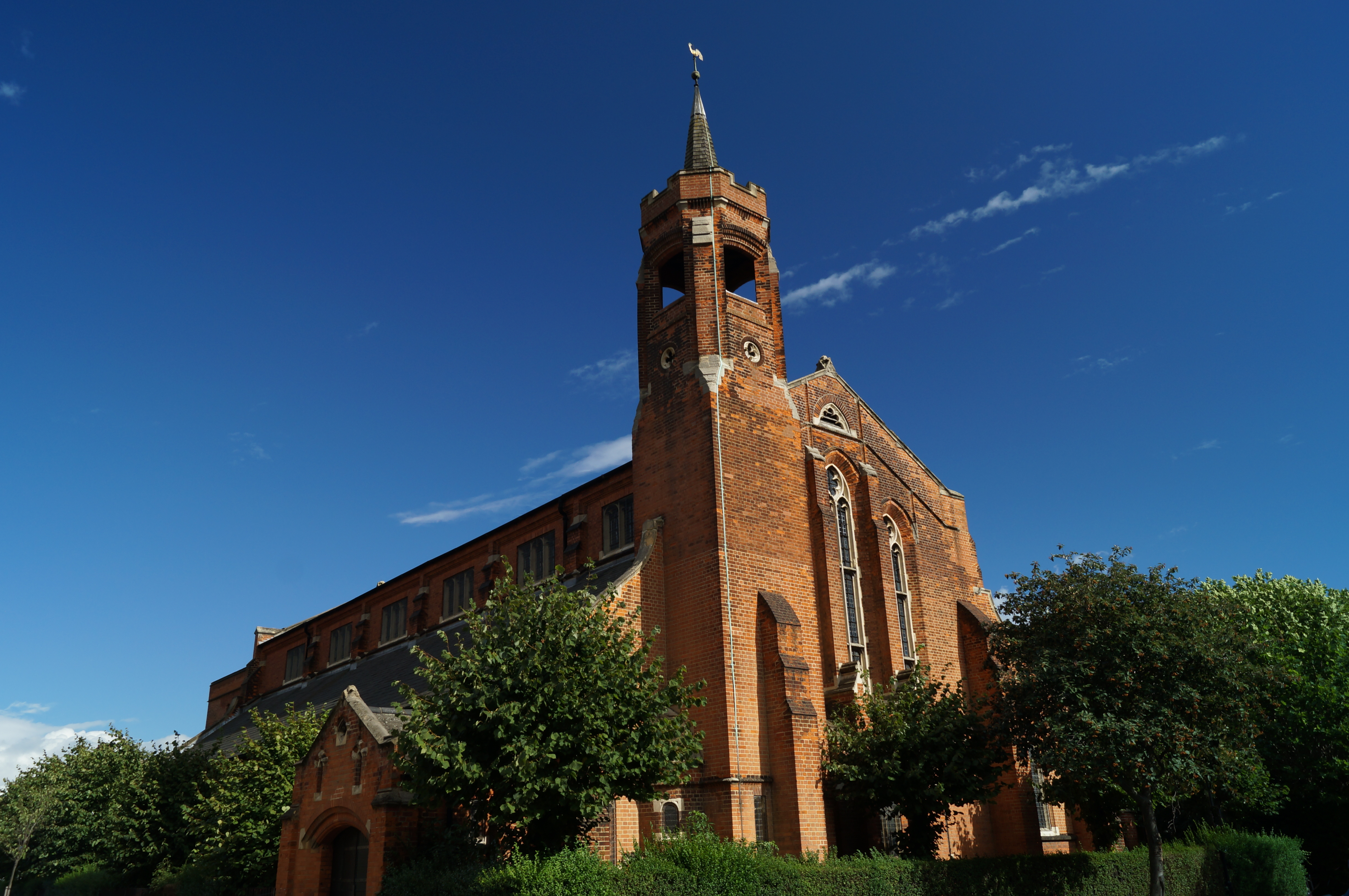
- View of the western end of St Barnabas Church
- Church of St Barnabas and St James the Greater, Walthamstow
- Location: Barnabas Road Walthamstow, London, E17 8JZ
- Country: England
- Denomination: Church of England
- Website: https://www.saintbarnabaswalthamstow.com/

History
- Status: Active
- Founded: 1900
- Dedication: Barnabas and James the Great
- Dedicated: 7 November 1903

Architecture
- Functional status: Parish church
- Heritage designation: Grade II* listed
- Designated: 24 February 1981
- Architect: William Douglas Caröe
- Style: Arts and Crafts / Perpendicular Gothic
- Years built: 1902-1903

Administration
- Diocese: Chelmsford
- Archdeaconry: West Ham

The Church of St Barnabas and St James the Greater, Walthamstow, is an Edwardian era Church of England parish church in Walthamstow, London Borough of Waltham Forest. It is a Grade II* listed building.

== History ==
The church originated in 1900 when an iron mission church was erected on a plot of land in the parish of St Saviour in Markhouse Road, and a separate ecclesiastical parish was created for the church in 1901. The land for the church was donated by Richard Foster, a wealthy City of London merchant who had supported the building of several other new churches in the area; he also funded the construction of a permanent church building, church hall and vicarage, intended to serve the residents of the new Warner Estate.

The church was built between 1902 and 1903 to the design by W. D. Caröe, in the Arts and Crafts style of Perpendicular Gothic, and was dedicated on 7 November 1903 by Edgar Jacob, the Bishop of St Albans.

In 1961 the parish of St Barnabas was united with that of St James the Greater Church in St James Street, Walthamstow, which had closed in the previous year and was subsequently demolished. A new chapel dedicated to St James was formed in the south aisle of St Barnabas, which included the altar from the former church. In 1981, the church was given grade II* listed building status.

== Gallery ==
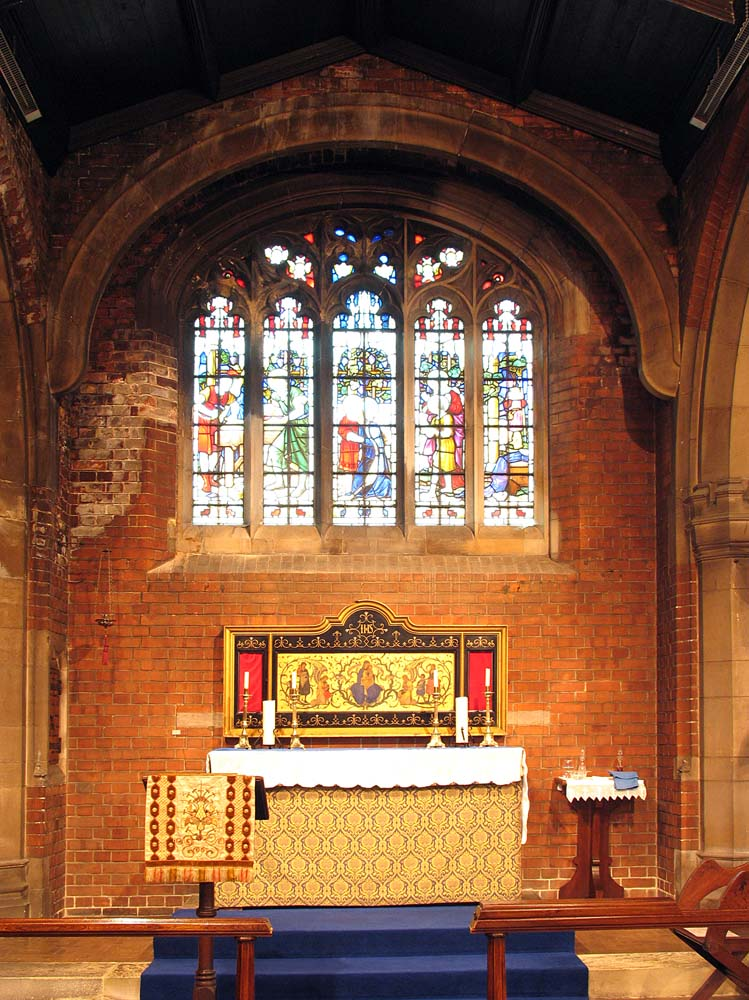
The sanctuary, high altar and east window

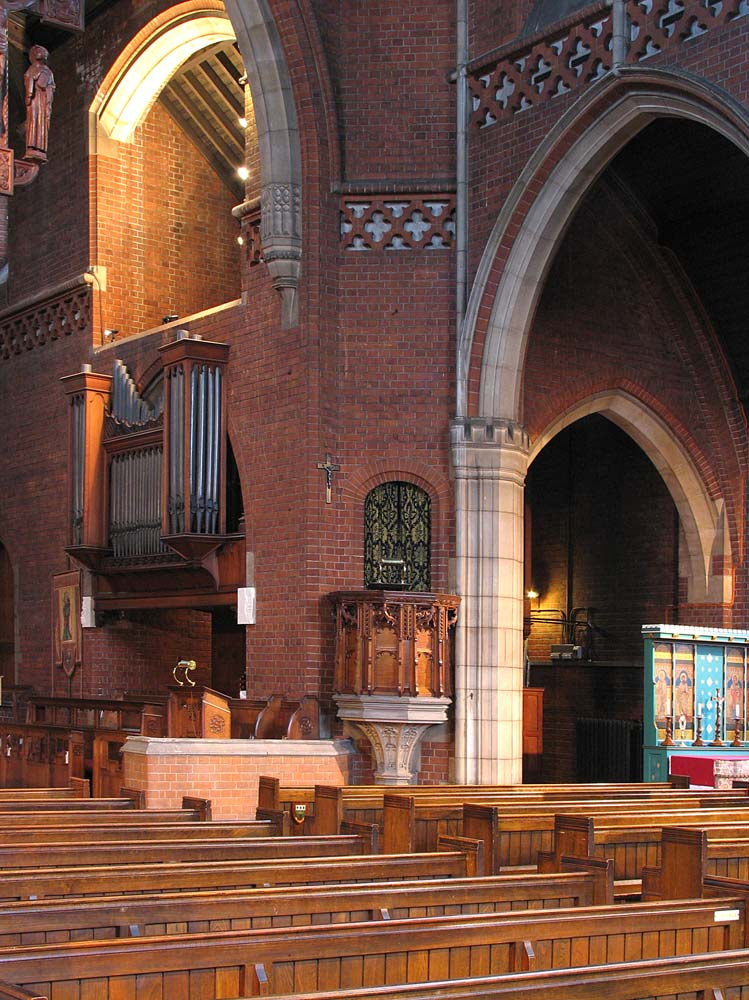
The pulpit and chancel arch

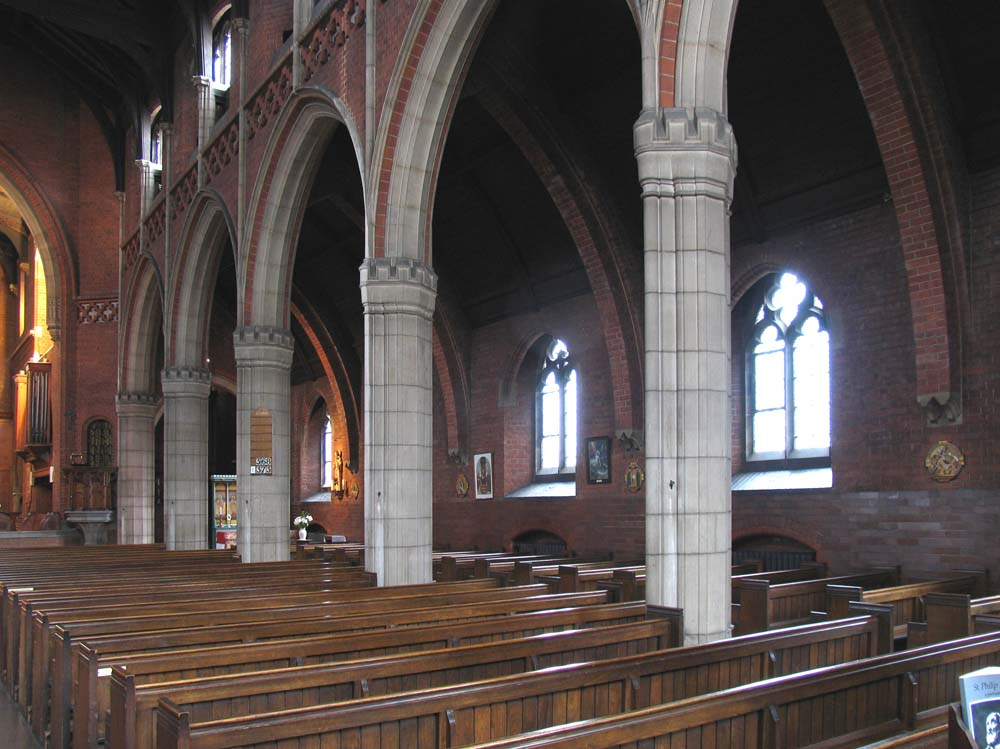
The south arcade and aisle

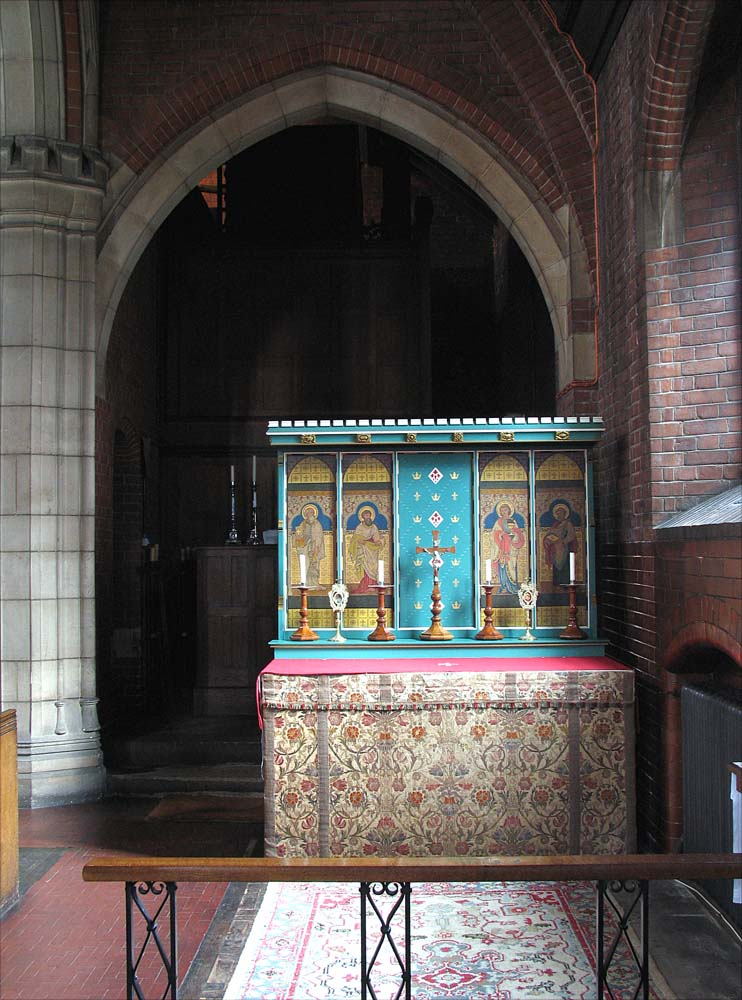
St James's Chapel
