= Lighthouse Methodist Church =

Church in London, England

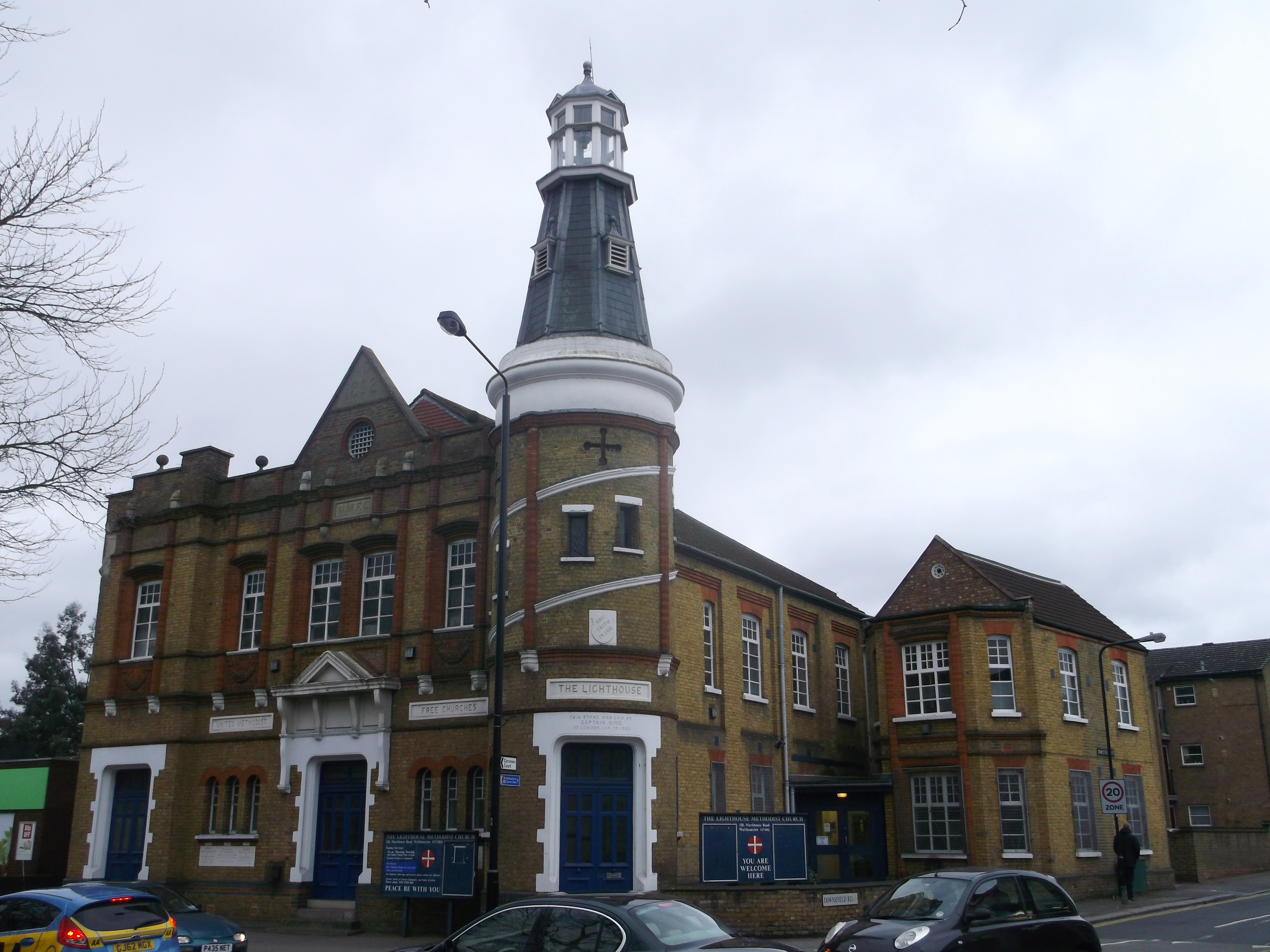
- Lighthouse Methodist Church in 2013

Religion
- Affiliation: Methodism
- Ecclesiastical or organizational status: active

Location
- Location: Markhouse Road, Walthamstow, London, England
- Interactive map of Lighthouse Methodist Church
- Coordinates: 51.576038°N 0.03015°W

Architecture
- Architect: J. Williams Dunford
- Type: Church
- Style: Queen Anne style architecture
- Completed: 1893

The Lighthouse Methodist Church is a Grade II listed church in Walthamstow, London.

== History ==
The church was completed in 1893 and designed by J. Williams Dunford. The building has a distinctive lighthouse.

== See also ==
- List of churches in London
- Grade II listed buildings in the London Borough of Waltham Forest
