= Richard Foerster =

Richard Foerster may refer to:

- Richard Foerster (classical scholar) (1843–1922), German scholar
- Richard Foerster (poet) (born 1949), American poet

== See also ==
- Richard Forster (disambiguation)
