= Richard Forster =

Richard Forster may refer to:

- Richard Forster (physician)
- Richard Forster (photographer)

== See also ==
- Richard Foerster (disambiguation)
- Richard Foster (disambiguation)
