= F. G. Southgate =

British architect

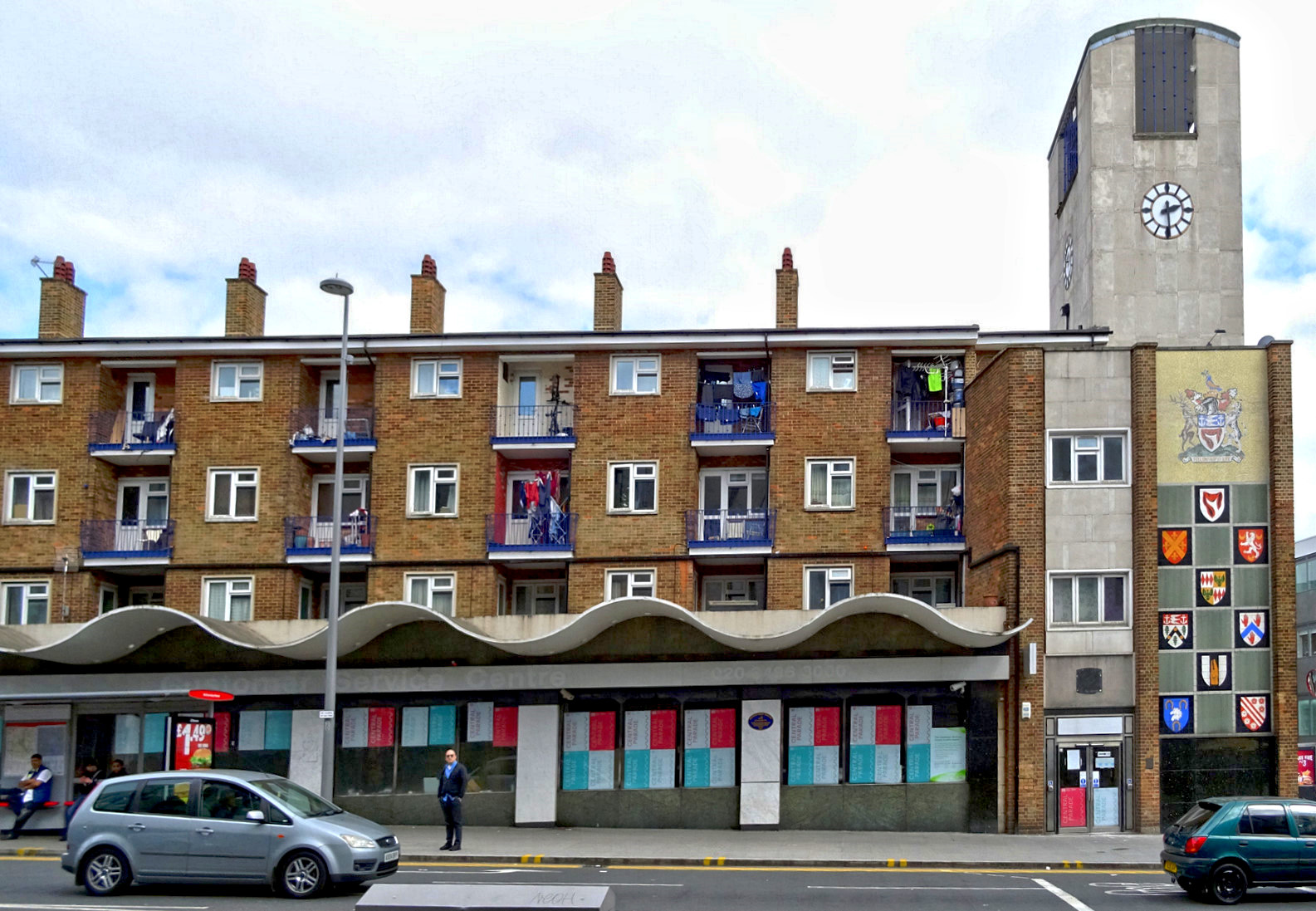
Central Parade, Walthamstow (1958)

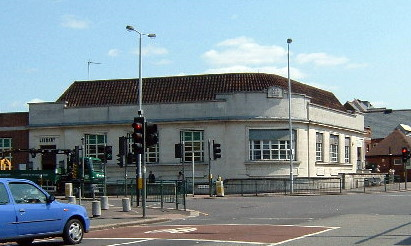
Wood Street Library (1950)

F. G. Southgate, ARIBA, was the borough architect, engineer and surveyor, for the Municipal Borough of Walthamstow, in Essex, England, (now part of the London Borough of Waltham Forest) in the post-Second World War period.

== Career ==
In 1942 he drew up a plan of the "main lines by which the town would develop after the war", for the Planning and Reconstruction Committee of Walthamstow borough.

Among his notable designs for the borough was the Countess Road development of 19 blocks of flats (1946), and Central Parade, Walthamstow, (1958) described by Historic England as embodying "the Festival style, blending pattern and colour, surface decoration, slender detailing and lively rhythmical modelling with conviction and élan".

== Selected works ==
- Countess Road development of 19 blocks of flats. (1946)
- Wood Street Library, Wood Street, E17. (1950)
- Central Parade, Walthamstow. (1958)
- Ellen Miller House, Tom Smith House, Ellis House. (completed 1963)
- Almshouse on Maynard Road, E17, for Walthamstow Almshouses and General Charities. (1972)
