= Walthamstow Village =

Coordinates: 51.58359°N 0.01234°W

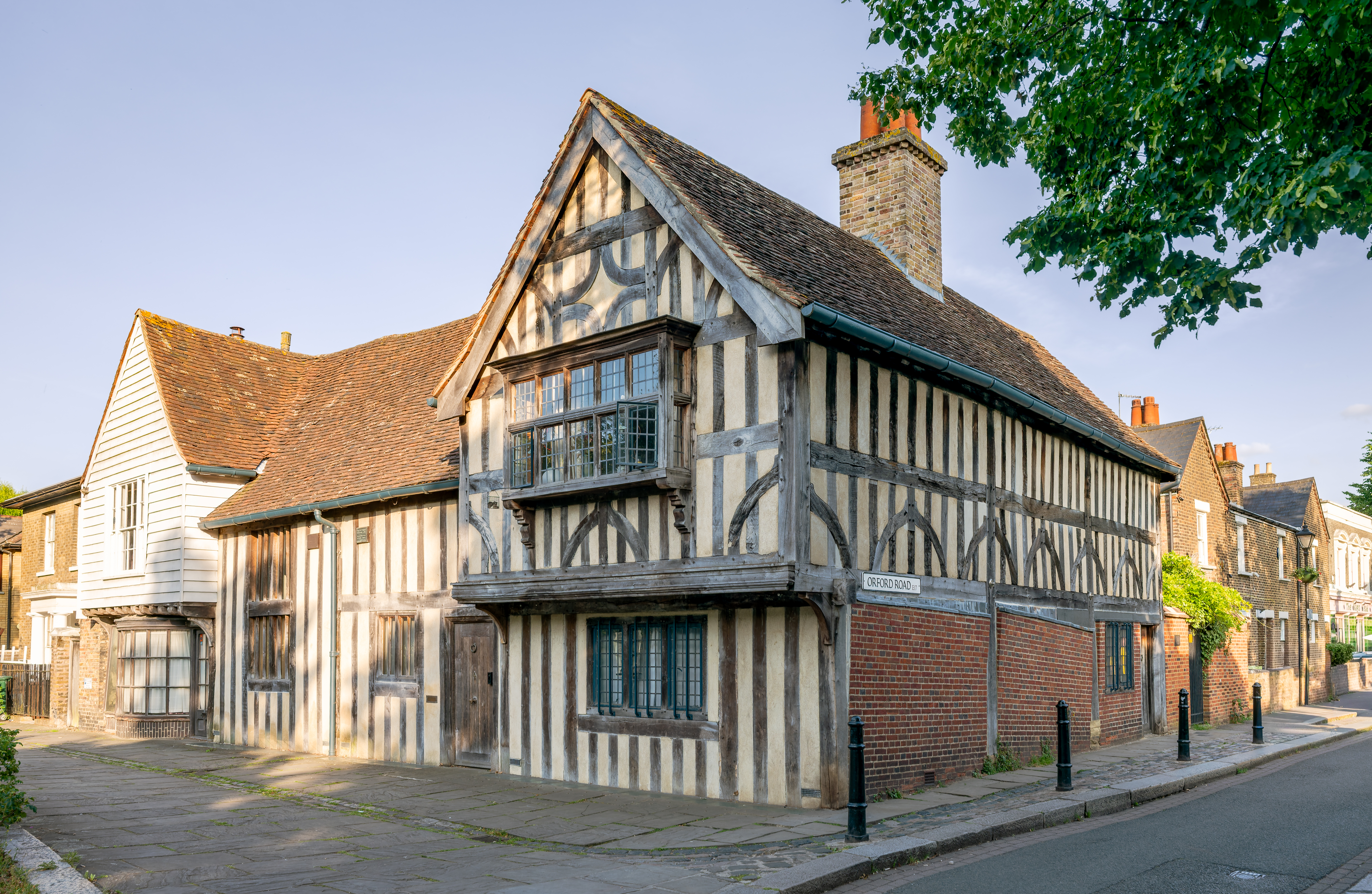
- The 15th-century building on Church Lane

- Location within Greater London
- OS grid reference: TQ385895
  - Charing Cross: 7.5 mi (12.1 km) SW
- London borough: Waltham Forest
- Ceremonial county: Greater London
- Region: London
- Country: England
- Sovereign state: United Kingdom
- Post town: LONDON
- Postcode district: E17
- Dialling code: 020
- Police: Metropolitan
- Fire: London
- Ambulance: London
- UK Parliament: Walthamstow
- London Assembly: North East

Walthamstow Village is the oldest part of Walthamstow, east London. It was designated a Conservation Area by the London Borough of Waltham Forest in 1967, and another Conservation Area on nearby Orford Road was subsequently added. The area centres on St. Mary's Church, which was founded in the 12th century. Across the road from this is a 15th-century timber-framed hall house called "The Ancient House", which was restored in 1934 and 2002. Nearby are almshouses dating from the 16th and 18th centuries, and the Vestry House Museum, which has been used as a workhouse and police station, but has been a museum since 1931. It also holds the archives of the borough and a local studies library.

Orford Road, the ancient road leading up to St Mary's church, has in recent years developed as a street of small restaurants, cafes and a local supermarket. There are also several pubs in the area.

== Transport and locale ==
=== Nearest stations ===
- Walthamstow Central station
- Wood Street railway station

=== Bus routes ===
- There is one bus route, the W12, which operates a hail-and-ride service in the area.

=== Places of interest ===
- Vestry House Museum
- The Ancient House
- St. Mary's Church, Walthamstow
- Orford House
