= Our Lady of Grace and St Teresa of Avila =

Roman Catholic church in Chingford, London, England

Coordinates: 51.630232°N 0.001607°E

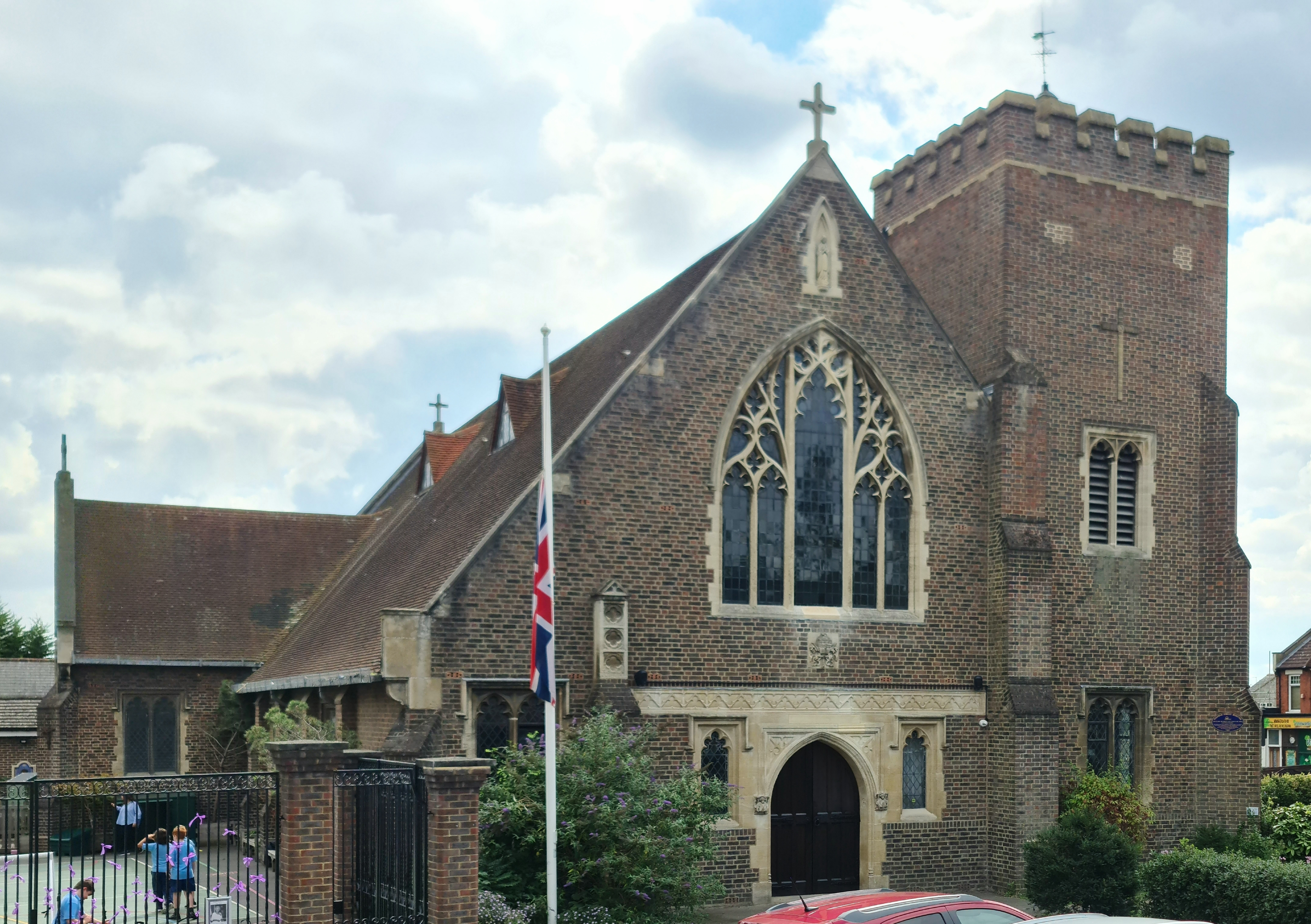
Exterior

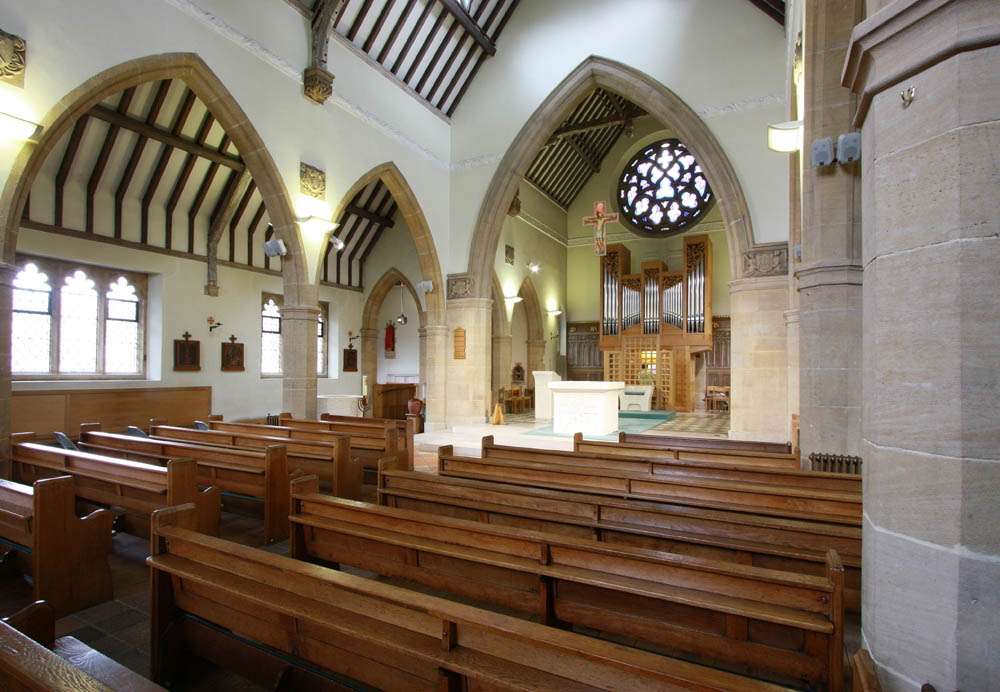
Interior

Our Lady of Grace and St Teresa of Avila is a Grade II listed Roman Catholic church at 1 King's Road, Chingford, London, E4 7HP.

It was built in 1930 by the architect George W. Martyn with extensions in 1939 and 1956.
