= Central Parade, Walthamstow =

Shopping parade in Walthamstow, London

Coordinates: 51°35′07″N 0°01′09″W

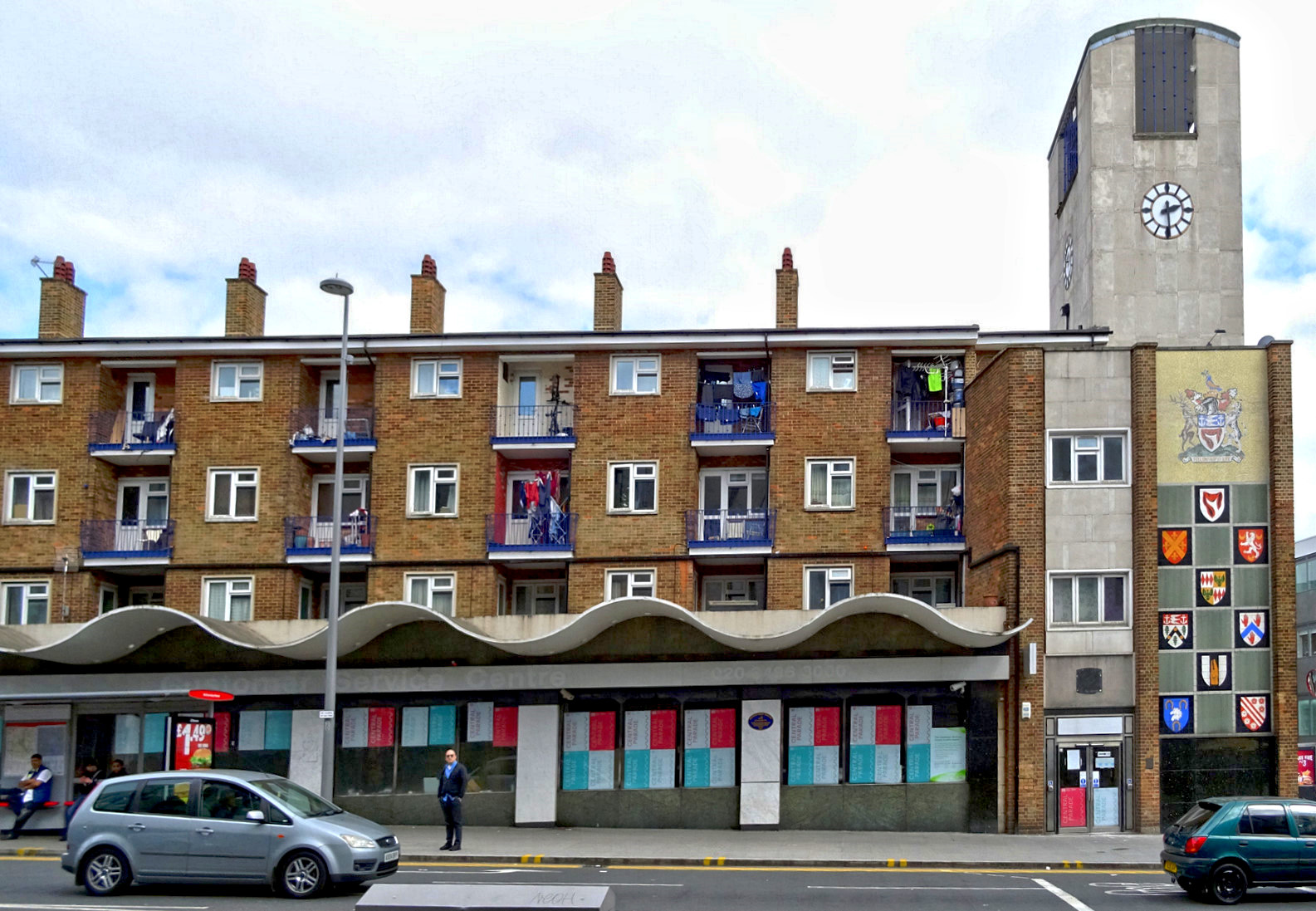
Central Parade

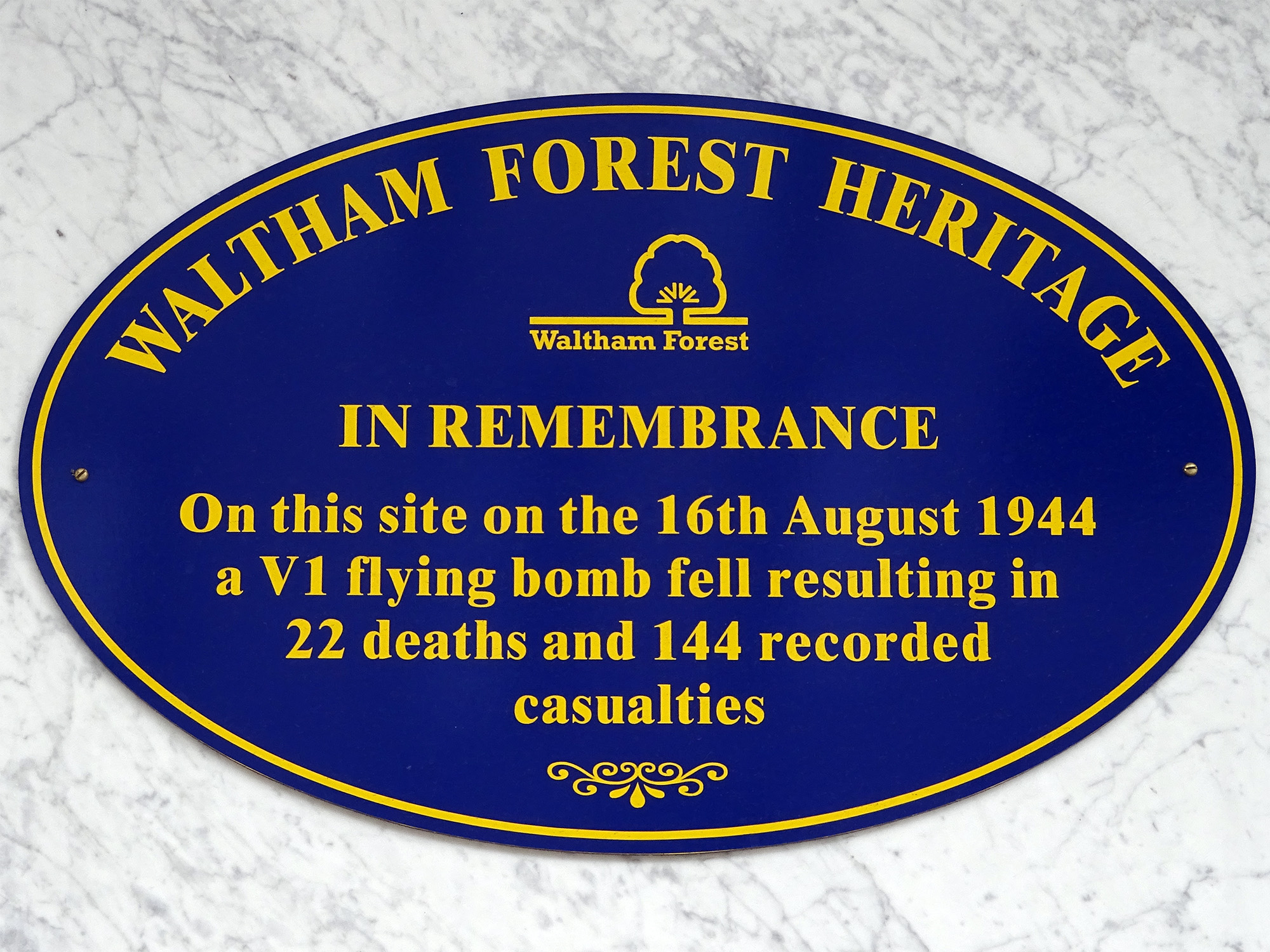
Plaque marking the V1 attack in 1944.

Central Parade, on the corner of Hoe Street and Church Hill, Walthamstow, is a shopping parade with offices and flats above that is Grade II listed by Historic England. It was designed in 1954 by F. G. Southgate, the borough surveyor, and built in 1957–58. Historic England says that it "embodies the Festival [of Britain] style, blending pattern and colour, surface decoration, slender detailing and lively rhythmical modelling with conviction and élan".

The building is on the site of a Second World War V1 flying bomb attack in 1944, which resulted in 22 deaths and 144 recorded casualties. Besides the line of shops and offices, it includes Walthamstow's clock tower.
