= Leytonstone Library =

Public library in London, England

Coordinates: 51°34′05″N 0°00′38″E

Leystonstone Library
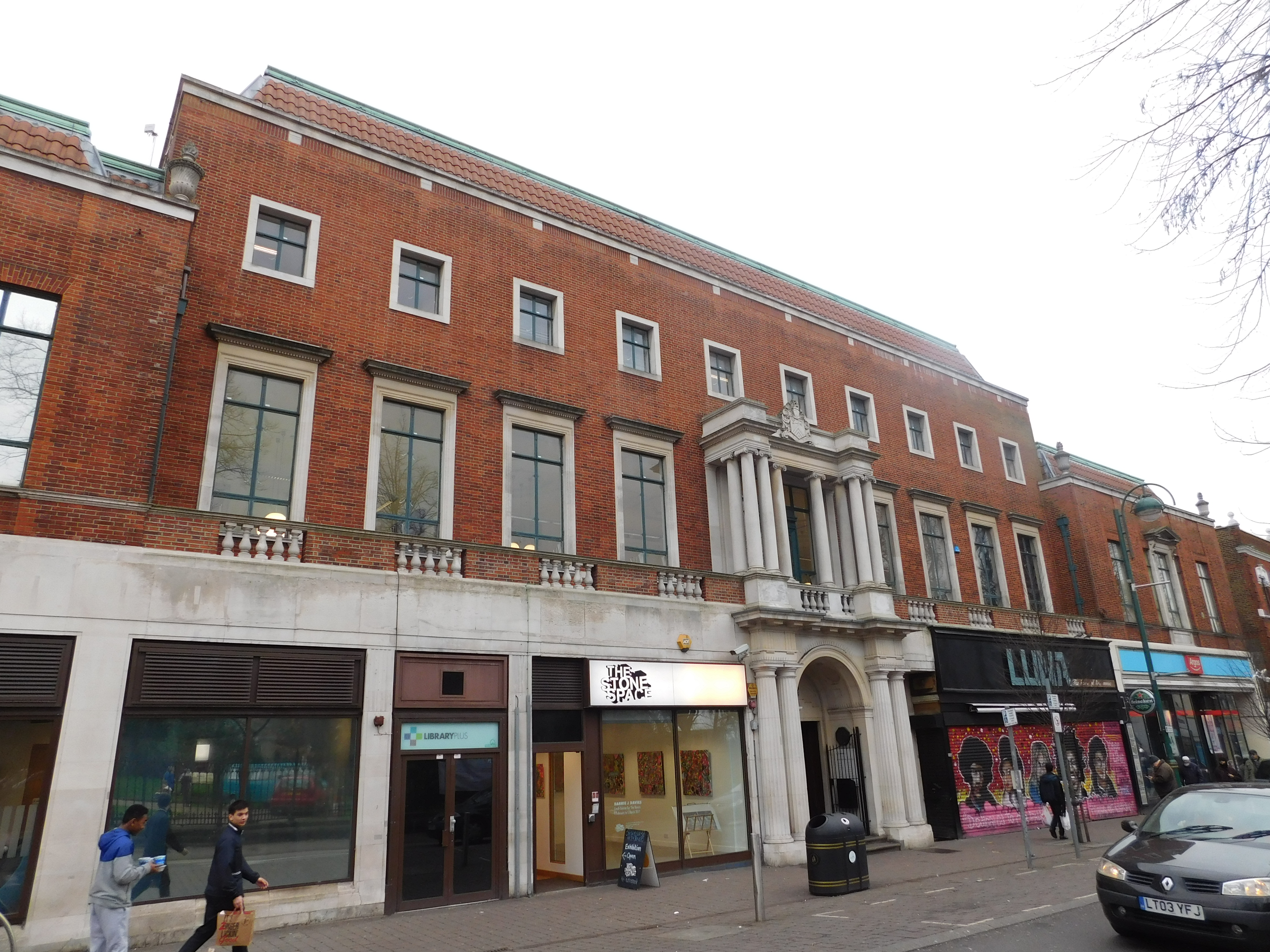
- Leytonstone Library, viewed from Church Lane
- Location: Leytonstone, Waltham Forest, England
- Type: Public Library
- Established: 1934; 91 years ago
- Architect: James Ambrose Dartnall

Collection
- Items collected: 19,000 books

Other information
- Parent organization: Waltham Forest Libraries
- Website: walthamforest.gov.uk/content/leytonstone-library-plus

Leytonstone Library is a public library in Leytonstone, London and a grade II* listed building. The library was built in 1934 for Leyton Urban District Council, and is now managed by the London Borough of Waltham Forest.

The building's ground floor is let out to retail units with the library on the floor above, which allowed for the construction of a much larger building than would have otherwise been possible. This makes Leytonstone Library an early example of a library being constructed as part of multi-function buildings with both municipal and commercial services, according to Historic England who describe it as "a suburban branch library of considerable architectural ambition ".

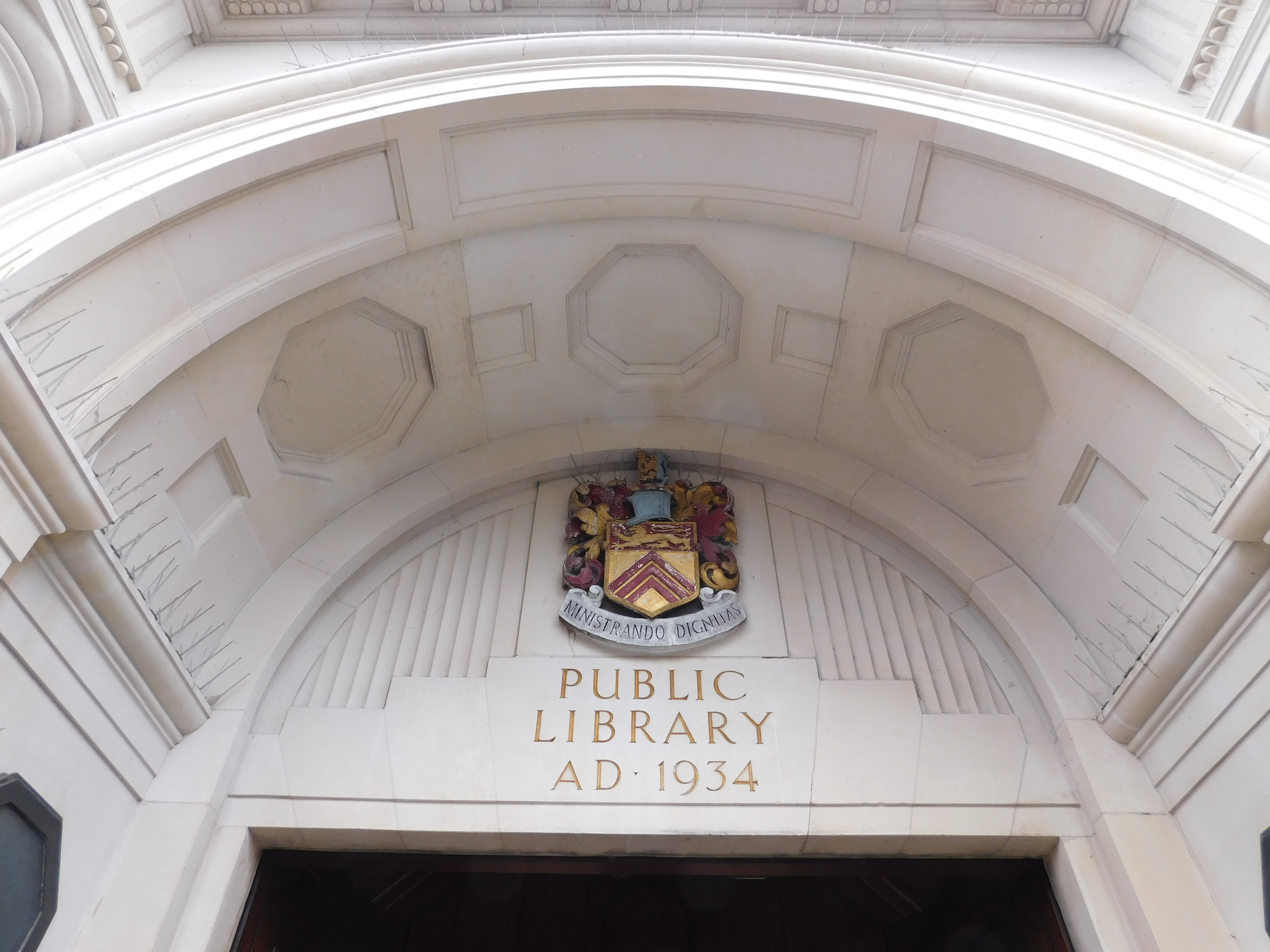
Crest above library entrance

The front of the building and its entrance lobby, however, was still built in a grand art deco style under the instruction of librarian of the borough, Edward Sydney, with the intention that it should "reflect the pride of the local authority in its library service".

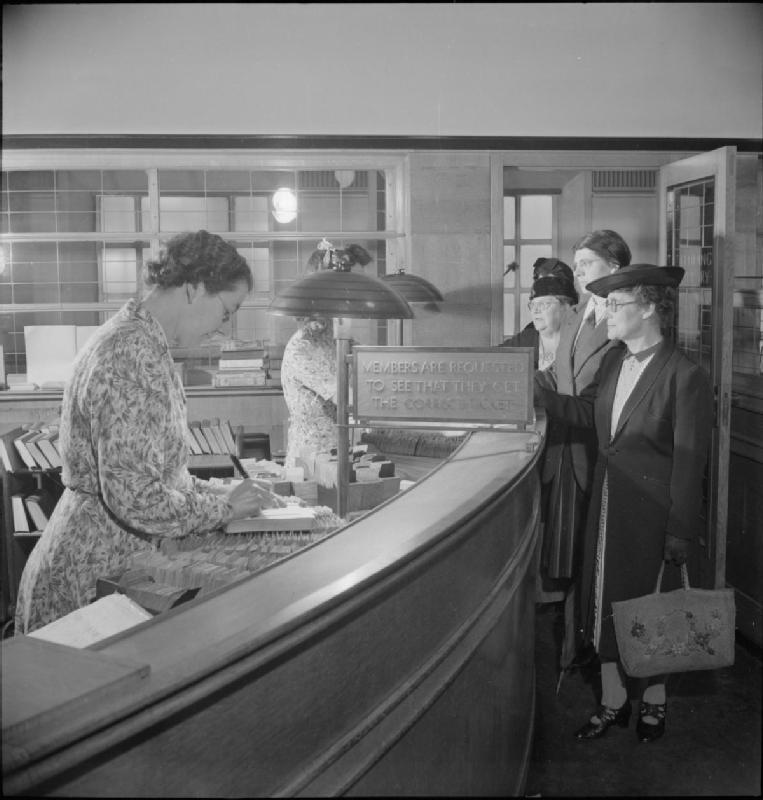
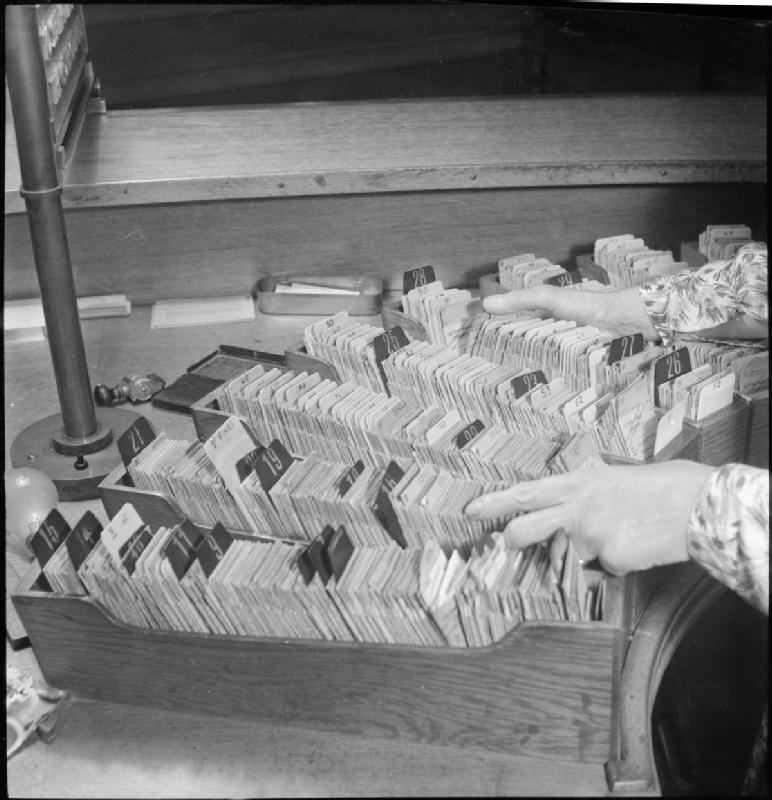
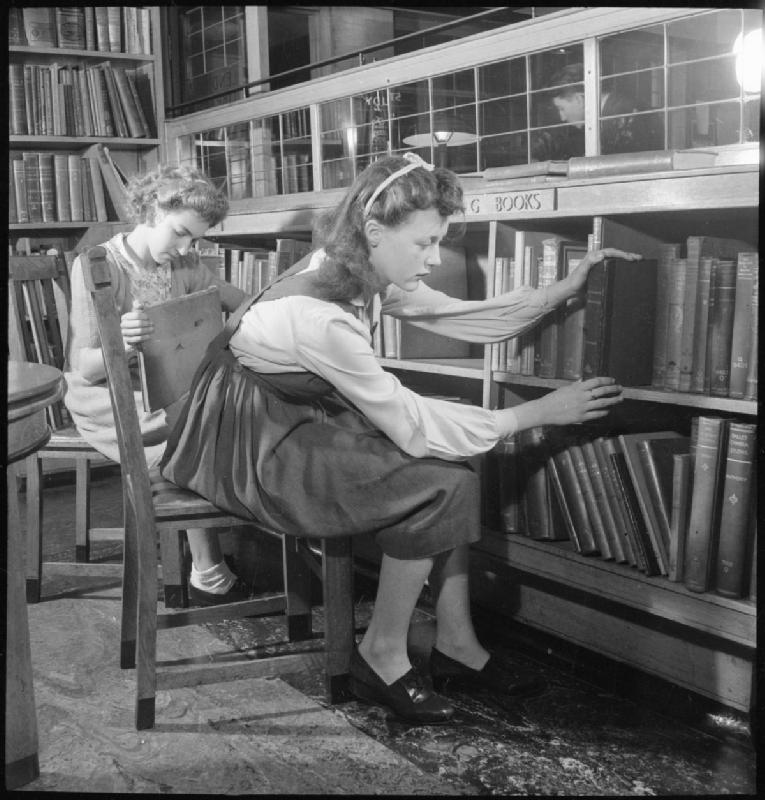
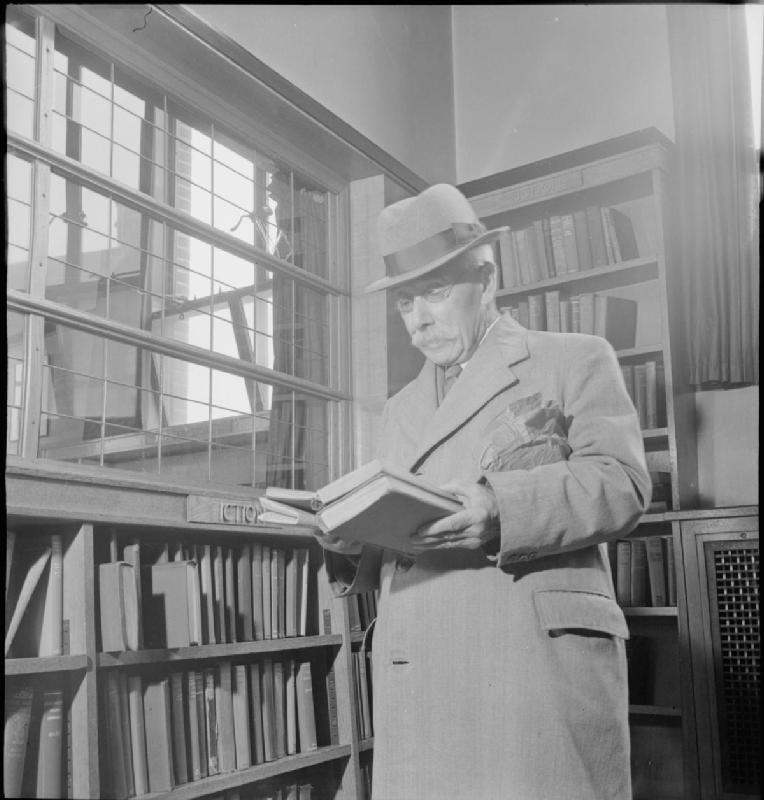
Photographs of Leystonstone Library commissioned by the Ministry of Information, now archived by the Imperial War Museum.

During the Second World War, The British Ministry of Information commissioned a series of photographs of the library's interior showing patrons freely browsing the catalogues for use in war propaganda to show a stark contrast with Nazi book-burning, making the library a symbol of freedom and democracy.

Following a £1.5 million investment from Waltham Forest Borough Council and an 11-month closure ending in September 2015, the library's facilities now include a theatre hall, upgraded ICT facilities and faster wi-fi, and dedicated sections for adults, teens and children.

Designations

Listed Building – Grade II*
- Designated: 28 April 2014
- Reference no.: 1418380
