= Chingford War Memorial =

War memorial in London

Coordinates: 51.631523°N 0.001298°W

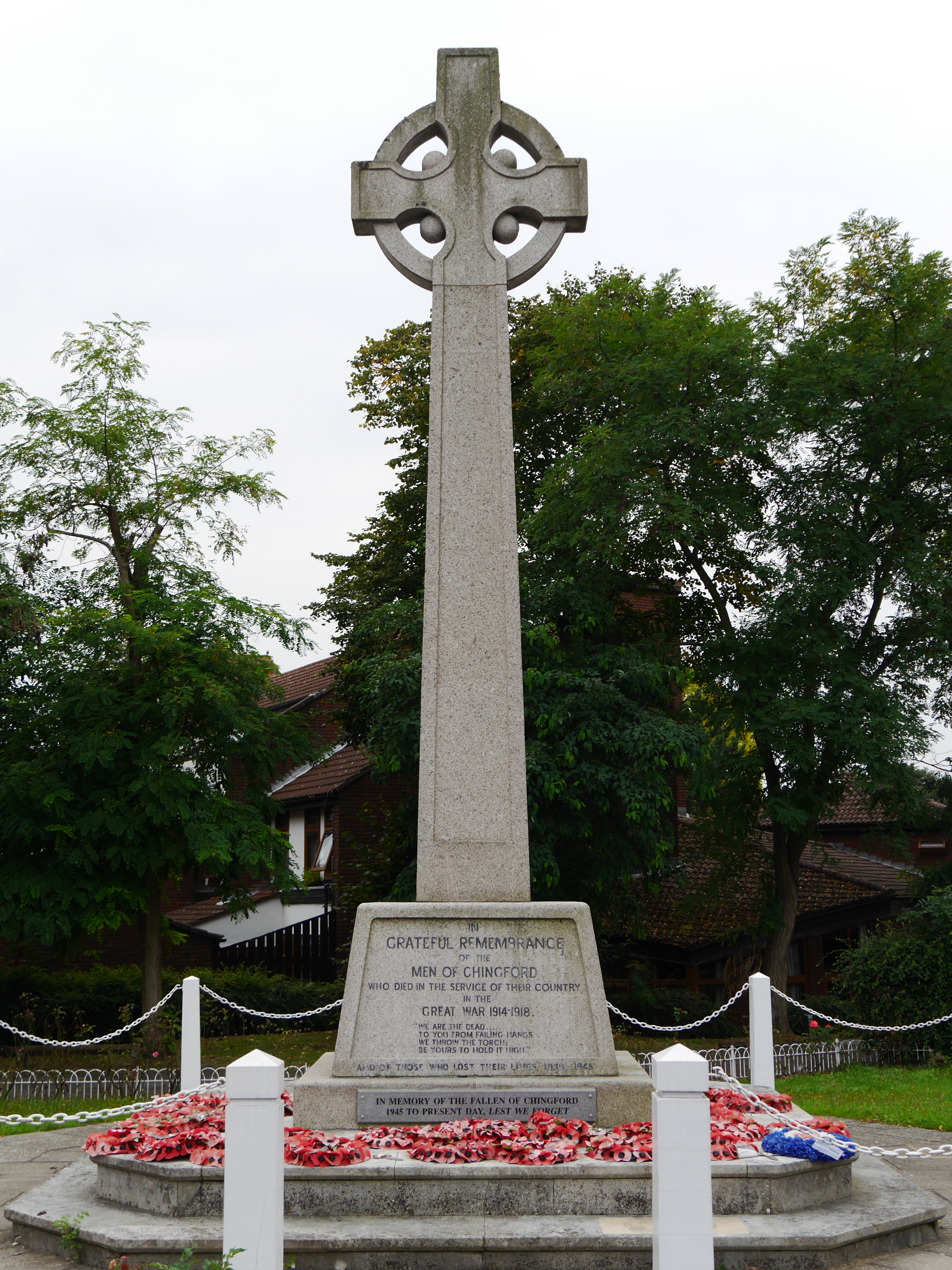
Chingford War Memorial

Chingford War Memorial is a Grade II listed war memorial cross at the junction of King's Head Hill and The Ridgeway, Chingford, London, E4.

It was unveiled in 1921, and was designed by W. A. Lewis.

== See also ==
- List of public art in Waltham Forest
