= St Mary's Church, Walthamstow =

Coordinates: 51°35′2″N 0°0′40″W

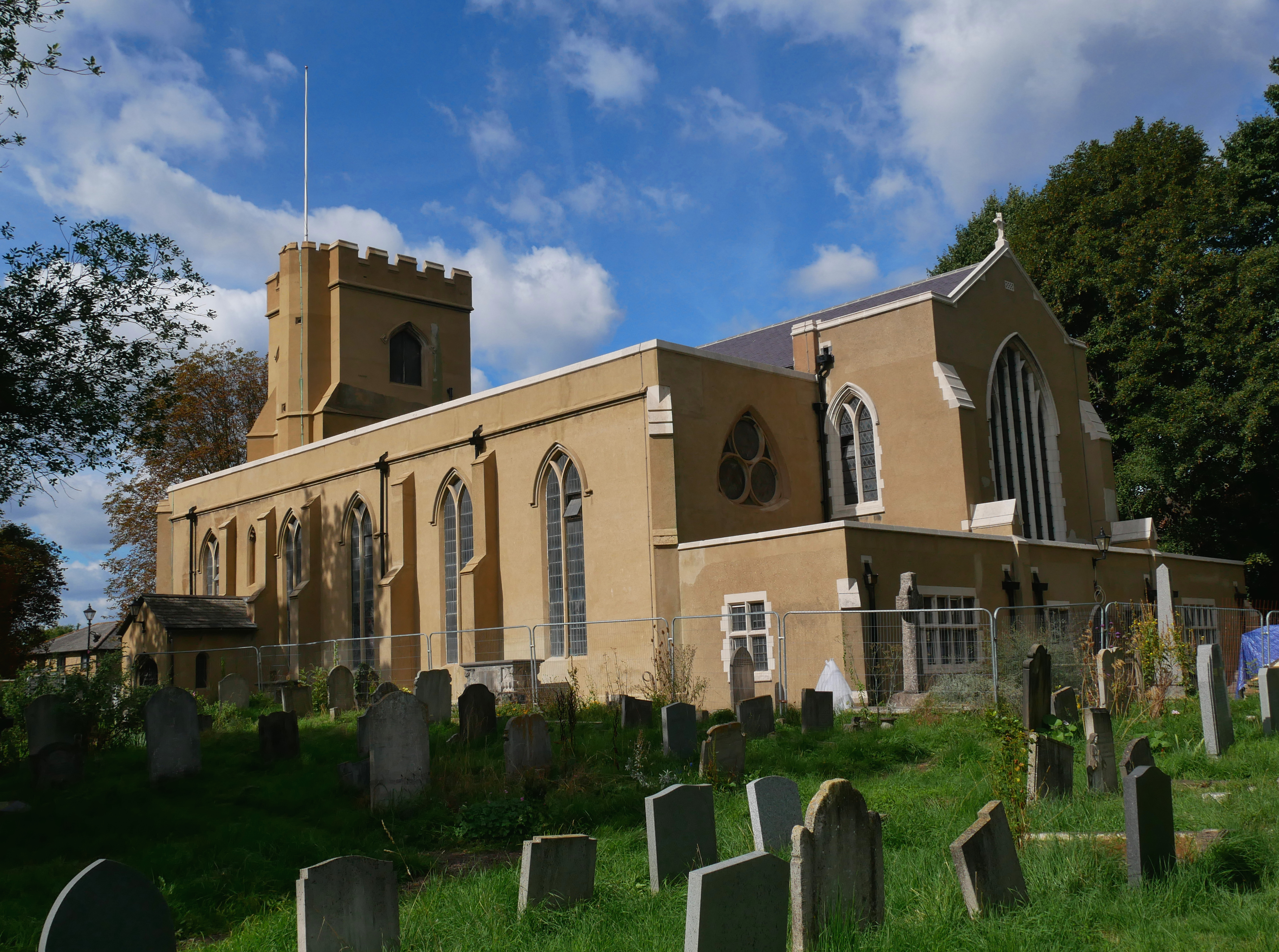
- View of St. Mary's Church from the southeast
- St Mary's Church, Walthamstow
- Location: Walthamstow Village, London
- Country: England
- Denomination: Church of England
- Website: stmaryswalthamstow.org

History
- Status: Active

Architecture
- Functional status: Parish church
- Heritage designation: Grade II* listed
- Designated: 19 October 1951

Administration
- Diocese: Chelmsford
- Archdeaconry: West Ham

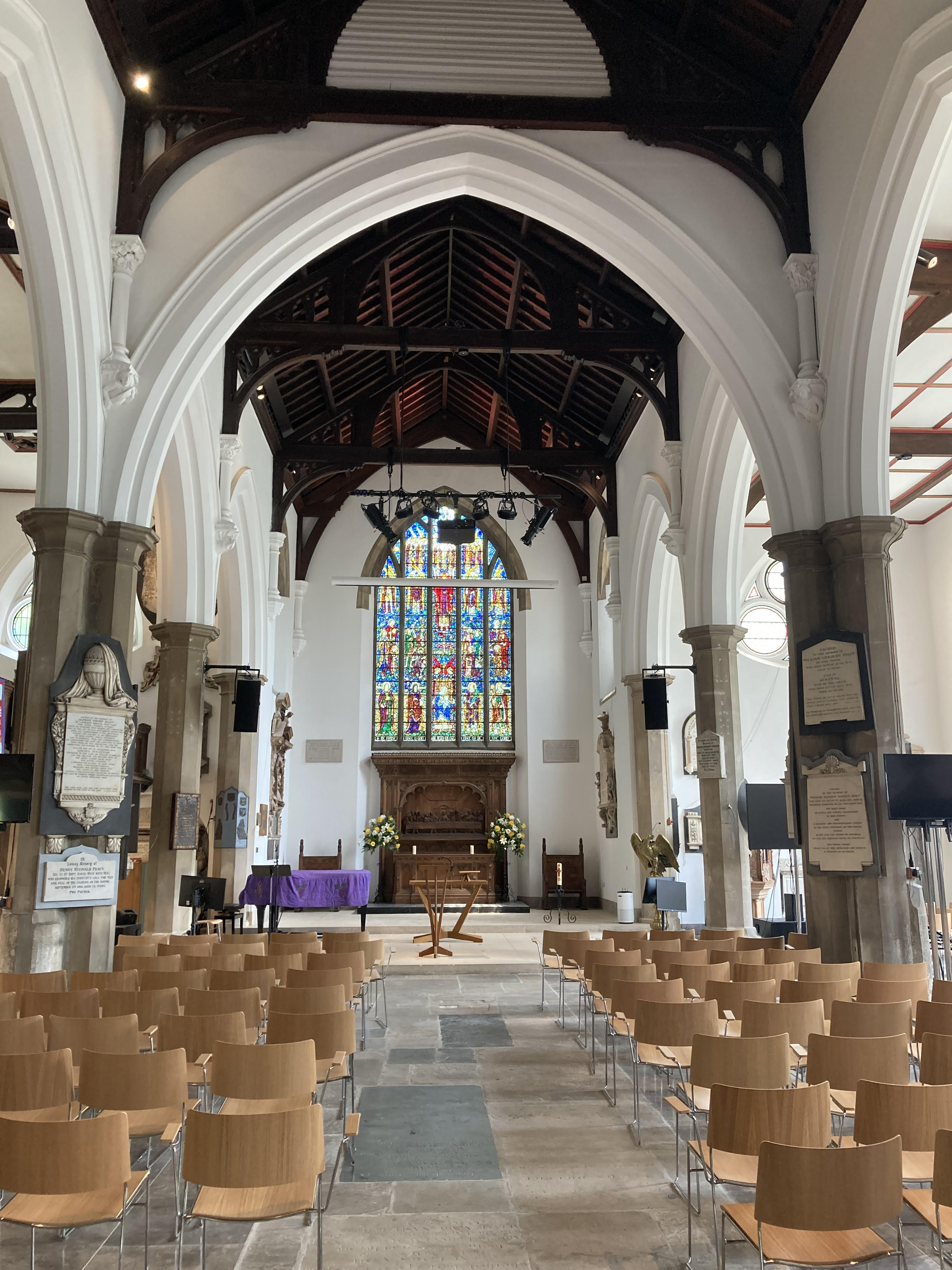
Internal view of St Mary's after completion of its regeneration project

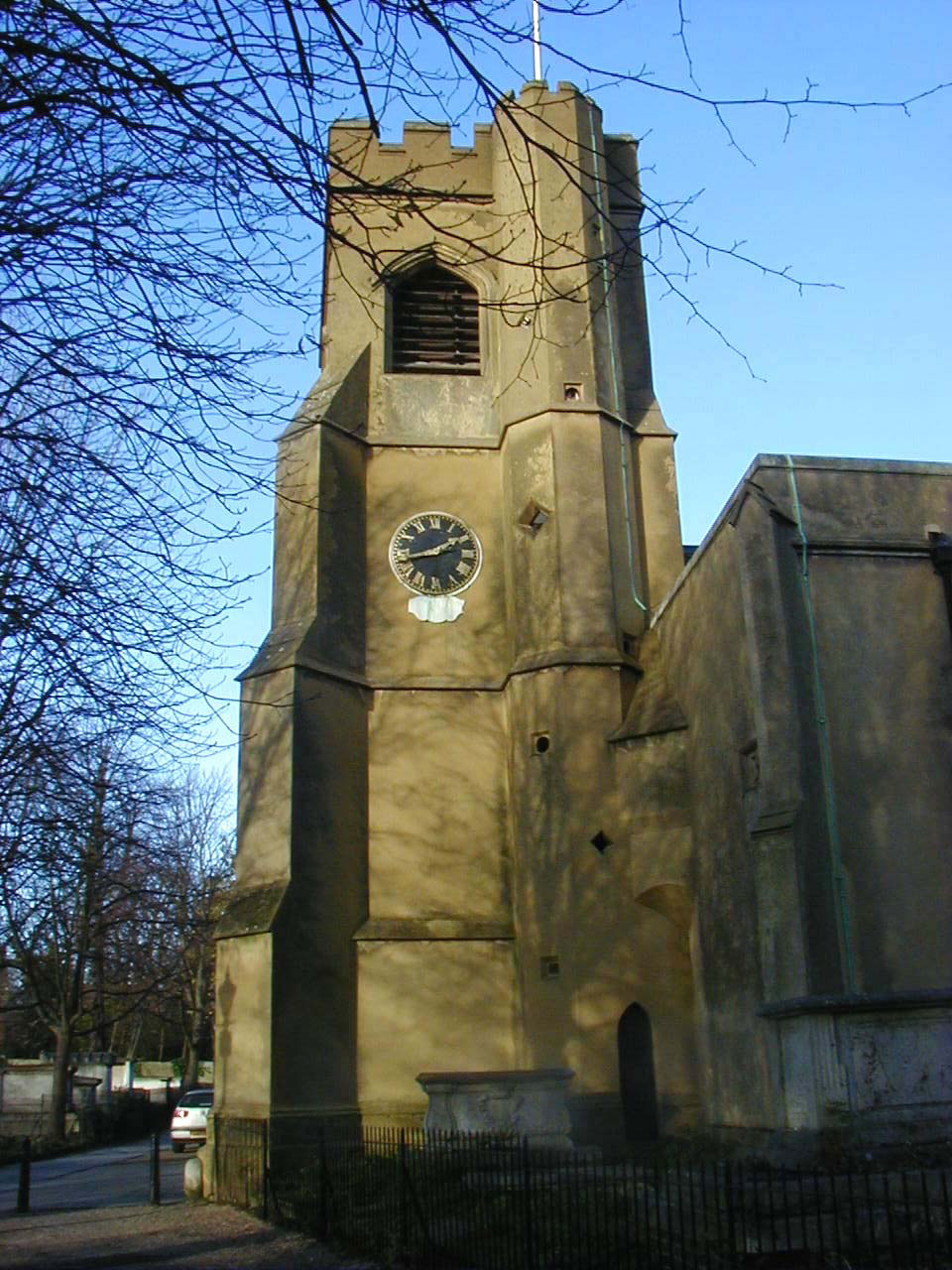
The tower of the church dates mostly from the 15th century. The top floor and the turret were added in their present form by Sir George Monoux in the 16th century.

St Mary's Church, Walthamstow, is a Church of England parish church in Walthamstow Village, a conservation area in Walthamstow, east London. It was founded in the 12th century. It retains over one hundred and fifty brasses and monuments, the oldest dating from 1436, though all that now remains of the original Norman church is some pillar bases and the chisel marks on them.

St Mary's is an active church today, with a large congregation involved in supporting the local community. In recent years, the church has improved the facilities that support its community support work. There have also been projects to maintain the ancient fabric of the church building. This has included renovation of the church's ten bells, most of which were cast at the nearby Whitechapel Bell Foundry. The work on the bells, which are regularly rung, will allow them to peal for at least another hundred years.

== History ==
The first church building on the site was constructed in the 12th century, and measured about 15 metres by 8 metres (46 feet by 24 feet) with a sanctuary or chancel of unknown size at the east end. It was probably built of flint rubble and stood where the present nave now stands.

It is believed that the north aisle of the church was rebuilt in the 13th century and the south aisle in the 14th century, both extending east only as far as the current chancel arch. In the 15th century, a tower was added at the west end, and the chancel was also extended eastward.

In 1535, Sir George Monoux, Alderman of London and Master of the Worshipful Company of Drapers, one of the guilds of the City of London, repaired the north aisle and built a chapel on the east end of it running along the north wall of the chancel. At the same time, Monoux demolished the top 40 feet (12 m) of the tower and rebuilt it in Tudor brick, adding a spiral stairway in a turret at the south-east corner of the tower. In the same year, money from Robert Thorne (a wealthy London merchant who, like Monoux, originated from Bristol and became Lord Mayor of the City of London) was used to completely rebuild the south aisle and to add a chapel on its eastern end.

Internal galleries to provide extra seating for the congregation were added in the 18th century, the first being constructed at the west end of the church in 1710, with further galleries being built in the north and south aisles during the course of the century. In 1819, the aisle galleries were linked with the western one, and the walls of the nave at the west end were increased in height. At the same time, the old windows of the nave were bricked up and the present Gothic Revival ones cut. In 1843, the rest of the walls of the church were increased in height to match that of the west end, and the pillars of the nave were heightened and remodelled to their present shape, leaving only the column bases as the final remnant of the 12th-century church above ground level. A rose window was also inserted in the east wall of the chancel. The new parish of St Peter's was split off from the parish in 1845.

In 1876, the galleries were 'thrown back' from the nave pillars (i.e., reduced in width by one half), an older plaster ceiling was removed, and a roof of stained wood was installed. The private box pews which had accrued in the nave since the Reformation were also removed and replaced by open benches which were, in turn, superseded by the current pews in the 1920s, together with oak panelling to the rear and sides of the church and in the galleries as a First World War memorial. Choir stalls of carved oak were given to the church by Sir William Mallinson in 1939 in memory of his father.

In 1936 the east wall was found to be suffering from structural failure and, during the course of repairs, the opportunity was taken to rebuild that part of the church and extend the chancel 3 metres (12 feet) east and to build vestries on either side. In 1939, a large window in perpendicular gothic style was added to the east end of the church.

St Mary's suffered serious damage during Second World War. On 4 October 1940, the south aisle roof was destroyed by incendiary bomb and the gallery on that side was subsequently demolished to provide timber for repairing the church. On 8 October 1944, a bomb damaged the north side of the church tower. It was reported that a bomb disposal officer who investigated the scene in the dark could "feel the shape of a bomb and the jagged edge of its fins." The churchyard was closed for two Sundays pending investigations. It transpired that the "bomb" was an old lead coffin, broken open by debris falling from the tower.

During the spring of 1942, all the railings surrounding the churchyard and most of those around the monuments were removed to provide scrap iron to help the war effort. All that remained were the north and south gates.

Post-war restoration of the church included a new heating system (with a boiler house built outside the north porch) and the rebuilding of the organ. The railings outside were replaced in 1955. In the early 1960s, the east end of the south aisle was remodelled to create a side chapel.

== Modern refurbishment and community facilities ==
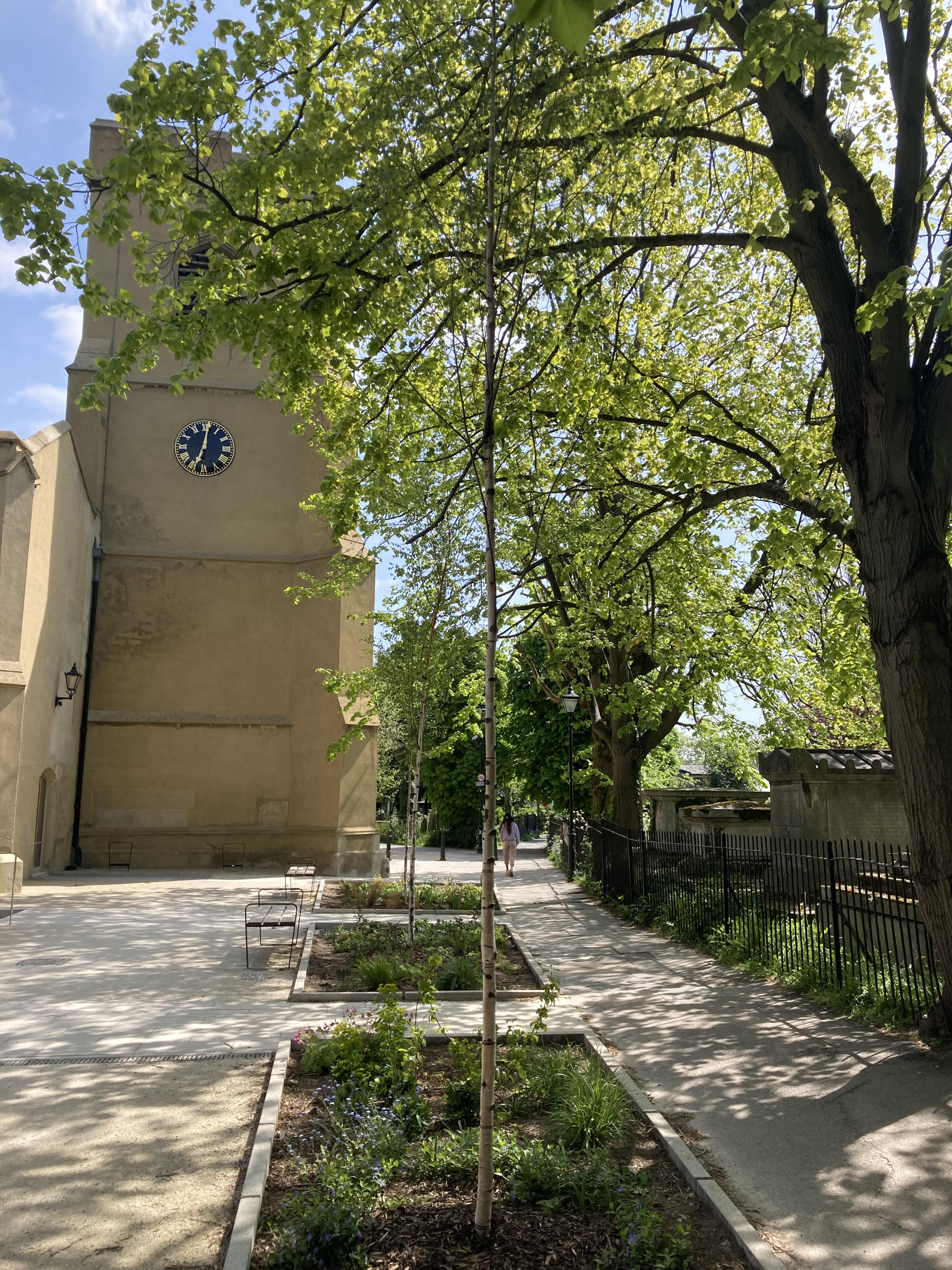
As part of the regeneration project, St Mary's church car park was transformed into a landscaped public space, which is now managed by the church.

Between 1995 and 2001, extensive refurbishment of the church took place, which included removing three rows of pews from the west end of the nave, reflooring, and creating a larger entrance area adjacent to the west door. When the floor was removed, some of the crypt underneath the church were rediscovered. During the same work, when the ceiling from the entrance lobby underneath the bell tower was removed, it revealed several large oak beams, probably used during the reconstruction of the tower in the 16th century. It was decided that these beams would be refurbished and left permanently exposed; the 18th-century beams of the south porch roof were similarly restored and left exposed. At the same period, a disabled toilet and refreshment area were installed and the sanctuary was reordered.

In 2001, the floor of the chancel was lowered and extended into the nave to provide an open space for worship. Two of the choir stalls were retained in the sanctuary, and the rest relocated to the west end of the gallery. Communion can now be celebrated at the front of the nave and served on three sides.

The church has a ring of ten bells, seven of which were cast at the Whitechapel Bell Foundry, with the three newest bells cast in 1896 by John Warner & Sons. In 2016, a major project was launched to restore the ten bells so that they are able to be rung for at least another 100 years. The last major work that was done on the bells was in 1896 when 3 new bells were added. In Feb 2016, new hatches were cut into the ceiling of the ringing room and clock chamber (between ringing room and bells) and this allowed the bells and their fittings to be removed and taken to John Taylor's Bell Foundry in Loughborough for specialist work, including cleaning and re-tuning. New fittings were made for the bells and they returned in Sept 2016. When the bells returned, they were hoisted up the tower and into the bell chamber, where they were re-hung in their 1896 cast iron frame which had been re-painted. New sound control shutters were fitted behind the louvres in the bell chamber, so that they can be shut when the bells are being rung for long periods of time, usually called a 'peal' and lasting for roughly 3 hours. The bells are rung regularly.

In 2019, St Mary's announced it had secured a nearly £1.5 million National Lottery Fund Heritage grant to restore and renovate the church building as part of its Creative Church project. The works began in 2021 and cost approximately £3.37 million in total. The regeneration project repaired and renovated the ancient building to make it more suitable for community arts and cultural activities, alongside securing its future as a working parish church. The project removed the pews to create more flexible seating, built an extension to create a new entrance and gallery\exhibition space, created a café with an outdoor serving window, upgraded the sound system and lighting, added additional toilets and a play area, created heritage displays and renovated the church's two back vestries among other improvements. Free community arts and heritage activities were also part of the project. St Mary's also hires rooms and spaces in both the church and nearby St Mary's Welcome Centre to outside groups.

The church hosts regular exhibitions, performances and other community events, and has a café run by local partners Ruttle & Rowe with both indoor and outdoor seating as well as a play area for young children. The church is a founding member of Waltham Forest Citizens, the local Citizens UK alliance and a member of the Inclusive Church network.

St Mary's is also well known for its green publicly accessible churchyard, which is the largest green space in Walthamstow Village and won 'Churchyard of the Year' in the 2023 London in Bloom gardening competition.

In 2025, Matthew Lloyd Architects won a prestigious RIBA London award for St Mary's regeneration project.

== Churchyard ==
The churchyard contains war graves of three service personnel of World War I and nine of World War II.

The churchyard is home to the 'Burials in Bloom' project, where local residents 'adopt' a grave that is not currently visited. Dozens of residents have participated in the community gardening scheme, which is run by head gardener Tim Hewitt. In 2021, St Mary's Churchyard won London in Bloom's 'Silver Gilt' award for the churchyard category. The churchyard has since won 'Churchyard of the Year' multiple times.

In 2025, St Mary's Churchyard was featured on ITV's Alan Titchmarsh's Gardening Club.
