= Butler's Retreat =

Coordinates: 51.634466°N 0.018484061°E

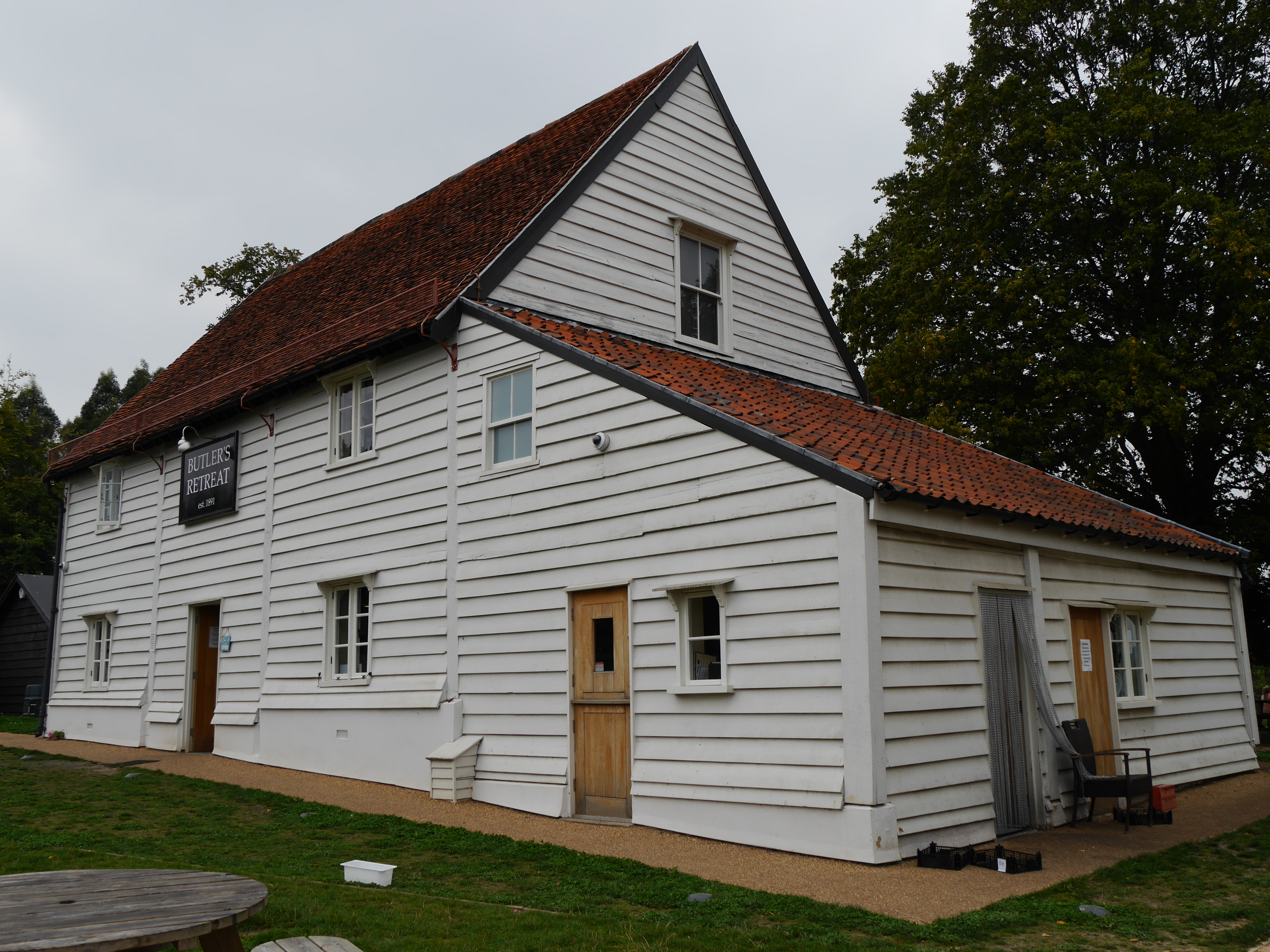
Butler's Retreat

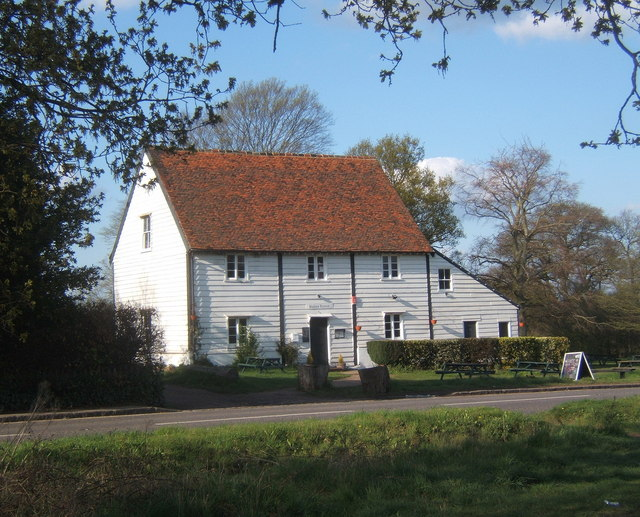
Butler's Retreat, a restaurant near the hunting lodge.jpg

Butler's Retreat is a Grade II listed building at Rangers Road, Chingford, London E4. Originally a barn thought to have been built in the early 19th century, it is one of the few remaining Victorian retreats within the forest. The building is very close to Queen Elizabeth's Hunting Lodge and takes its name from its 1891 occupier, John Butler.

Retreats originally served non-alcoholic refreshments as part of the Temperance movement. After closing in 2009, the building was refurbished by the City of London Corporation and re-opened as a cafe in 2012.
