= Bull and Crown, Chingford =

Former pub in Chingford, London

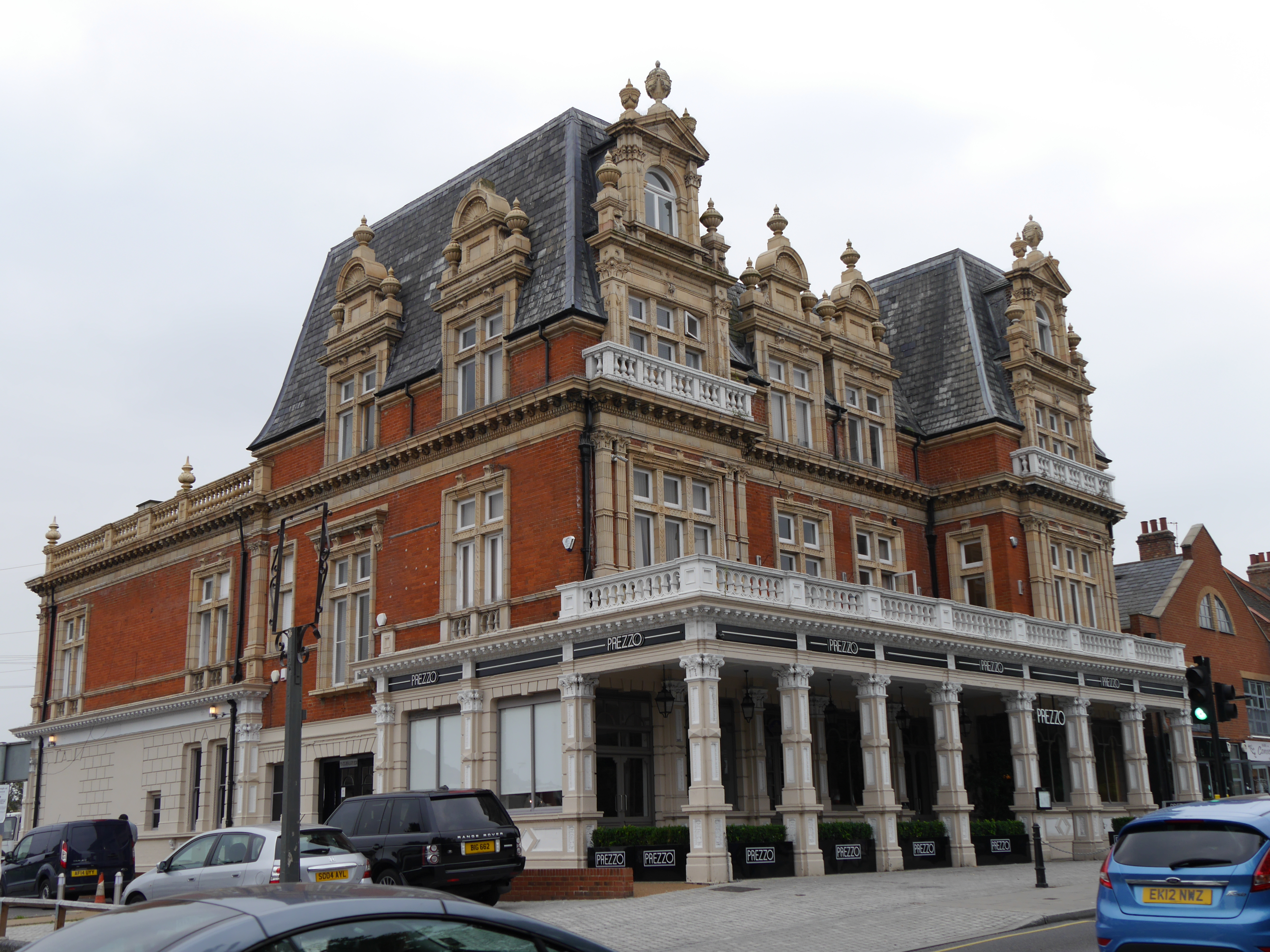
- The Bull and Crown (now Prezzo), 2014

- Location within London Borough of Waltham Forest Location within Greater London

General information
- Location: The Green, Chingford, London, England
- Coordinates: 51.630238°N 0.000755°E
- Completed: 1898

Design and construction
- Designations

Listed Building – Grade II
- Official name: Bull and Crown
- Designated: 24 February 1987
- Reference no.: 1065584

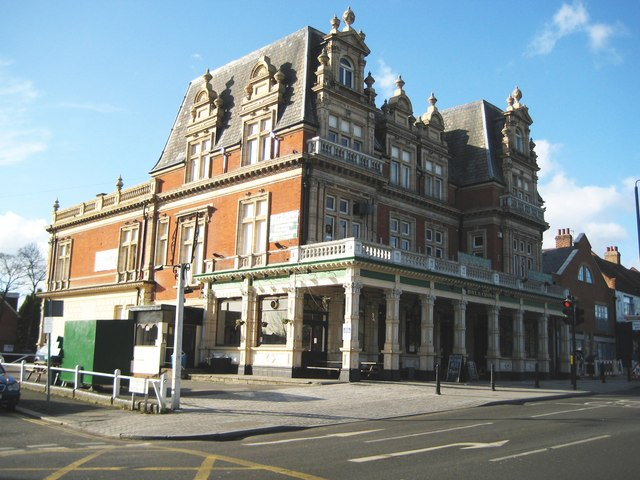
The Bull and Crown, 2008

The Bull and Crown is a Grade II listed former public house, now restaurant, at The Green, Chingford, London E4.

It was built in 1898.

In December 2012, after a £500,000 redevelopment, it re-opened as a branch of the Prezzo restaurant chain.
