= Carbis Cottage =

Historic house in London, England

Coordinates: 51.631635°N 0.002146°E

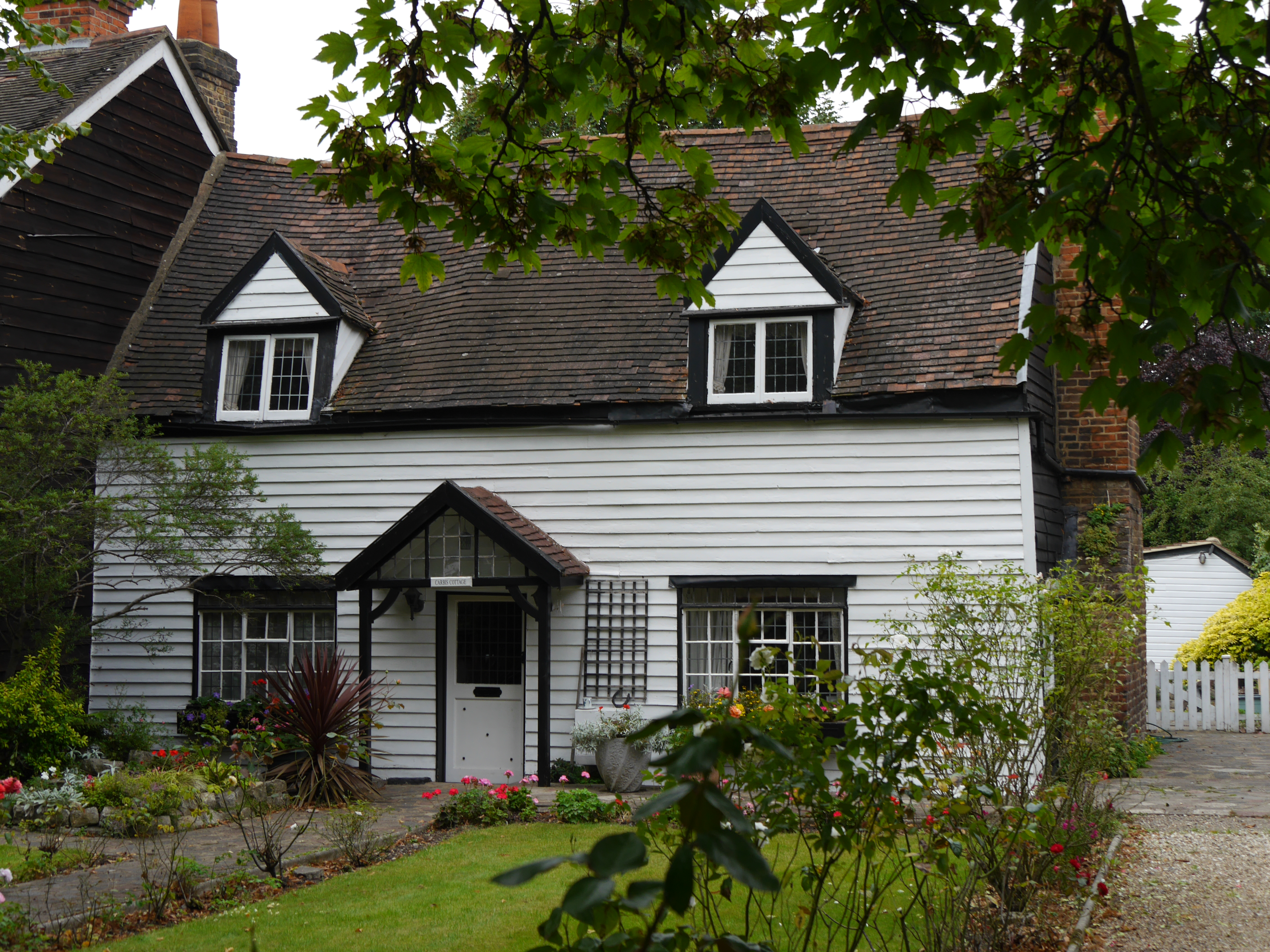
Carbis Cottage

Carbis Cottage is a Grade II listed house at The Green, Chingford, London, E4 7EN.

It was probably built in the 17th century.
