= Vestry House Museum =

Museum in Walthamstow, London

Coordinates: 51°35′0″N 0°0′45″W

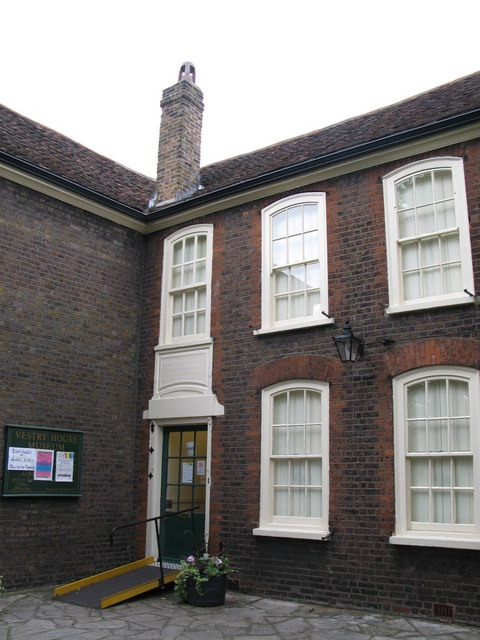
- The museum courtyard
- Established: 1931; 95 years ago
- Location: London, E17; United Kingdom
- Type: Local History, Public Archives
- Owner: Waltham Forest Council
- Public transit access: Walthamstow Central
- Website: www.walthamforest.gov.uk/libraries-arts-parks-and-leisure/arts-and-culture/vestry-house-museum

Vestry House Museum is a history museum in Walthamstow focusing on the heritage of the local area. The collection includes various artefacts dating from the Victorian era to the 20th century, including numerous archived documents and photographs.

Situated in Walthamstow Village, the building, now Grade II listed, was constructed in 1730 to house the parish workhouse and was later used as a police station, an armoury, a building merchant’s store, and a private home. In 1931 the building opened to the public as a local history museum..

On permanent display in the museum is the Bremer Car, the first British motor car with an internal combustion engine, which was built by Frederick Bremer (1872–1941) in a workshop at the back of his family home in Connaught Road, Walthamstow. The car first ran in 1892 and was donated to the museum by Bremer in 1933.

In 2023, the museum began a revitalisation led by architects Studio Weave.
