= Richard Foster (philanthropist) =

Richard Foster (14 September 1822–23 December 1910) was a well-to-do City of London merchant who spent considerable sums of his own money on sociable charitable purposes, such as enabling the building of new Anglican churches in London. Three particularly complete examples can be found in Walthamstow, specifically: St Barnabas Walthamstow (1903; arch. W. D. Caröe), St Michael and All Angels Walthamstow (1885; arch. J. M. Bignell). and St Saviour Walthamstow (1874; arch. T. F. Dolman). (The church of St Oswald Walthamstow, also funded by Foster, no longer stands.)

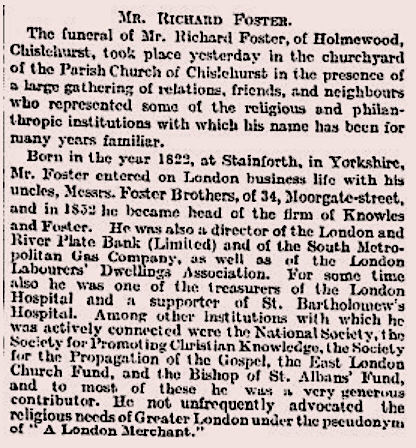
Obituary of Richard Foster, published in The Times [London, England] 28 Dec. 1910: 9

Foster was born in Stainforth, Yorkshire but moved to London to work in the family's financial business of Foster Brothers. He eventually became head of the firm, known then as Knowles and Foster. He was also a director of the London and River Plate Bank and of the Scottish Metropolitan Gas Company.

He seems to have taken an active interest in social matters being a director of the London Labourers Dwelling Association (Society?) and a treasurer for the London Hospital. Among other institutions he actively supported were: St Bartholomew's Hospital, the National Society, the National Society for the Promotion of Christian Knowledge, the Society for the Propagation of the Gospel, the East London Church Fund and the Bishop of St Alban's Fund.

He died at Holmewood, his home in Chislehurst, Kent and was buried in the parish churchyard there.
