= Ferry Boat Inn, Walthamstow =

Historic pub in the London Borough of Waltham Forest

Coordinates: 51°35′13″N 0°03′09″W

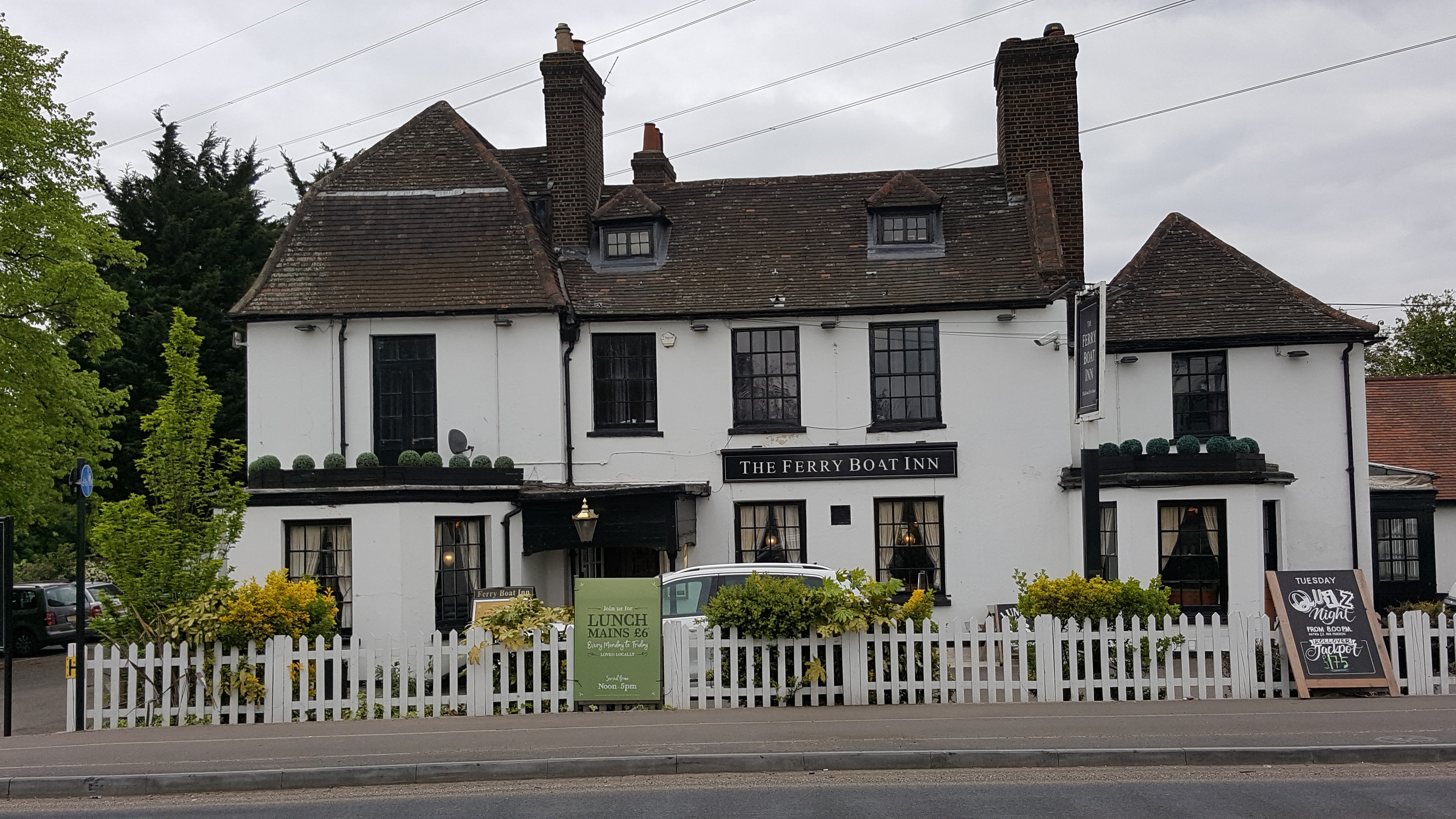
Ferry Boat Inn

The Ferry Boat Inn is a public house situated on the east bank of the River Lea, on Ferry Lane, Walthamstow in the London Borough of Waltham Forest. The oldest parts of the building date from the early 18th century, and it is a Grade II listed building, first registered by the Municipal Borough of Walthamstow in 1951.

== Site ==
=== Context ===
The building was erected in the Walthamstow Marshes, which together with the Tottenham Marshes separated Walthamstow in Essex (now the London Borough of Waltham Forest) from Tottenham in Middlesex (now the London Borough of Haringay). The boundary line through the marshes follows the River Lea. In some places the river, and with it the boundary line, has been re-routed to accommodate parts of the Lee Valley Reservoir Chain, but at Ferry Lane the river has an unchanged alignment.

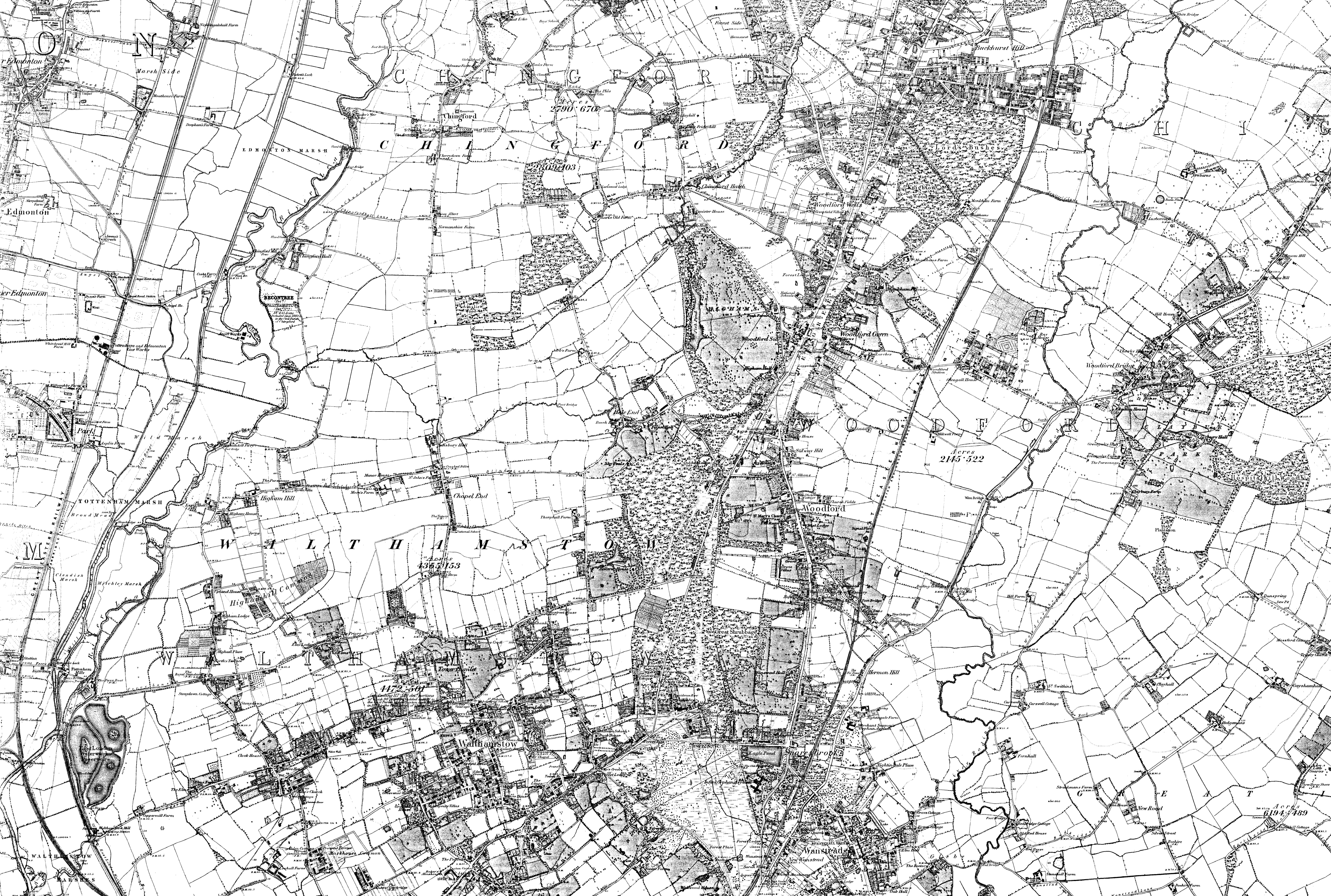

The Ferry Boat Inn, just north of the East London Waterworks Reservoirs. As shown on the Map of Essex Sheet 065, Ordnance Survey, 1872-1890

The site is adjacent to the Walthamstow Wetlands nature reserve (previously known as the 'Walthamstow Reservoirs') which occupies much of the original extent of the Walthamstow Marshes, with much of the remainder being managed as the Walthamstow Marshes nature reserve, with other areas having been developed.

The site was part of the Manor (Estate) of Walthamstow Tony (sometimes spelled Toni), one of the landholdings which made up the parish of Walthamstow. The Manor had a number of fisheries along the river, with six in existence in 1066. The last of these was known as Walthamstow Ferry Fishery, which used the inn as its headquarters. A 15lb salmon caught there in 1833 was the last known salmon on the Lea.

=== Ferry and bridge ===
There is a long history of the site being used as the site for a ferry and a bridge. In 1760 Sir William Maynard rebuilt the main bridge as a private toll-bridge, suitable for horses and carriages. Constructed mostly of timber with iron abutments, it was called Ferry Bridge or Hillyer's Turnpike after Sacheverell Hillyer, the ferryman and landlord of the inn. The parishioners of Walthamstow had the right to use the bridge without paying a toll.

In 1868, the East London Waterworks Company bought the bridge and inn, and removed the tolls.

== Public house ==
The building was initially a ferry house, and was rebuilt after 1738. The oldest parts date from the early 18th century, but the fabric of the pub is thought to also include late-18th-century additions. The pub has several rooms and fireplaces; a large garden at the rear, with some seating; and a water pump at the front.

From 1863 to 1868 the manor of Walthamstow Tony used the inn for sittings of the manorial court.

The inn is known for its historic apple trees and its annual apple yowling (also known as wassailing) event, which celebrates the centuries-old tradition of blessing the trees. The event is held on Old Twelfth Night in January.
