= Hardwick (surname) =

Hardwick is a surname. Notable people with the surname include:

- Alan Hardwick (born 1949), English television presenter
- Anna Elisabeth Hartwick (1796–1882), Swedish lace industrialist
- Ben Hardwick (1981–1985), liver transplant patient
- Bess of Hardwick, English noble
- Billy Hardwick (1941–2013), American ten-pin bowler
- Charlie Hardwick (born 1960), English actress
- Chris Hardwick (born 1971), American actor and comedian
- Chris Hardwick (speed cuber)
- Christopher George Hardwick, English clergyman
- Chuck Hardwick (1941−2025), state legislator in New Jersey
- Damien Hardwick (born 1972), Australian rules footballer
- Elizabeth Hardwick (writer) (1916–2007), American literary critic and writer
- George Hardwick (1920–2004), English soccer player
- Hank Hardwick (1903–1961), American football coach
- Harold Hardwick (1888–1959), Australian sportsman
- Huntington Hardwick (1892–1949), American football player
- John Hardwick (born 1965), British film director
- Johnny Hardwick (1963–2023), American voice actor and comedian
- Lorna Hardwick, classicist
- Matt Hardwick (born 1974), British trance music disc jockey
- Michael Hardwick (writer) (1924−1991), English author
- Michael Hardwick, challenged sodomy laws in the U.S. state of Georgia
- Michelle Hardwick (born 1976), English actress
- Mollie Hardwick (1916–2003), English author
- Neil Hardwick (born 1948), British-born Finnish theatre and TV director and writer
- Nick Hardwick (American football) (born 1981), American professional football player
- Omari Hardwick (born 1974), American actor
- Otto Hardwick (1904–1970), American saxophonist
- Paul Hardwick (1918–1983, English actor
- Peter Hardwick (born 1958), Australian food horticulturist and environmentalist
- Philip Hardwick (1792 –1870), English architect
- Philip Charles Hardwick (1822–1892), English architect
- Rob Hardwick, English rugby player
- Robert Hardwick, English-Canadian Anglican bishop
- Steve Hardwick (1956–2024), English professional footballer
- Taylor Hardwick (1925–2014), American architect
- Thomas Hardwick, Sr. (1725–1798), English master mason and architect
- Thomas Hardwick (1752–1829), English architect
- Thomas W. Hardwick (1872–1944), American politician
- Walter Hardwick (1932–2005), Canadian academic
- William Hardwick (1860–1941), Australian architect
- William G. Hardwick (1910–1993), American politician

== See also ==
- Hardwicke (surname)
