= Grade I and II* listed buildings in the London Borough of Redbridge =

There are over 9,000 Grade I listed buildings and 20,000 Grade II* listed buildings in England. This page is a list of these buildings in the London Borough of Redbridge.

== Grade I ==
Name	Location	Type	Completed (Note: The date given is the date used by Historic England as significant for the initial building or that of an important part in the structure's description.)	Date designated	Grid ref. (Note: Sometimes known as OSGB36, the grid reference is based on the British national grid reference system used by the Ordnance Survey.) Geo-coordinates	Entry number (Note: The "List Entry Number" is a unique number assigned to each listed building and scheduled monument by Historic England.)	Image
Church of St Mary	Wanstead	Church	1790	20 December 1954	TQ4095787784; 51°34′17″N 0°01′57″E	1081008	Church of St Mary More images

== Grade II* ==
Name	Location	Type	Completed	Date designated	Grid ref. Geo-coordinates	Entry number	Image
Chapel, Ilford Hospital of St Mary and St Thomas of Canterbury	Ilford	Chapel	Earlier origins	10 April 1954	TQ4354586368; 51°33′29″N 0°04′09″E	1300587	Chapel, Ilford Hospital of St Mary and St Thomas of Canterbury More images
Christ Church	Wanstead	Church	1860-1	11 November 1968	TQ4037388468; 51°34′39″N 0°01′28″E	1081017	Christ Church More images
Dr Barnardo's Memorial	Barkingside	Exedra	1908	22 February 1979	TQ4450089520; 51°35′10″N 0°05′04″E	1081001	Dr Barnardo's Memorial More images
Former Merchant Seamen's Orphan Asylum at Wanstead Hospital. Chapel to the North West of Wanstead Hospital	Wanstead	Chapel	1861-3	22 February 1979	TQ4050089224; 51°35′04″N 0°01′35″E	1200737	Former Merchant Seamen's Orphan Asylum at Wanstead Hospital. Chapel to the North West of Wanstead Hospital More images
Garden Temple in Back Garden of Number 14, The Avenue (Temple House)	Wanstead	Garden Temple	1730–40	20 December 1954	TQ4080488452; 51°34′38″N 0°01′50″E	1357974	Upload Photo
Gazebo and Grotto Below in Back Garden of Number 20, The Avenue	Wanstead	Gazebo	Early 18th century	20 December 1954	TQ4084688480; 51°34′39″N 0°01′52″E	1081021	Upload Photo
Godfrey Monument in St Mary's Churchyard	Woodford	Commemorative Monument	c. 1742	22 February 1979	TQ3999690703; 51°35′52″N 0°01′11″E	1357983	Godfrey Monument in St Mary's Churchyard More images
Hurst House, "The Naked Beauty"	Woodford Green	House	Early 18th century	20 December 1954	TQ3998091332; 51°36′12″N 0°01′11″E	1357975	Hurst House, "The Naked Beauty" More images
Pair of Gatepiers at Entrance to Overton Drive	Wanstead	Gate Pier	1715–22	20 December 1954	TQ4034787582; 51°34′11″N 0°01′25″E	1081022	Pair of Gatepiers at Entrance to Overton Drive
Raikes Mausoleum in St Mary's Churchyard	Woodford	Sarcophagus	c. 1797	22 February 1979	TQ3999090737; 51°35′53″N 0°01′11″E	1183475	Raikes Mausoleum in St Mary's Churchyard
Railings, Gates and Gatepiers to Valentines Park	Ilford	Gate	Late 18th century	10 April 1954	TQ4335187771; 51°34′14″N 0°04′01″E	1081027	Railings, Gates and Gatepiers to Valentines Park More images
Valentines Mansion	Ilford	Country House	Late 17th century	10 April 1954	TQ4329887939; 51°34′20″N 0°03′59″E	1081014	Valentines Mansion More images
