= Thomas Hardwick (disambiguation) =

Thomas Hardwick (1752–1829) was an English architect.

Thomas Hardwick may also refer to:

- Thomas Hardwick Sr. (1725–1798), English master mason and architect
- Thomas W. Hardwick (1872–1944), American politician
- Thomas Hardwicke (1756–1835), British soldier and naturalist

== See also ==
- Hardwick (disambiguation)
