= Shephall =

Area of Stevenage, Hertfordshire, England

Coordinates: 51.890441°N 0.176453°W

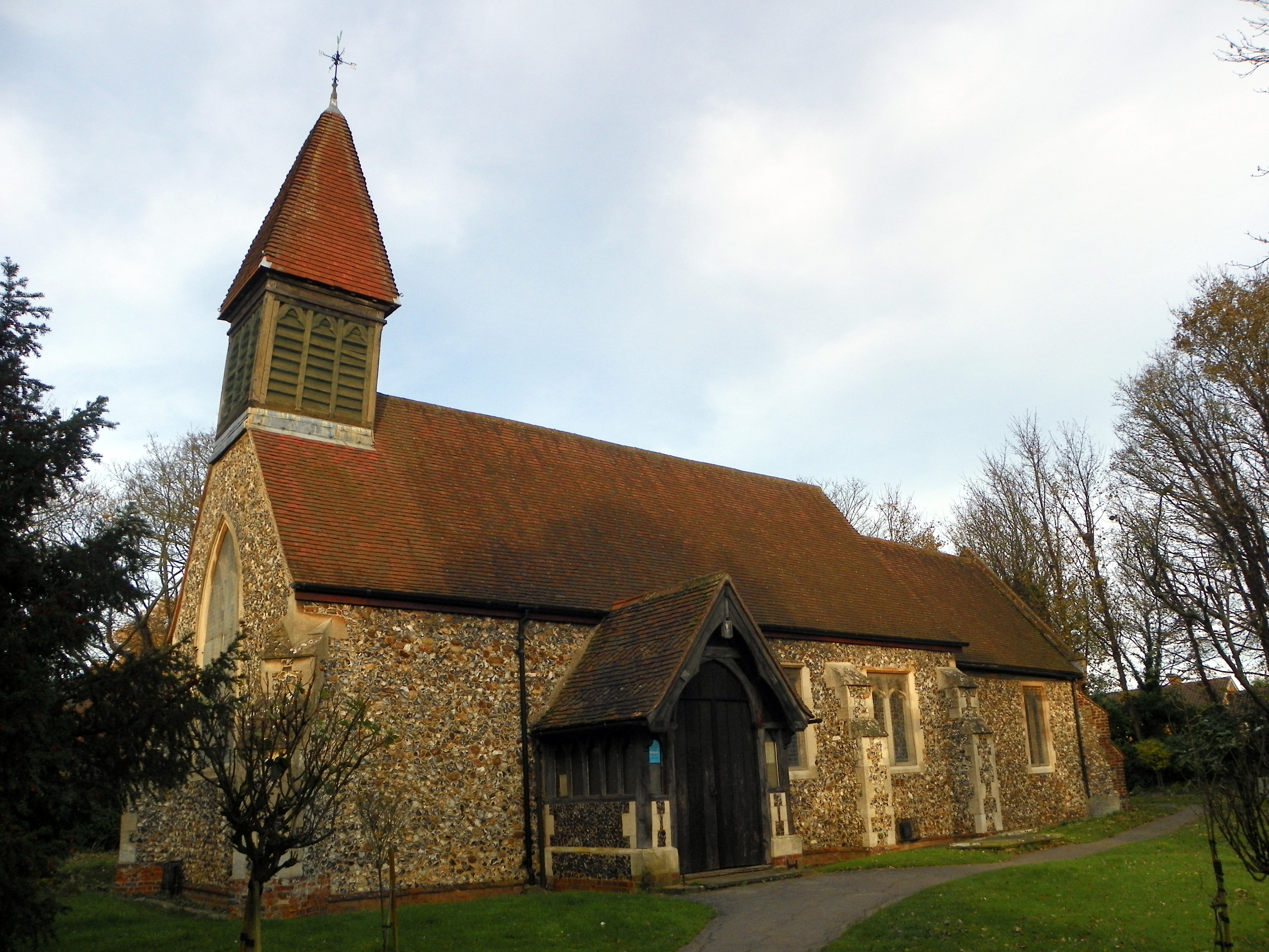
- St Mary's Church, Shephall

- Location within Hertfordshire
- Population: 6,210 (2011 Census. Shephall Ward)
- OS grid reference: TL256228
- District: Stevenage
- Shire county: Hertfordshire
- Region: East
- Country: England
- Sovereign state: United Kingdom
- Post town: Stevenage
- Postcode district: SG2
- Dialling code: 01438
- UK Parliament: Stevenage

Shephall (SHEP-all) is a neighbourhood of the town of Stevenage, in Hertfordshire, England. It was formerly a separate village and parish, being absorbed into Stevenage in 1953.

== Name ==
Spellings of Shephall have included: Scepa-halh (before 1066); Escepehale (in the Domesday Book of 1086); Sepehale (in the St Albans Abbey rolls for 1077–93); Sepehalle, Scephale and Shephale (11th and 12th centuries); Schephale, Shepehale and Chepehale (15th century); and Shepehalle and Shepholde (16th century). It was often called Sheephall in the 19th century. The English Place-Names Society translates the name as "a corner of land where sheep are pastured". The meaning "ash-tree slope" has also been supported, but evidence from the nearby Fairlands, which has origins in the Scandinavian word faar, meaning "sheep", makes it more likely that "Shephall" does mean "a sheep pasture".

== History ==
=== Before 1946 ===
Before the new town of Stevenage was built, Shephall existed as a village, separated from the old town of Stevenage by three miles of fields and woodlands. Shephall was connected to the main road from Stevenage to Hertford by Shephall Lane, at the hamlet of Broadwater. Shephall has a distinct history from the rest of Stevenage.

Sometime before the Norman Conquest of England in 1066, a church was built in "Scepa-halh", probably of wood. It was built in a corner of the parish, close to the parish of Aston, possibly in a "no man's land" between manors, and people soon moved close to it. At this time, the entire manor of five hides, made up of arable land, meadows, woodland and pasture, was held by the Abbot of St Albans. After the conquest, two of the hides were obtained by the Archbishop of Canterbury.

The Domesday Book of 1086 shows that "Escepehale" was in the Hundred of Broadwater, and it lists 11 villagers, two cottagers and one slave in 1086, though the actual population is unsure as each individual listed may have represented a household, and the entry may not include the entire population. The population could have been around 56 people. Some time after 1086, the hides owned by the Archbishop of Canterbury were re-acquired by Abbot Paul of St Albans, and the whole manor of Shephall was then owned by St Albans Abbey for 450 years. In this time, Shephall was brought into the Hundred of Cashio. Shephall was closely associated with its neighbour, Aston, which was larger and more prosperous than both Shephall and Stevenage. A small wooden church, St Mary's, was built in Shephall in the 12th century, and was replaced in the late 14th and early 15th centuries by one of brick and stone. The church was confirmed to the monastery of St Alban by Pope Honorius III in 1218, and a vicarage was ordained and endowed.

Following the Dissolution of the Monasteries, specifically that of St Albans Abbey in 1539, the manor of Shephall was granted to George Nodes in 1542 by King Henry VIII, together with a pension of five shillings. Nodes was a Serjeant at Arms and Serjeant of the Buckhounds to the King (and later to Edward VI, Mary I, and Elizabeth I), and was already farming the manor. The manor passed through the Nodes family, and eventually, George Nodes' great-great-nephew, Charles Nodes, became Lord of the manor in 1634. In 1664, another George Nodes also inherited the manors of Holwell and Langford. The Nodes family lived in the original, small manor house known as Shephalbury Manor. The house had twelve rooms and domestic offices.

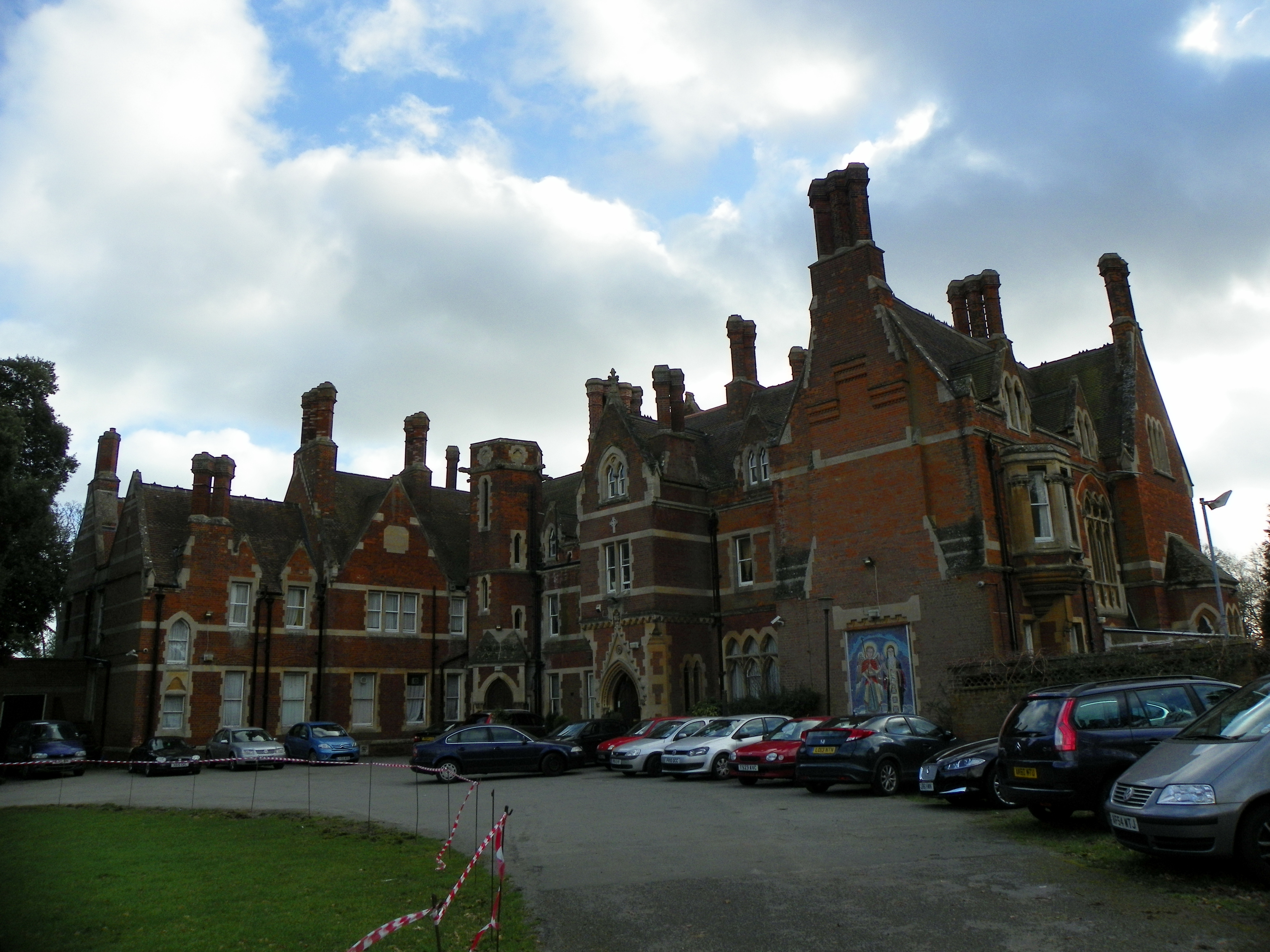
The manor house in 2014.

The Lordship of the Manor of Shephall remained in the Nodes family until 1761, when John Nodes died. No male heirs could be found, so the estate was split between his three daughters. After 1782, one of the daughters, Sarah Jacques sold her share to Michael Heathcote of London. Heathcote's grandson, Samuel Unwin, inherited this share in 1818, and the rest was later sold to him. Now Lord of the manor, he changed his name to Samuel Heathcote Unwin Heathcote. His son, Unwin Unwin Heathcote, succeeded him in 1862, and had a new neo-Gothic house built, designed by T. Roger Smith. It was completed in 1864. The old house was demolished and a rose garden was planted on the site.

A new village school was built in Shephall at the same time as the new Shephall Manor, to replace the cottage that was previously used as a school. The Red Lion inn, opposite the church, was built in the 18th century or earlier. Other buildings in the village were the Vicarage (later the Rectory), Bury Farmhouse and cottages, many of which were situated on the village green.

Shephall parish contained part of the hamlet of Broadwater, while the parts of the hamlet on the west side of the Great North Road were in Knebworth parish. Broadwater House was also in Shephall parish, but has since been demolished. Also within the parish, close to the boundary with Aston in the south, was Broom Barns, containing about six houses and a farm. Other farms in Shephall were Home Farm, whose farmhouse still exists, though considerably rebuilt, as number 40 Shephall Green, and Half Hyde, of 600 acres. Half Hyde was a separate manor from that of Shephall.

The parish of Shephall was included in the Hitchin Poor Law Union from 1835. It therefore became part of the Hitchin Rural Sanitary District in 1872, which in turn became the Hitchin Rural District in 1894.

Records indicate that the population of Shephall was less than 100 in 1700, 120 in 1801, 265 in 1841 and 194 in 1921.

After Unwin Unwin Heathcote died in 1893, Colonel Alfred Unwin Heathcote was the last of the family to live at the manor. After his death in 1912, the house was let to Colonel Woods, then to David Augustus Bevan in 1926 and Lieutenant Colonel Morgan Grenville Gavin in 1937. The Heathcotes remained the Lords of the Manor and retained interest in village affairs until 1939 when the manor was sold by Michael Heathcote to William Harriman Moss. During the Second World War, the house was used to house children who had been evacuated there by the Waifs and Strays society. When they left, it became a convalescent home for Polish officers, and then a school for Polish children.

=== As part of Stevenage new town ===
The building of the new town of Stevenage was approved in 1946 and started in the early 1950s. The new town was initially developed as six neighbourhoods, each with its own facilities including shops and schools. Surrounding parishes, such as Knebworth, Datchworth and Aston, lost some of their land to the designated development area, but Shephall was entirely engulfed and lost its separate identity, becoming a neighbourhood of the new town. In 1951 the parish had a population of 432. The civil parish of Shephall was absorbed into Stevenage Urban District on 1 April 1953. The area north of Broadhall Way, including the old village green and the buildings around it, became the Shephall neighbourhood, and the area to the south, including the manor house and its surroundings, became the Broadwater neighbourhood. The modern district council ward of Shephall covers the 1950s neighbourhood and Shephall Green, but is smaller in area than the former parish.

In September 1947, Shephall Manor was commandeered by the Stevenage Development Corporation, who leased it to the Inner London Education Authority. The grounds were then opened for public recreation. Development of the Shephall neighbourhood started in 1953, with new buildings surrounding the old ones. Four cottages built on Shephall Lane for Corporation staff were among the first houses to be built in the New Town. Two estates, Leaves Spring and Loves Wood, were named after existing features of the landscape. The neighbourhood was completed in 1959. Several parts of the original Shephall survived, including the village green, church, Old Red Lion public house, and some cottages and other buildings, but they were cut off from their former surroundings by Broadhall Way.

A neighbourhood shopping centre was built at The Hyde, 0.5 miles (0.80 km) east of the old village. In August 1956, Shephall received a community centre, the Broadwater Centre, which was opened by Dame Evelyn Sharp. New schools were needed, so Shephalbury Secondary Modern School, Homefield School, Heathcote School and Barnwell School were built. Shephalbury Secondary Modern School closed in the 1980s and was annexed by the Stevenage College of Further Education. The original core of the village was designated as the Shephall Green conservation area in 1973. As well as St Mary's, Shephall contains two further places of worship: St Hilda's Church (Roman Catholic) and Grace Community Church (Newfrontiers).

After the New Towns Act 1981, Shephall Manor and most of its land was owned by the New Towns Commission, and the rest was already owned by Hertfordshire County Council. The Inner London Education Authority was disbanded so the Manor was no longer required as a school. The Shephalbury Manor Action Committee was formed to save the site from development, as the Manor was not listed and the trees were not subject to preservation orders. Their campaign was successful, and in November 1988, it was listed under the Town and Country Planning Act 1971 as a building of special architectural and historic interest and achieved Grade II listed status. The house was bought by the Coptic Orthodox Church and the grounds were opened to the public as one of Stevenage's district parks.

The well canopy in the green, dating to the early 20th century, that covers a medieval well, was scheduled to be removed and not replaced by Stevenage Borough Council in 2012, but was saved after local residents' protests led to a public consultation. The structure was repaired and is now listed on Hertfordshire County Council's Historic Environment Record.
