= Hartnick =

Hartnick is a surname. Notable people with the surname include:

- Hans-Joachim Hartnick (born 1955), East German cyclist

== See also ==
- Hartwick (disambiguation)
