= Sukkat Shalom =

Sukkat Shalom may refer to:

== Buildings ==
- Sukkat Shalom Reform Synagogue in London, England
- Sukkat Shalom in Edinburgh, Scotland
- Belgrade Synagogue in Belgrade, Serbia
- Sukkat Shalom Synagogue in Jerusalem (see Synagogues of Jerusalem)

== Places ==
- Sukkat Shalom, a courtyard neighborhood surrounding the Mahane Yehuda Market in Jerusalem
