= Hardwick =

Hardwick and Hardwicke are common place names in England—this is from the Old English pre-7th century word "heorde", meaning a "herd or flock", with "wic", which like the later Viking word "thorp" described an outlying farm or settlement, which was dependent on a larger village. In some cases, "Hardwick" and "Hardwicke" are interchangeable and the spelling has evolved over time.

== Places ==
=== United Kingdom ===
- Hardwick, Buckinghamshire
- Hardwick, Cambridgeshire
- Hardwick Hall, Derbyshire, home of Bess of Hardwick
- Hardwick Hall, County Durham
  - Hardwick Hall Country Park
- Hardwick, County Durham
- Hardwick, Lincolnshire
- Hardwick, Monmouthshire
- Hardwick, Norfolk
  - RAF Hardwick, Norfolk
- Hardwick, Northamptonshire
- Hardwick, Cherwell, Oxfordshire
- Hardwick, West Oxfordshire, Oxfordshire
- Hardwick, Rutland, a lost settlement in the United Kingdom
- Hardwick, Suffolk
- Hardwick, Walsall, an area in Walsall
- Hardwick Village, Nottinghamshire
- East Hardwick, West Yorkshire
- West Hardwick, West Yorkshire
- Kempston Hardwick, Bedfordshire
- Kites Hardwick, Warwickshire
- Priors Hardwick, Warwickshire

=== The Netherlands ===
- Harderwijk

=== United States ===
- Hardwick, California
- Hardwick, Baldwin County, Georgia
- Hardwick, Bryan County, Georgia
- Hardwick, Massachusetts
- Hardwick, Minnesota
- Hardwick, Vermont, a New England town
  - Hardwick (CDP), Vermont, village in the town
  - East Hardwick, Vermont, village in the town
- Hardwick Field, an airport in Tennessee
- Hardwick Township, New Jersey

=== Australia ===
- Hardwicke Street, New South Wales

== Business ==
- Hardwick Clothes, the oldest manufacturer of tailor-made clothing in the United States
- Hardwick Stove Company, a former cooking appliance manufacturer merged with Maytag in 1981
- Hardwick and Woodbury Railroad, a former railroad in Vermont, U.S.A.

== Other uses ==
- Hardwick (surname)
- Hardwicke (surname)
- Hardwick (appliances), a Maytag brand
- No 790 Hardwicke, a LNWR Improved Precedent Class speed-record-breaking steam engine during the Race to the North

== See also ==
- Hartwick
- Herdwick, a breed of sheep from the Lake District, England
- Hardwicke
