= Holy Trinity Gough Square =

Coordinates: 51°30′55″N 0°06′31″W

Holy Trinity
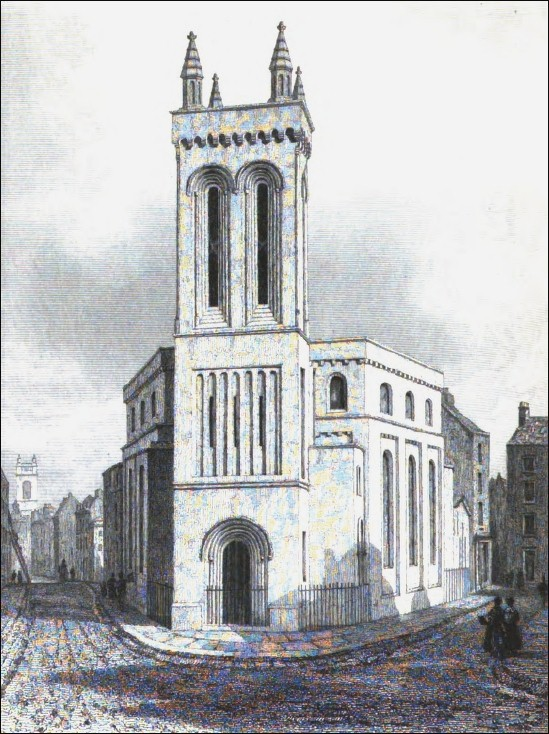

General information
- Architectural style: Romanesque Revival architecture
- Location: City of London, England
- Construction started: 1838
- Completed: 1842
- Demolished: 1906
- Cost: £1,600
- Client: Anglican Church

Design and construction
- Architect: John Shaw
- Engineer: Thomas Robinson

Holy Trinity Gough Square was a Victorian church in the City of London.

== History ==
Trinity Church was built in the parish of St Bride's in the City of London, on the initiative of the vicar, the Reverend Thomas Dale, who felt that the parish church was inadequate for the size of the population. He first proposed a schoolroom that would double as an occasional chapel, but soon found that it would be practical to build a church, funded by subscriptions, and grants from the Church Commissioners and the Metropolitan fund for the erection of churches. The first stone was laid on 3 October 1837, and the building was consecrated on 21 June the next year. The architect was John Shaw (Junior).

The church was built on a small, triangular site, at the junction of Great New Street and Pemberton Row, given by the Goldsmiths Company.

The main body of the church was hexagonal, with a large octagonal recess on the eastern side serving as a chancel. Two galleries supported on small iron columns ran around the church, with an organ in the upper gallery on the west side, over the main entrance. The exterior was faced in yellow brick, with round-headed windows. There was Norman-style tower topped by pinnacles.

The church seated 1100, half in free seats, the others rented at between 3 and 6 shillings a year. The social reformer Charles Booth noted it served the area's poorer citizens.

As the century wore on legislation was passed to reduce the number of City churches and after a comparatively short existence the then Bishop of London authorised the reunification of the two parishes, the proceeds from the sale going towards the building of St Mellitus, Hanwell.

== See also ==
- Men and Ghosts of Gough Square, A. Edward Newton, 1930 (Printed at the expense of the author. The entire receipts to go to the pension fund established by Cecil Harmsworth, esquire, for the caretakers of the Johnson house in Gough Square.); again in 1947; Spottiswoode, Ballantyne & Co, London, with a memoir of the author by Cecil Harmsworth, 1st Baron Harmsworth.
