= Philip Charles Hardwick =

English architect (1822–1892)

Philip Charles Hardwick (London 1822–1892) was an English architect.

== Life ==
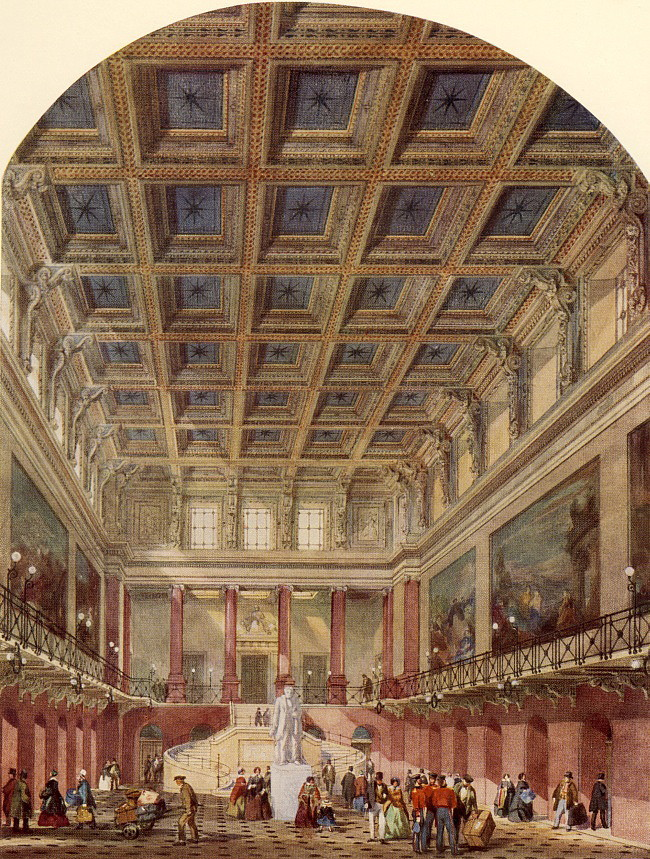
Hardwick's impression of the Great Hall at Euston Station, 1844.

Philip Charles Hardwick was born in Westminster in London, the son of the architect Philip Hardwick (1792–1870) and grandson of architect Thomas Hardwick (junior) (1752–1825). His mother was also from an eminent architectural family, the Shaws. Philip Charles Hardwick's maternal grandfather was John Shaw Senior (1776–1832) and his uncle was John Shaw Jr (1803–1870).

Hardwick trained under his father and also Edward Blore. He exhibited regularly at the Royal Academy between 1848 and 1854.

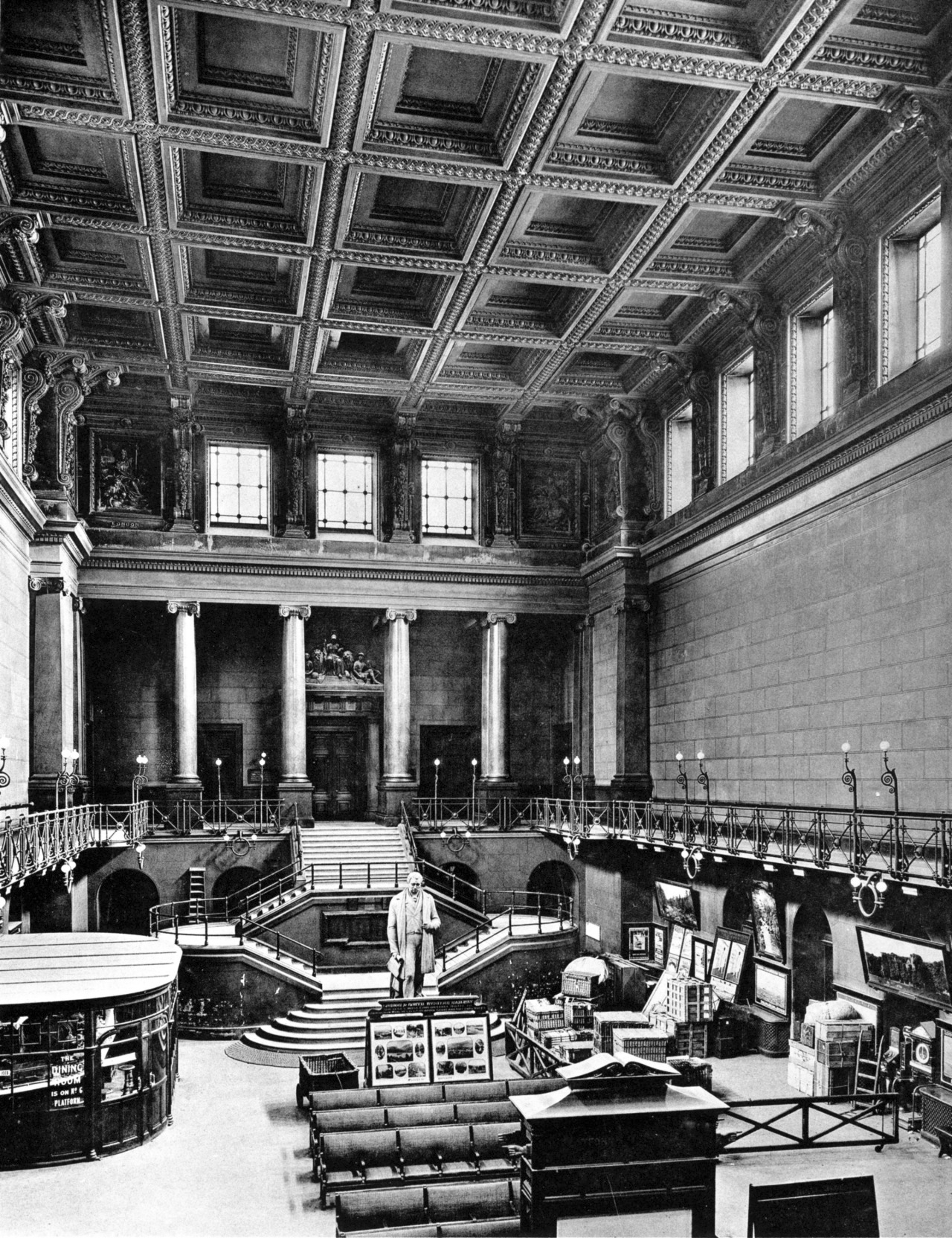
The former Great Hall with a statue of George Stephenson by Edward Hodges Baily.

Hardwick worked in the City of London, where he became the leading architect of grandiose banking offices, mainly in an Italianate manner. He designed five City banks, including Drummond's in Trafalgar Square (1879–81), and was architect to the Bank of England from 1855 to 1883. He was employed outside London designing branch offices at Hull (1856) and Leeds (1862–65).

His best known work was the Great Hall of London's Euston railway station (opened on 27 May 1849). The Great Hall was demolished in 1962 to make way for construction of the current Euston Station building.

Hardwick, like his grandfather Thomas Hardwick, was the Surveyor to St Bartholomew's Hospital in London and also a major benefactor. He was also an adviser in the new War Office and Admiralty competition of 1884. While he had been a favourite architect of Queen Victoria to design the Albert Memorial in Kensington Gardens but his design fell short with the advisory committee.

Arthur William Blomfield was Hardwick's pupil in 1852–55.

== Family history ==
Hardwick retired to Wimbledon and married in Bath in the early 1870s. Two of his sons went into the military and served in South Africa during the Boer War; one of them, Lieutenant Stephen Thomas Hardwick, was killed in gunfire during the battle of Tweefontein in 1901. Hardwick's daughter, Helen, married Sir Henry George Lyons (1864–1944), later a director of the Science Museum in London.

Philip Charles Hardwick is buried alongside his father, Philip, and the Shaw family in Kensal Green Cemetery, London.

== Notable projects ==
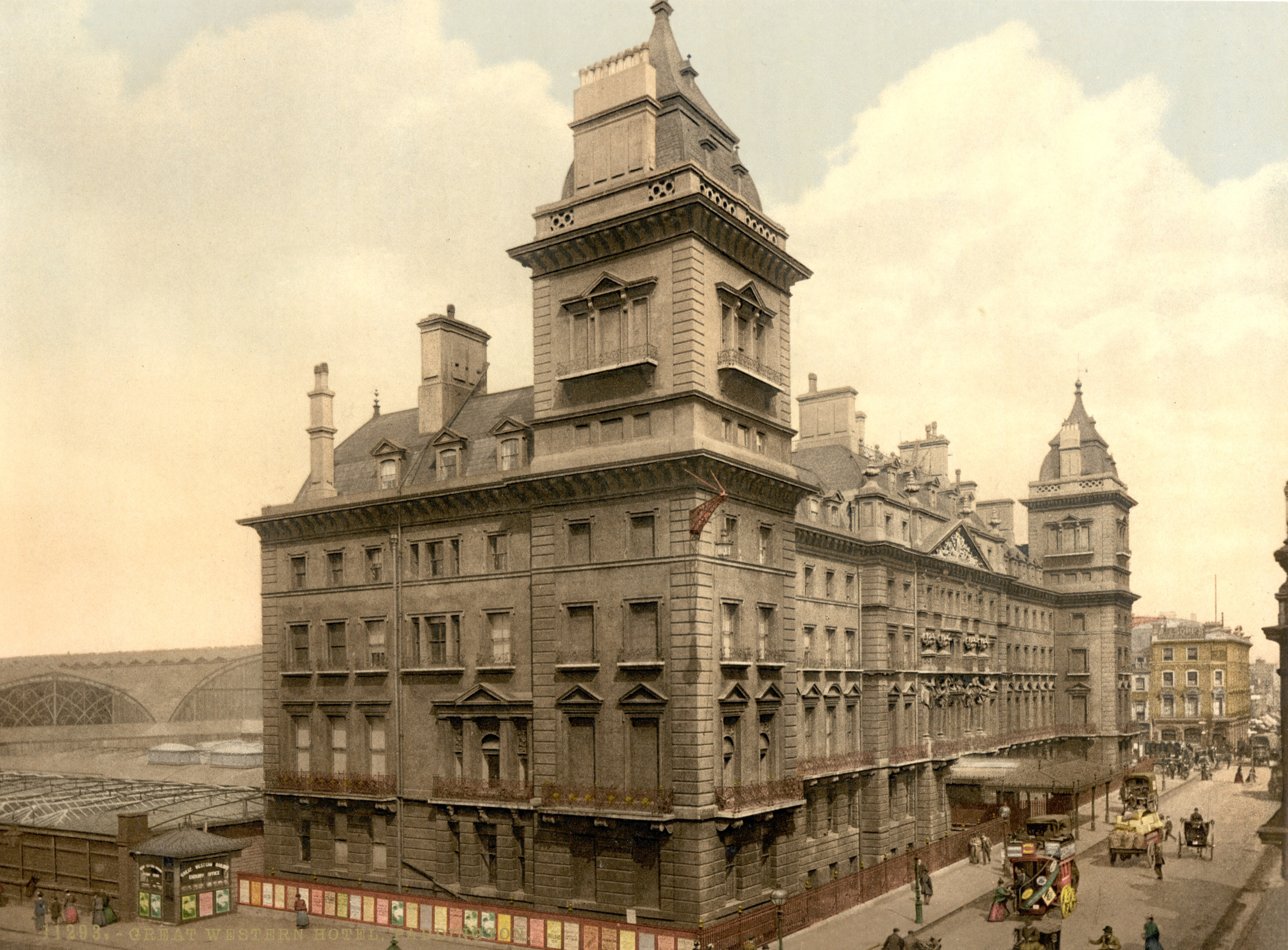
Great Western Royal Hotel, London, now the Hilton London Paddington

- The Queen's Hotel, Birmingham (1837-1857)
- restoration of St Nicholas church, Durweston, Dorset (1847)
- Durham Town Hall (1849–1851)
- Adare Manor, Adare, County Limerick, Ireland (1850–1862)
- Rooms for the fourth Earl Spencer at Althorp (1851)
- restoration of St Mary's Church, Lambeth (1851–1852, now the Museum of Garden History)
- Great Western Royal Hotel at Paddington station (1851–54)
- Chapel of Ease of St Saviour, Shotton, County Durham (1852–1854)
- St John's Church, Deptford (1855)
- Alterations on Uxbridge House, London (1855)
- parts of the Titsey Place estate in Surrey (1856)
- Sompting House (now Sompting Abbotts Preparatory School), Sompting, West Sussex, 1856
- redevelopment of Heslington Hall, near York (1850s)
- St John's Cathedral, Limerick, Ireland (constructed 1856–1861)
- Adhurst St Mary house, Petersfield, Hampshire (1858)
- new wings at the Greenwich Hospital School (now part of the National Maritime Museum) (1861–1862)
- Rendcomb House, now Rendcomb College, Gloucestershire, for Sir Francis Henry Goldsmid (1863)
- Rebuilt Madresfield Court for the 5th Earl of Beauchamp (1863)
- Royal Garrison Church, Aldershot (1863)
- Sovereign House (former Bank of England building), Park Row, Leeds (1864)
- 46–48 Lombard Street, London (1866)
- St Barnabas Church, Mayland, Essex (1867)
- Charterhouse School, near Godalming, Surrey (1872)
- St Edmund's School in Canterbury, Kent
- St Columba's College, Dublin
