= Hardwicke =

Hardwicke may refer to:

- Hardwicke (surname), a surname
- Earl of Hardwicke, a title in the Peerage of Great Britain

== Places ==
=== Australia ===
- Hardwicke Bay, a bay in South Australia
- Hardwicke Bay, South Australia, a locality

=== Canada ===
- Hardwicke Parish, New Brunswick

=== England ===
- Hardwicke, Stroud, Gloucestershire
- Elmstone Hardwicke, Tewkesbury, Gloucestershire
- Hardwicke, Herefordshire, a hamlet in the parish of Clifford, Herefordshire (List of places in Herefordshire#H)

=== New Zealand ===
- Hardwicke, New Zealand

== See also ==
- Hardwick
