= St Peter-in-the-Forest =

Church in Walthamstow, London

Coordinates: 51.587203°N 0.006266°E

Church of St Peter-in-the-Forest, Walthamstow
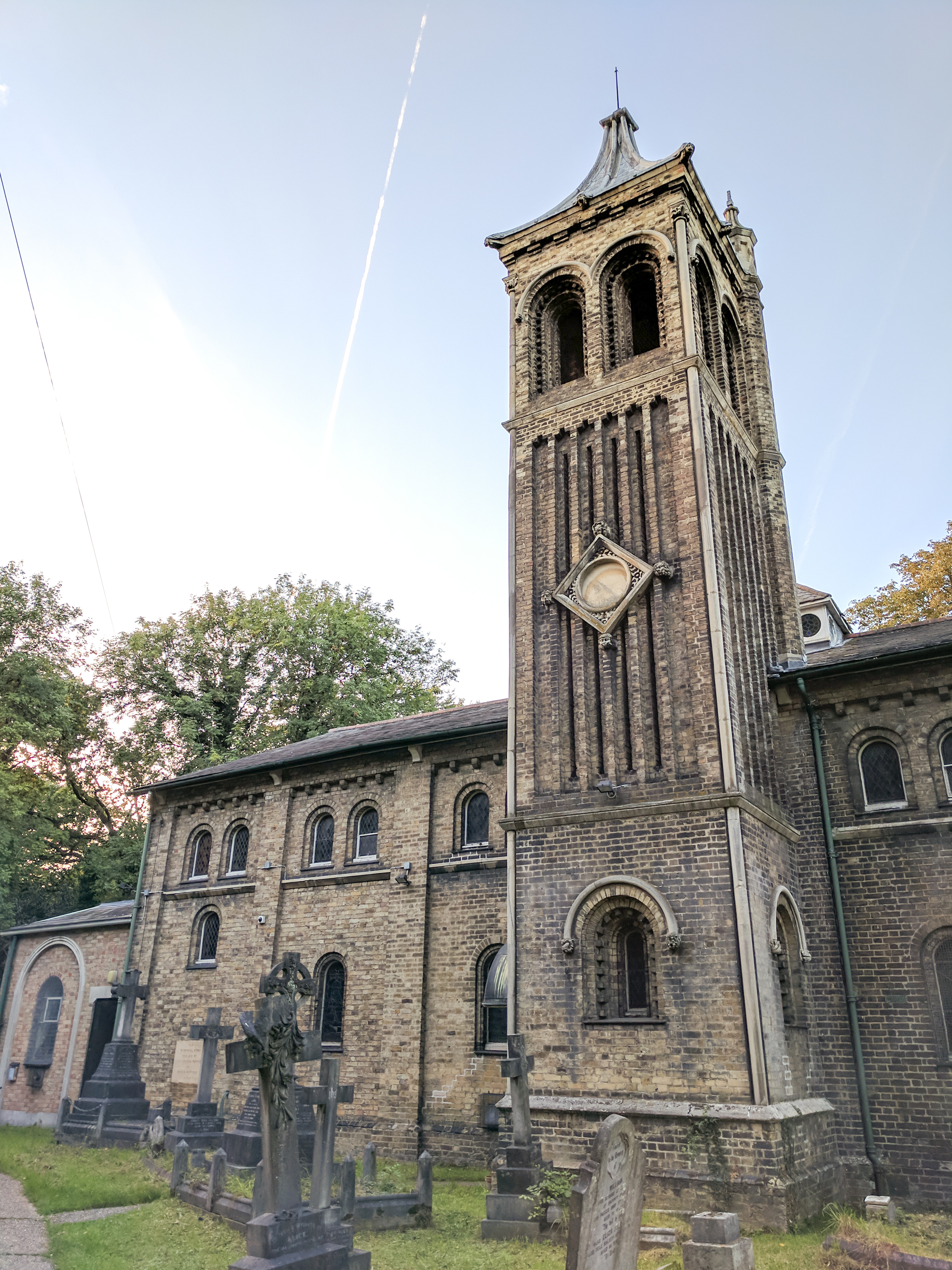
- View of St Peter-in-the-Forest from the south.
- Church of St Peter-in-the-Forest, Walthamstow
- Location: 18 Woodford New Road, Walthamstow, London E17 3PP
- Country: England
- Denomination: Church of England
- Website: https://www.stpeterintheforest.org/

History
- Status: Active
- Founded: 1840
- Dedication: Saint Peter

Architecture
- Functional status: Parish church
- Heritage designation: Grade II listed
- Designated: 14 April 2009
- Architect: John Shaw Jr.
- Style: Italianate architecture

Administration
- Diocese: Chelmsford
- Archdeaconry: West Ham

St Peter-in-the-Forest is a 19th-century Church of England parish church in Walthamstow, London Borough of Waltham Forest, sited adjacent to a small portion of Epping Forest.

== History ==
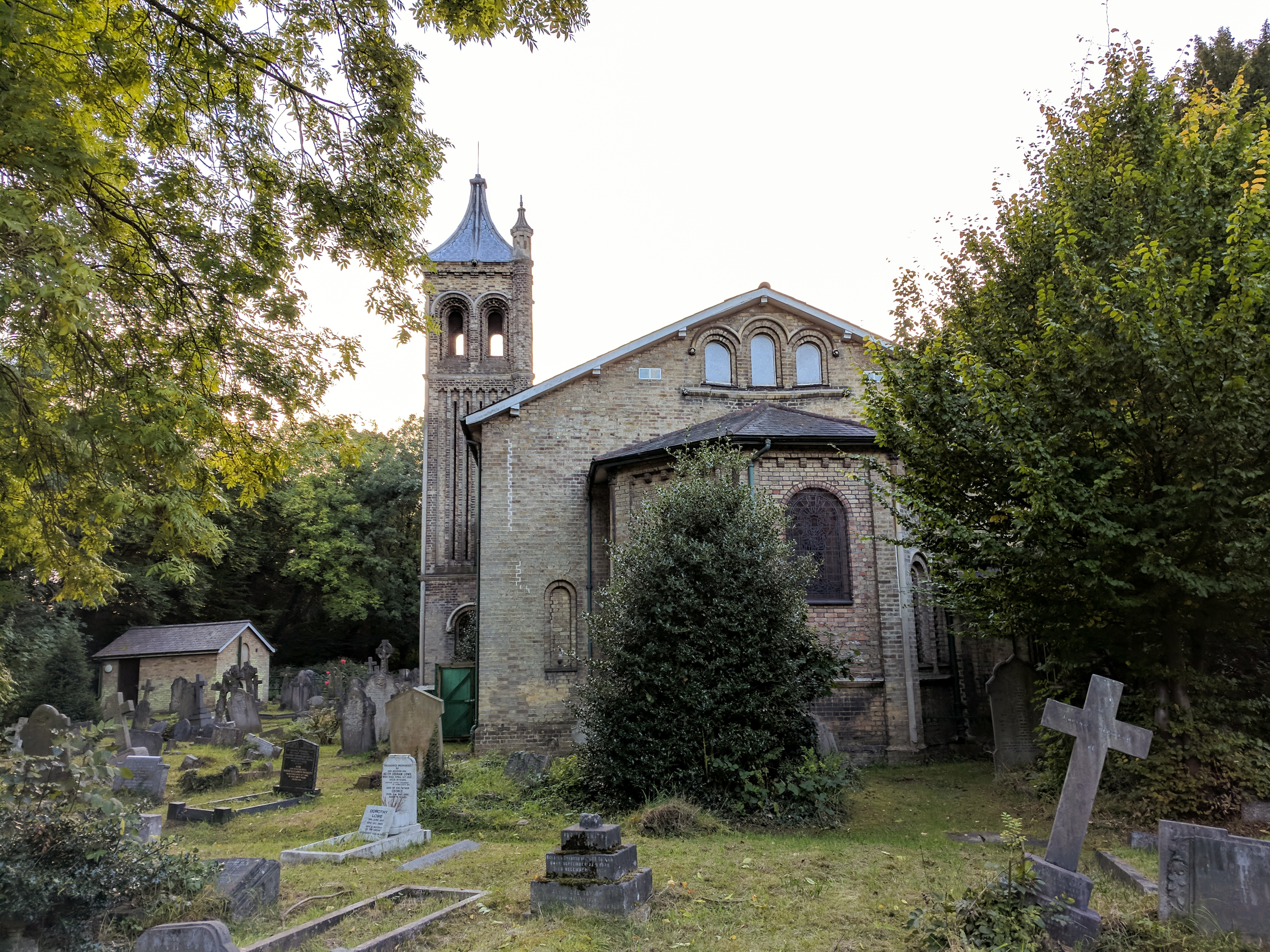
The eastern end of St Peter-in-the-Forest.

The building was founded in 1840 as a chapel of ease to St Mary's Church, Walthamstow, at the instigation of the vicar, William Wilson, who also established two other daughter churches for the rapidly growing town. The new church was designed by the architect John Shaw Jr. and built of London stock brick in the Italianate style. It became a parish of its own in 1844. The church served the nearby Forest School until a school chapel was built in 1857. The advowson, the right to appoint a vicar, was originally held by the vicar of St Mary's, but in 1859 was given to Edward Warner, who had donated £1,000 for a vicarage house and whose son would develop the Warner Estate; it remains with the Warner family to the present. St Peter's was assigned a cemetery in 1845, and extended in westwards in 1887, so that the tower now stands at the centre of the south aisle rather than in the southwest corner.

The interior was remodelled by Martin Travers in 1936–37. In 1945, a V-2 rocket landed nearby causing substantial damage to the north side; this was repaired in 1951 when an entrance lobby and vestries were also added. Further work in 1958 altered the chancel, sanctuary and added a west window depicting Christ the King. A fire in 1975 damaged some original internal fittings.

The church was given Grade II listed building status in 2009 because it was considered "of special architectural interest for its pleasing Italianate Romanesque design by the notable architect John Shaw Junior". However, it later appeared on the Heritage at Risk Register. In 2017 it was announced that St Peter's had been awarded £117,500 by the Heritage Lottery Fund for restoration and improvement of the building to make it more suitable for use by the local community.
