= Hartwick =

The name Hartwick has multiple uses:

== People ==
- Anna Elisabeth Hartwick (1796–1882), Swedish lace industrialist
- John Christopher Hartwick (1714–1796), Lutheran minister in colonial America.
- Edward Hartwick (1871–1918), soldier and namesake of Hartwick Pines State Park

== Places ==
=== United States ===
- Hartwick, Iowa, a city in Powesheik County
- Hartwick, Delaware County, Iowa
- Hartwick, New York
- Hartwick (CDP), New York
- Hartwick Township, Michigan
- Hartwick Pines State Park

== Institutions ==
- Hartwick College, Oneonta, New York

== See also ==
- Hardwick
