= John Shaw Jr. =

English architect

John Shaw Junior

John Shaw Jr. (1803–1870) was an English architect of the 19th century who was complimented as a designer in the "Manner of Wren". He designed buildings in the classical Jacobean fashion and designed some of London's first semi-detached homes in the area close to Chalk Farm. Shaw retired in the early 1860s and moved to Kensington where he died in 1870. He is buried with the Shaw and Hardwick families at Kensal Green Cemetery.

== Family ==
John Shaw Jr. was born in Holborn, London. His father, John Shaw Sr. (1776–1832), was architect to the Port of Ramsgate and Christ's Hospital school in London. Father and son did extensive work at both places while Shaw Senior trained his son; John Shaw Junior designed the lighthouse at Ramsgate.

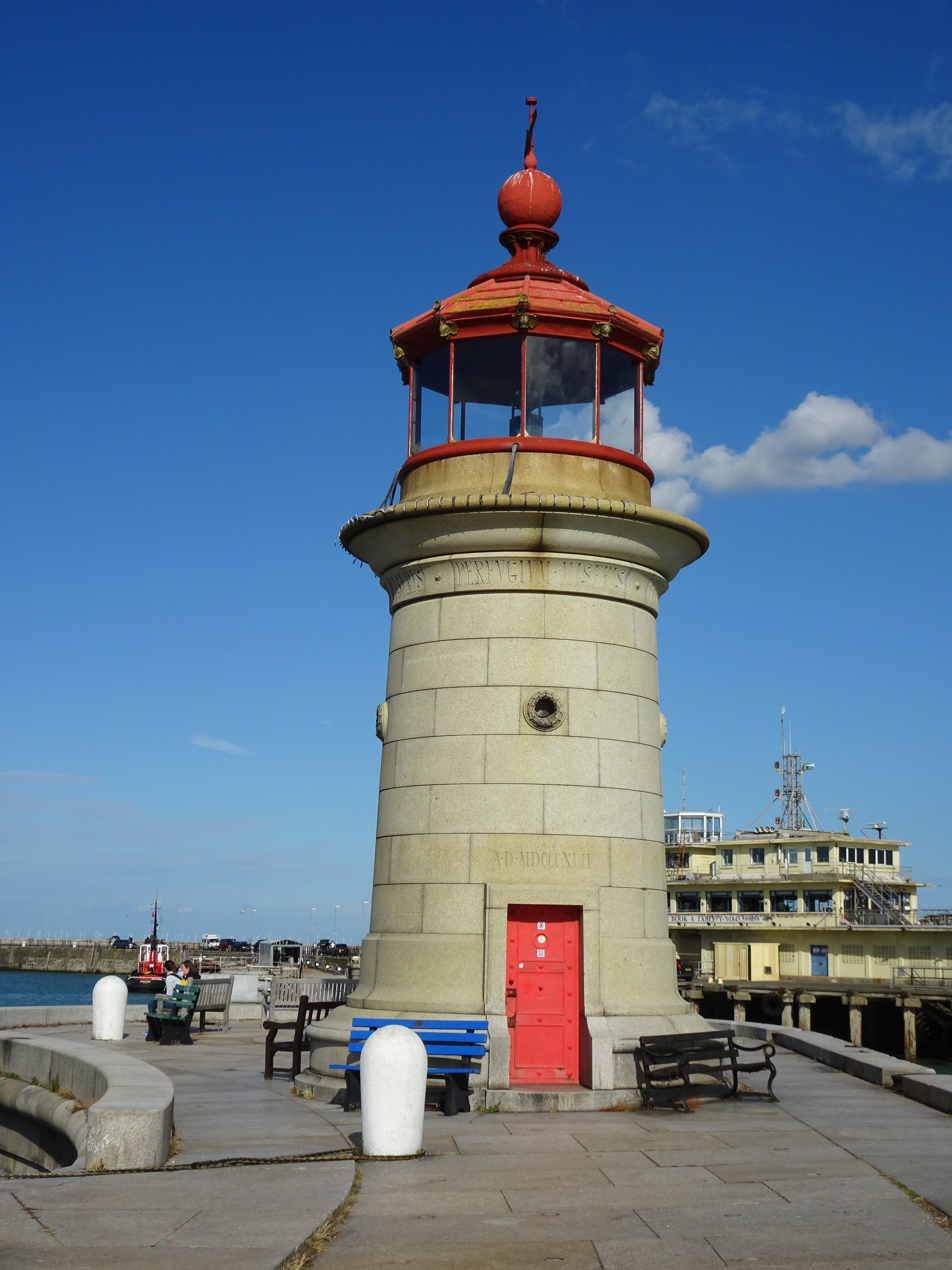
Lighthouse, Ramsgate Royal Harbour

Shaw's sister married the architect Philip Hardwick; their son Philip Charles Hardwick was also an architect. The two families lived close together in Holborn and Westminster.

== Career ==
Shaw's building for the Law Life Assurance Society at 187 Fleet Street.

Shaw was appointed architect to Eton College, Berkshire where he contributed the Tudor Gothic buildings. In the same year as working for Eton (1825) Shaw developed the Chalcots estate, Chalk Farm, building semi-detached villas.

Following his father's death in 1832, Shaw took on the surveyor role at Christ's Hospital, keeping an office there. He also took over work on the church of St Dunstan-in-the-West on Fleet Street in London. It was completed between 1833 and 1834. A building next-door to the church, at 187 Fleet Street, built for the Law Life Assurance Society in 1834 is a typical example of Shaw's Jacobean style. .

Shaw was looked upon favourably by Prince Albert as an architect who could offer something different from the usual Victorian era Gothic Revival architecture. The Prince helped secure work for Shaw, including the Royal Naval School at New Cross in London (now part of Goldsmiths College) and Wellington College in Berkshire.

In 1839 he published A Letter on Ecclesiastical Architecture, as Applicable to Modern Churches, Addressed to the Right Rev. the Bishop of London. In this he advocated the use of a Norman Revival style employing exposed brick both inside and out for the construction of churches on a limited budget. Shaw followed this practice himself at Holy Trinity Gough Square (1837-8) and Christ Church, Watney Street (1840), and, with a more Italianate influence, at St Peter-in-the-Forest, Walthamstow (also 1840).

From 1844 to 1855 Shaw was one of the official referees of metropolitan buildings.
