= Philip Hardwick =

English architect (1792–1870)

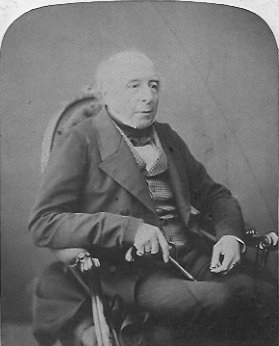
- c.1850
- Born: 15 June 1792
- Died: 28 December 1870 (aged 78)
- Occupation: Architect

Philip Hardwick RA (15 June 1792 in London – 28 December 1870) was an English architect, particularly associated with railway stations and warehouses in London and elsewhere. Hardwick is probably best known for London's demolished Euston Arch and its twin station, the original Birmingham Curzon Street, which stands today as the oldest railway terminus building in the world.

== Career ==
Hardwick was born at 9 Rathbone Place (since demolished) in Westminster, London. He was educated at Dr Barrow's school in Soho Square and trained as an architect under his father, Thomas Hardwick Jr. (1752–1829), who was in turn the son of architect Thomas Hardwick Sr. (1725–1798). The Hardwick family name spans over 150 years in the history of British architecture.

Philip Hardwick entered the Royal Academy Schools in 1808 and then studied in France and Italy from 1815 to 1819. After travelling Europe, he took over from his father as Surveyor to St Bartholomew's Hospital, London. This post later passed on to Philip's son – Philip Charles Hardwick, meaning that three successive generations of the family held the post.

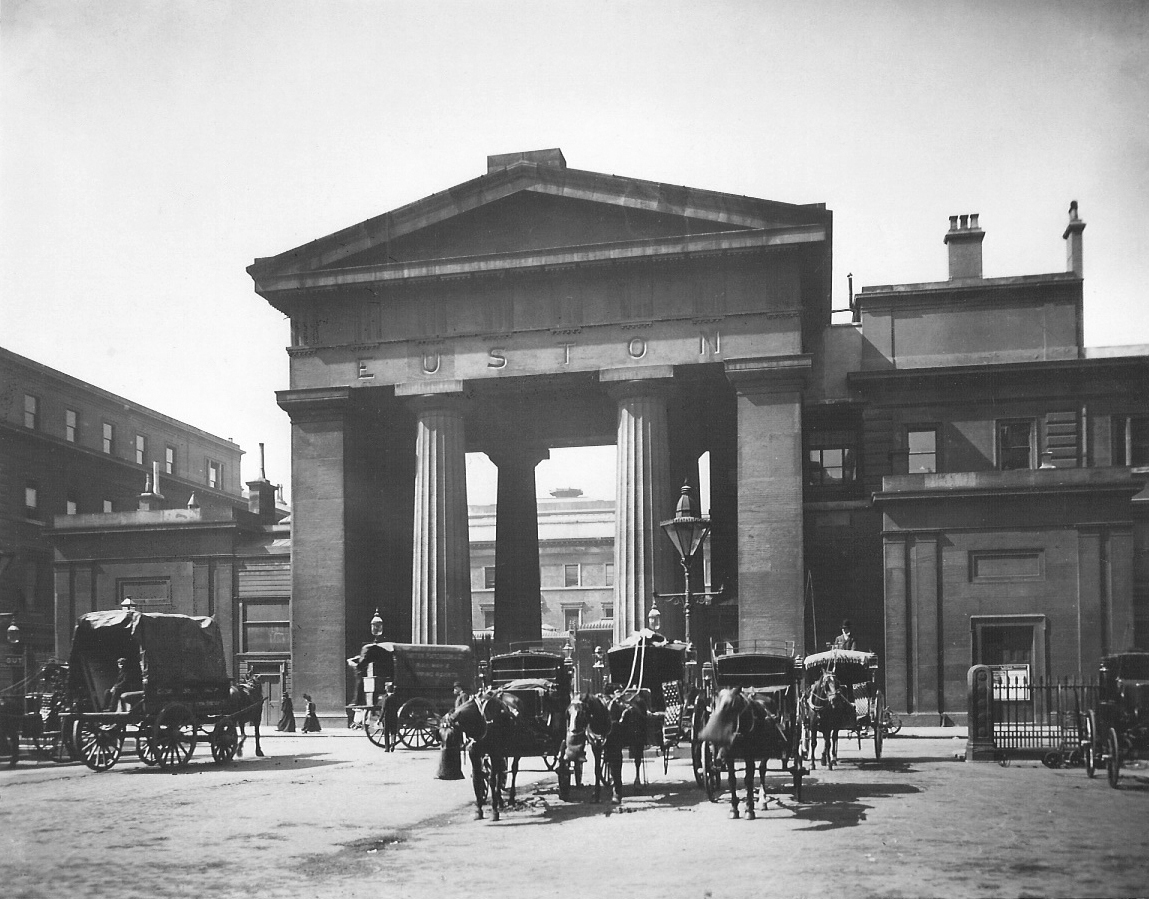
Euston Arch

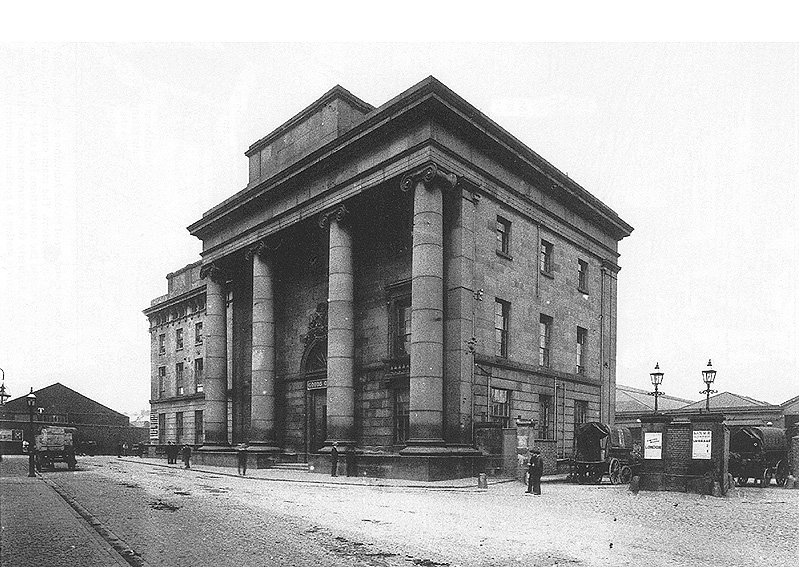
Curzon Street Station, c. 1913.

In 1825, he was appointed architect to the Saint Katharine Dock Company, for whom he designed the dock buildings, Thomas Telford designing the docks themselves. In 1829 he became architect to the Goldsmiths' Company, designing a new hall for them which was opened in 1835. In 1836, Hardwick became architect to the London and Birmingham Railway. He built a great Doric propylaeum, which became known as the "Euston Arch", as an entrance to the railway's Euston Station. In 1838 he built the Curzon Street Station as the railway's Birmingham terminus. It is an austere cubic three-story building in the Ionic style, with a portico of four giant Ionic columns.

At Babraham Hall in 1822–1823, on the site of a long-demolished sixteenth-century house, Hardwick adopted a Jacobean style, using red brick with limestone dressings. Brick was used again at Lincoln's Inn, when, in 1843–1845, Hardwick, in collaboration with his son, built a new hall and library. They used a Tudor style, the red brick varied with black brick decoration, and pale stone trim, foreshadowing the later fashion for polychrome brickwork. For churches, Hardwick used both the classical style, as at Christ Church, Cosway Street, Marylebone (1824–1825), and the Gothic, as at Holy Trinity, Bolton (1823–1825), St John's, Catford (1854), and the Royal Garrison Church, Aldershot (1863).

Hardwick gained a reputation as a surveyor and was employed by the Westminster Bridge estates, the Portman London estate, Greenwich Hospital, and the estate of the 2nd Marquess of Salisbury (1829–1835). He was also surveyor to Arthur Wellesley, 1st Duke of Wellington (from 1842), and assisted Sir Francis Smith in designing Wellington Barracks next to Buckingham Palace in 1833.

In 1831 his father in law, the architect John Shaw Senior, helped elect Hardwick as a fellow of the Royal Society. Hardwick was a founding member of the Institute of British Architects (1834) – later (1837) the RIBA – and was a member of the Institution of Civil Engineers. In 1839 he was one of the judges for the new Royal Exchange building in the City of London, and was appointed to select the design for the Oxford Museum in 1854. He was elected an associate of the Royal Academy in 1839, and became a Royal Academician in 1841.

In 1854, he received the seventh Royal Gold Medal for architecture.

== Family and pupils ==
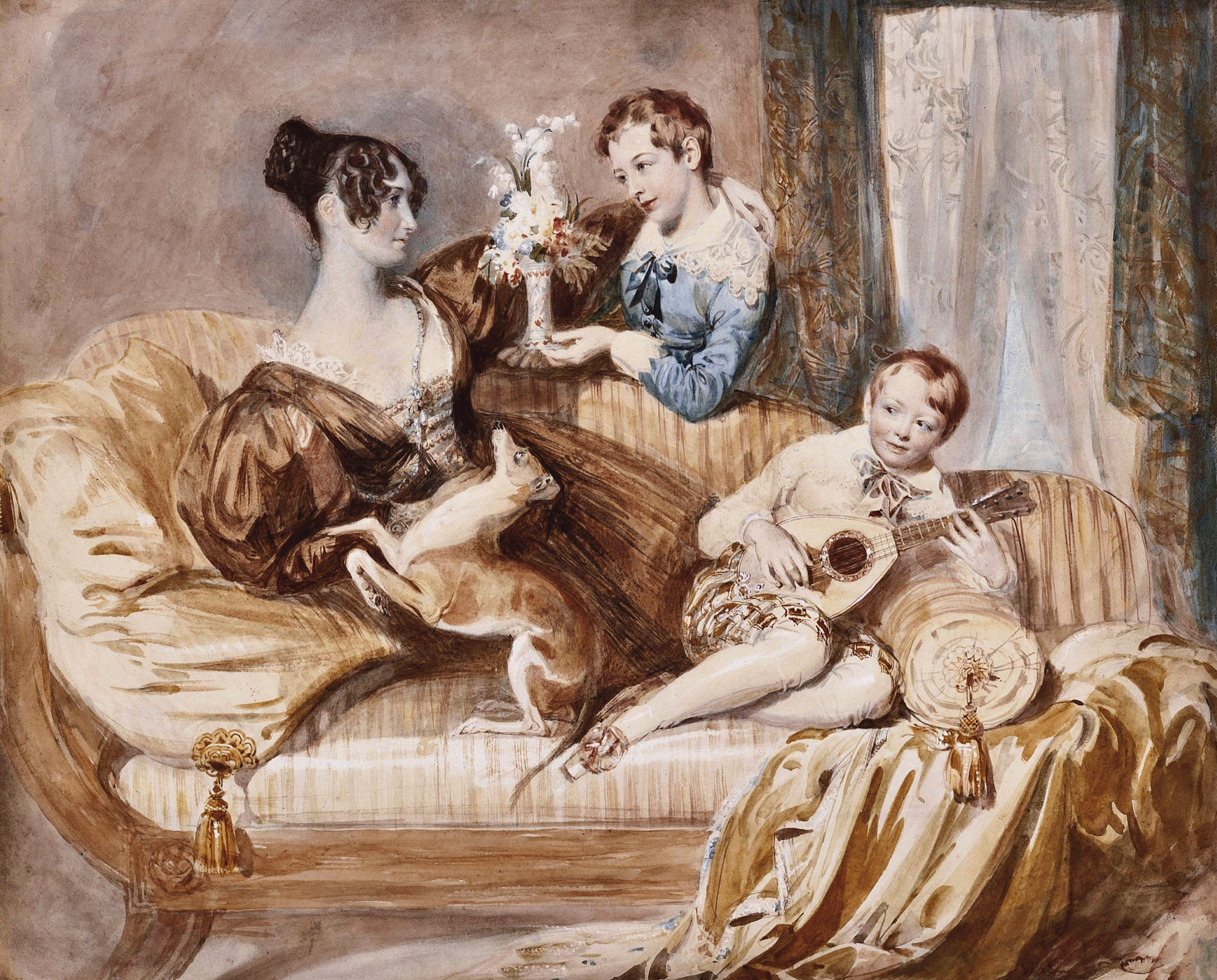
Julia Hardwick, née Shaw, with her two sons, by Daniel Maclise. Philip Charles Hardwick on the right.

Philip married Julia Shaw in 1819, at St James's Church, Piccadilly. Julia's father, John Shaw Sr. (1776–1832), and brother, John Shaw Jr. (1803–1870), were both architects. The two families lived close by within the boroughs of Westminster and Holborn. Philip Hardwick had two sons, the eldest died of smallpox whilst still at Eton, the younger, Philip Charles Hardwick, was born in 1822 and trained as an architect under him. Philip Charles began working in the firm around 1843.

Philip Hardwick's pupils included John Loughborough Pearson, Gothic Revival architect of Truro Cathedral, Thomas Henry Wyatt (1807–1880), T. Roger Smith (1830–1903), and Charles Locke Eastlake (1836–1906).

Hardwick was a close friend of the artist J. M. W. Turner (1775–1851), who had been a pupil of his father. In 1851 Turner chose Hardwick as an executor to his will.

Hardwick and much of his extended family were buried at Kensal Green Cemetery.

== Euston Arch ==
Hardwick's best-known work is likely the 1837 'Propylaeum' or Doric Euston Arch at the old Euston station, designed for the London and Birmingham Railway at the cost of £35,000. Like Inigo Jones some 200 years earlier, Hardwick had been inspired by Italian architecture, following a trip to Italy in 1818–1819.

Despite the efforts of John Betjeman and other conservationists, the Euston Arch was demolished in the early 1960s. The gates of the arch are stored at the National Railway Museum in York. In 1994, the historian Dan Cruickshank discovered 4,000 tons, or about 60%, of the arch's stones buried in the bed of the River Lea in the East End of London, including the architrave stones with the gilded EUSTON lettering. This discovery has opened the possibility of a reconstruction of the arch.

== Other projects ==
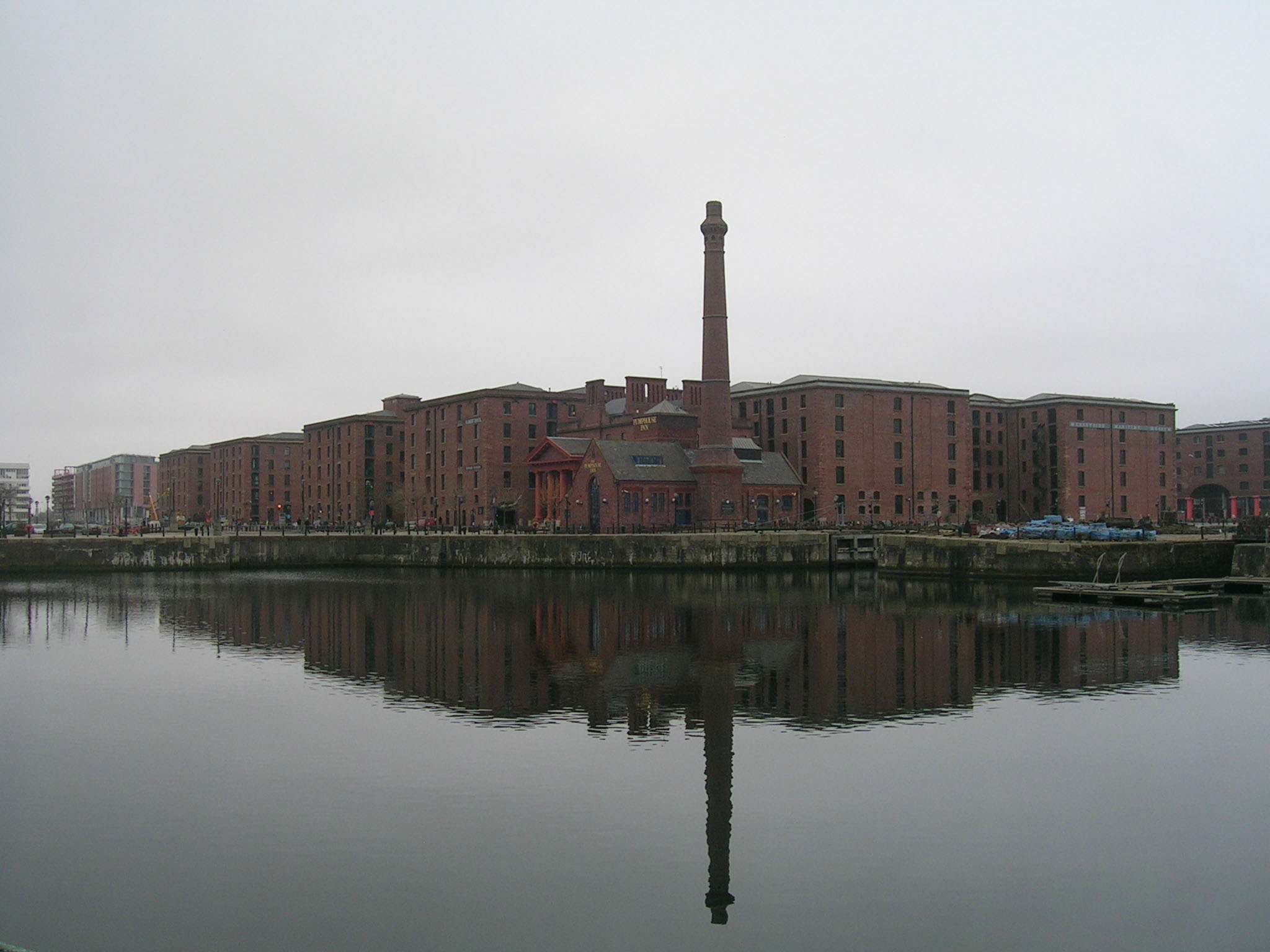
Warehouses at the Albert Dock, Liverpool

- Charterhouse School, circa 1872
- Extensions to Kneller Hall in Twickenham, circa 1820
- Christ Church, Marylebone.
- St Clement's, King Square, Finsbury, 1824
- Warehouses at St Katharine Docks (main docks scheme designed by Thomas Telford), 1827–1828
- The third Goldsmiths' Hall, 1829–1835
- The roof of St Michael and All Angels' Church, Houghton-le-Spring, Durham
- The City of London Club, another building notable for its Italian Palladian style, 1833–1834
- Sefton House mansion, Belgrave Square, now the Royal College of Defence Studies, 1842
- The Great Hall at Lincoln's Inn and a new addition to the Stone Buildings, assisted by his son and John Loughborough Pearson at the cost of over £55,000, 1843–1845
- Warehouses at the Albert Dock, with dock engineer Jesse Hartley, Liverpool, now part of the former UNESCO World Heritage Site Liverpool Maritime Mercantile City, 1846–1847
- King William Naval Asylum, now known as the Queen Adelaide Almshouses, St. John's Road, Penge (founded 1847), built 1848 to his designs at the request and expense of Queen Adelaide of Saxe-Meiningen, the widow of King William IV, to provide shelter for twelve widows or orphan daughters of naval officers. Now private residences.
- The Royal Freemasons' School for Girls, Wandsworth, 1851
- Restoration of St Anne's Limehouse, 1851–1854
- Church of St John, St John's Vale, Catford, 1854. Decorated Gothic style.
- Obelisk memorial to explorer Joseph René Bellot, Greenwich, 1855
- All Saints Church, Haggerston, Hackney, 1856
- Riding school and stables at the Hyde Park Barracks, London, 1857 (razed)
