= Shephall Manor =

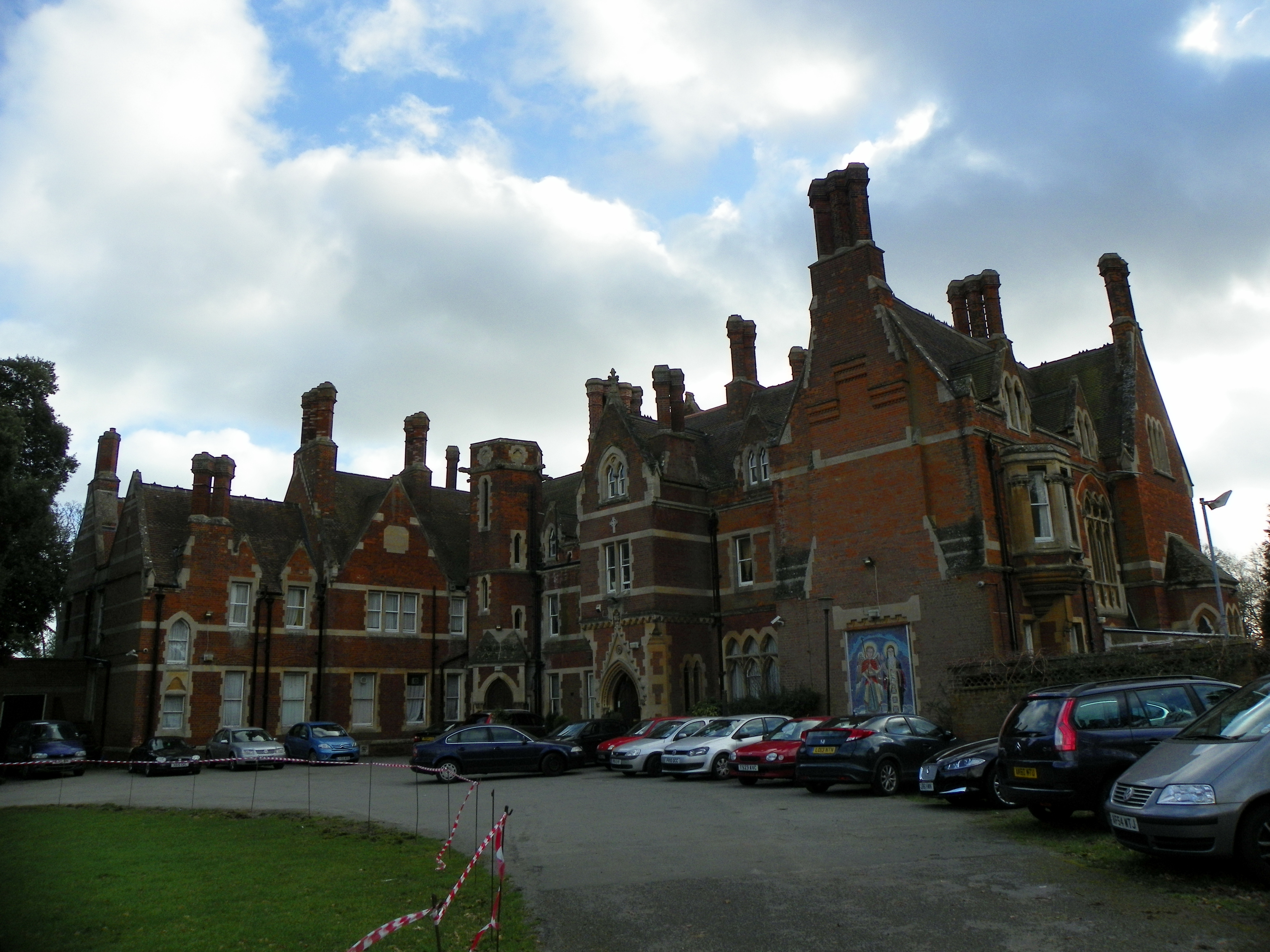
- The house in 2014
- Interactive map of the Shephall Manor area
- Alternative names: Shephalbury Manor

General information
- Architectural style: Neo-gothic
- Location: Stevenage, England
- Coordinates: 51.8861°N 0.1799°W
- Current tenants: Coptic Orthodox Church
- Completed: 1864

Design and construction
- Architect: T. Roger Smith

Shephall Manor, also known as Shephalbury Manor, is a Grade II listed building in Stevenage, a town in Hertfordshire, England.

The house was designed by T. Roger Smith in the neo-Gothic style, and was completed in 1864. The house was built for Unwin Unwin Heathcote, who had inherited the manor of Shephall in 1862 from his father, Samuel Heathcote Unwin Heathcote. Unwin Unwin Heathcote had had the previous manor house demolished, which had passed through the Nodes family between 1542 and 1761, before being split between three daughters and part of it sold to Michael Heathcote of London, who passed his share to his grandson Samuel Unwin in 1818, who then purchased the remainder and changed his name to Samuel Heathcote Unwin Heathcote. The original, small manor house was known as Shephalbury Manor and had twelve rooms and domestic offices. When the old house was demolished, a rose garden was planted on the site.

After Unwin Unwin Heathcote died in 1893, Colonel Alfred Unwin Heathcote was the last of the family to live at the manor. After his death in 1912, the house was let to Colonel Woods, then to David Augustus Bevan in 1926 and Lieutenant Colonel Morgan Grenville Gavin in 1937. The Heathcotes remained the Lords of the Manor until 1939 when the manor was sold by Michael Heathcote to William Harriman Moss. During the Second World War, the house was used to house children who had been evacuated there by the Waifs and Strays society. When they left, it became a convalescent home for Polish officers, and then a school for Polish children. In September 1947, Shephall Manor was commandeered by the Stevenage Development Corporation, who leased it to the Inner London Education Authority. The grounds were then opened for public recreation.

After the New Towns Act 1981, Shephall Manor and most of its land was owned by the New Towns Commission, and the rest was already owned by Hertfordshire County Council. The Inner London Education Authority was disbanded so the Manor was no longer required as a school. The Shephalbury Manor Action Committee was formed to save the site from development, as the Manor was not listed and the trees were not subject to preservation orders. Their campaign was successful, and in November 1988, it was listed under the Town and Country Planning Act 1971 as a building of special architectural and historic interest and achieved Grade II listed status on 17 May 1989. The house was bought by the Coptic Orthodox Church and the grounds were opened to the public as one of Stevenage's district parks. The chapel of Archangel Michael and Saint Anthony inside the house served as main parish church for 15 years until the Coptic Orthodox Cathedral of Saint George was built adjacent to the house.
