= Wanstead Hospital =

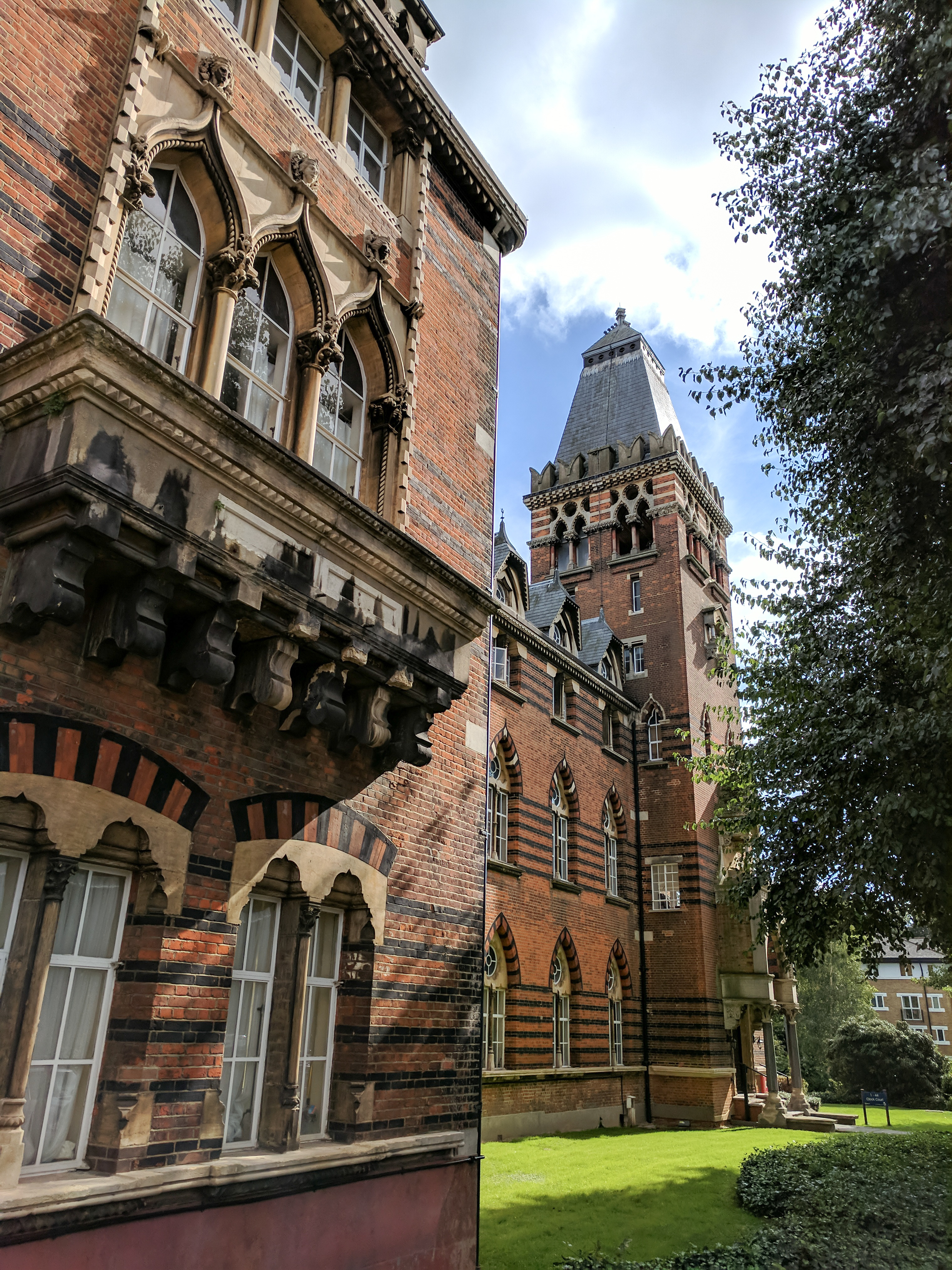
- Wanstead Hospital

- Location within Redbridge

Geography
- Location: London, United Kingdom
- Coordinates: 51.5845°N 0.0264°E

Organisation
- Care system: NHS England

Services
- Emergency department: No

History
- Founded: 1938
- Closed: 1986

Wanstead Hospital was a former NHS hospital situated on Hermon Hill in Snaresbrook, near Wanstead, in the London Borough of Redbridge.

== History ==
The building was originally constructed to accommodate the Merchant Seamen's Orphan Asylum and was opened by Prince Albert in 1861. A chapel was added in 1863. The orphans moved to Bearwood House in Wokingham and the orphan asylum became a convent in 1921. The building was taken over by Essex County Council and converted to use as a hospital in 1938. It joined the National Health Service in 1948 but, after services were transferred to Whipps Cross Hospital, closed in 1986.

The majority of the building was gutted internally and converted into apartments. The hospital's old chapel lay empty until 1995, when it was purchased by what was then the Buckhurst Hill Reform Synagogue. The building was refurbished to a high standard and is now the Sukkat Shalom Reform Synagogue.

The exterior of the hospital was used for the opening credits of the Doctor in the House comedy series produced by London Weekend Television from 1969.

== See also ==
- Healthcare in London
- List of hospitals in England
