= St Mary the Virgin, Wanstead =

Historic church in Wanstead, London

Coordinates: 51.5713°N 0.0326°E

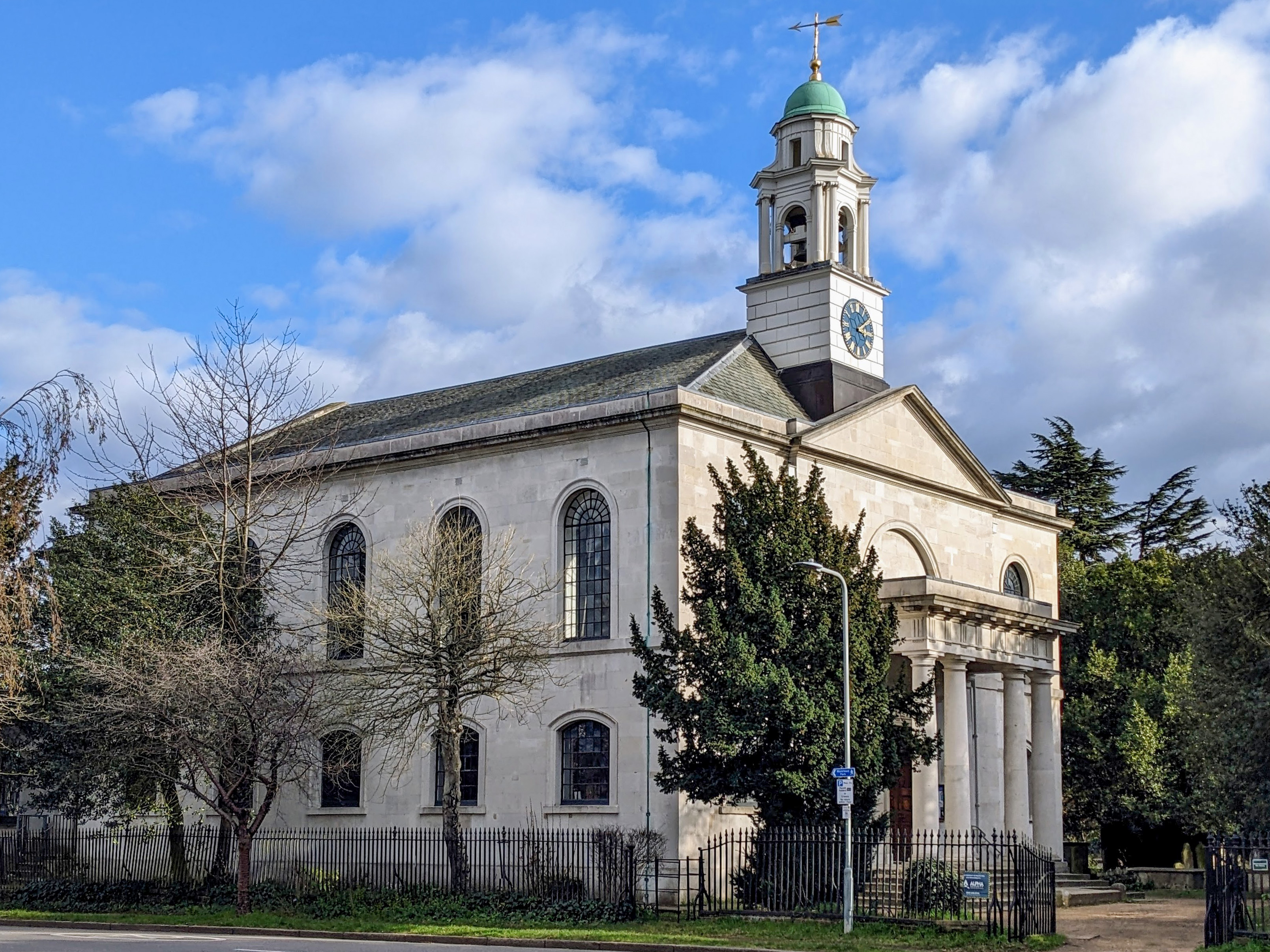
St Mary the Virgin church

St Mary the Virgin, Wanstead is a Church of England church in Wanstead, east London. It is located on Overton Drive and now shares its parish with Christ Church, Wanstead. It is the only Grade I listed building in the London Borough of Redbridge.

The parish is first recorded in 1208, but its medieval church was replaced 70 foot to the north by the present building between 1787 and 1790, on a plot donated from his estate by James Tylney-Long. It was designed by architect Thomas Hardwick. Its foundation stone was laid on 13 July 1787, followed by a reception at Wanstead House, and it was completed on 24 June 1790, with a consecration ceremony led by Beilby Porteus, bishop of London. After the new church was completed, its medieval predecessor was demolished, though the latter's large monument to Josiah Child was moved to the new church.

The sculptor Joseph Wilton and the Royal Navy Vice-Admiral Robert Plampin are buried in the churchyard.
