= Christ Church, Wanstead =

Church in Wanstead, London Borough of Redbridge, United Kingdom

Coordinates: 51.5776°N 0.0245°E

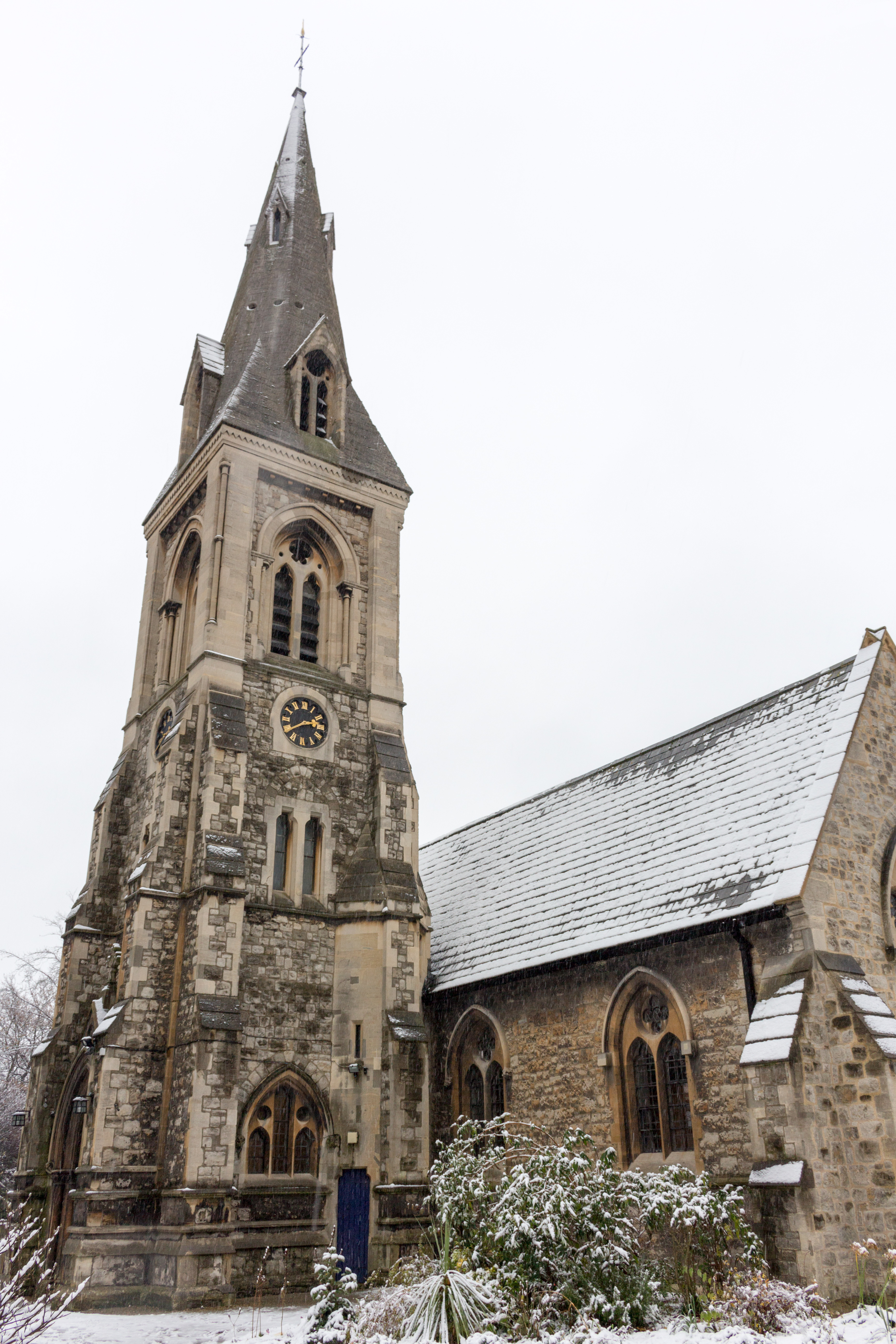
Christ Church, Wanstead

Christ Church is a Church of England church in Wanstead, east London. It was built as a chapel of ease to St Mary the Virgin, whose parish it still shares, to meet population expansion in the Snaresbrook area caused by the railway boom.

Built at the height of the Gothic revival, its architecture is the geometric style of the late 13th century. It was designed by George Gilbert Scott, who also designed the nearby Infant Orphan Asylum, now Snaresbrook Crown Court. The foundation stone was laid on 18 May 1860 by Joseph Wigram (Bishop of Rochester and brother of William Pitt Wigram, then rector of Wanstead) and it was consecrated on 19 July 1861 by Archibald Tait, Bishop of London. An extra bay was added to the nave's original four in 1867, along with a south aisle to match the original north aisle. Two years later a tower and spire followed, though the vestries were only added in 1889.
