= Sukkat Shalom Reform Synagogue =

Reform synagogue in Wanstead, London, England

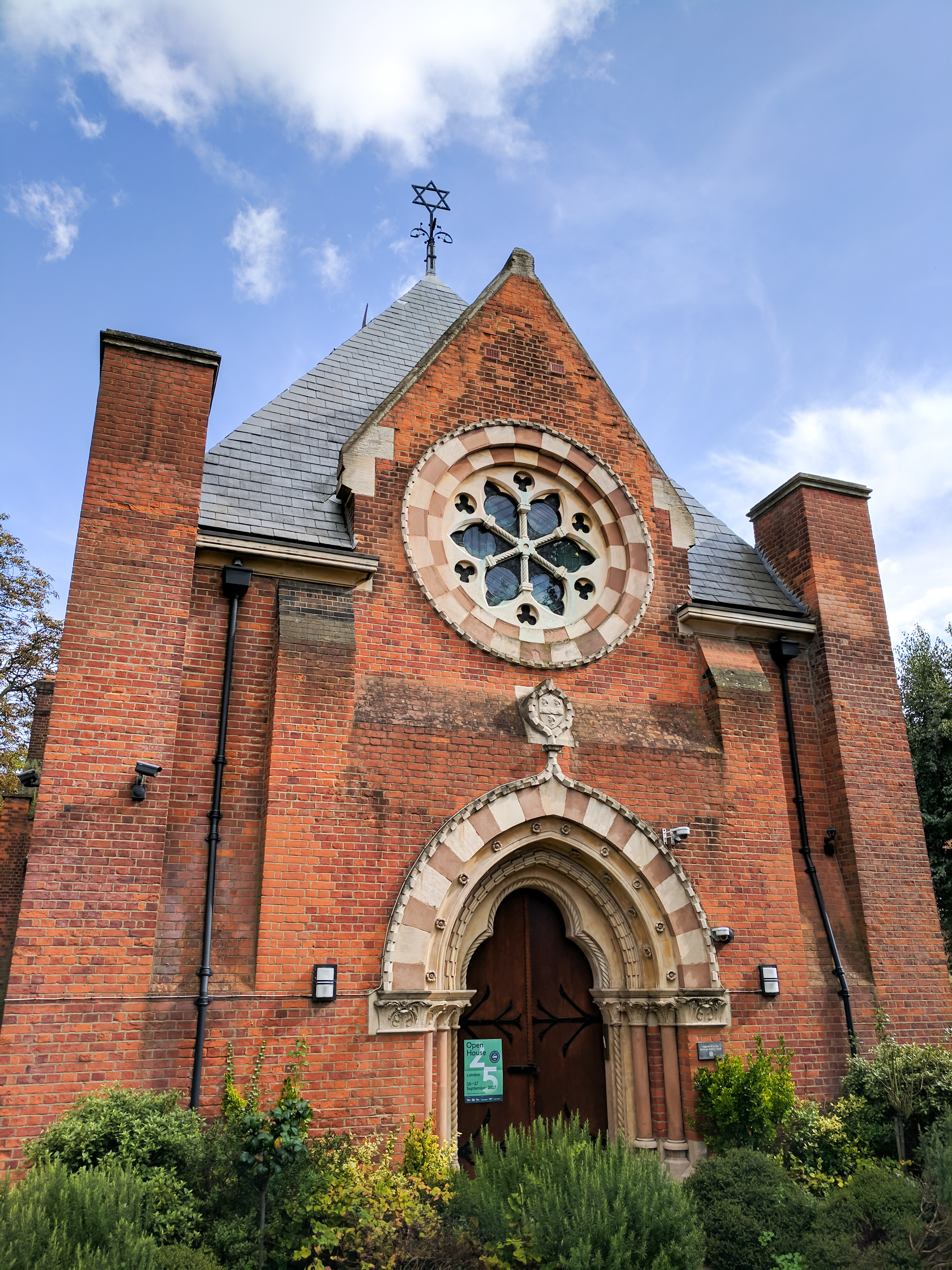
- The synagogue in 2017

- Location of the synagogue in Greater London

Religion
- Affiliation: Reform Judaism
- Ecclesiastical or organisational status: Synagogue
- Leadership: Rabbi Tali Artman Partock
- Status: Active

Location
- Location: 1 Victory Road, Hermon Hill, Wanstead, London, England E11 1Ul
- Country: United Kingdom
- Coordinates: 51°35′06″N 0°01′35″E

Architecture
- Type: Orphanage; chapel
- Established: 1981 (as a congregation)
- Completed: 1861 (as an orphanage); 1995 (as a synagogue)
- Materials: Red brick

Website
- sukkatshalom.org.uk

Listed Building – Grade II*
- Official name: Former Merchant Seamen's Orphan Asylum at Wanstead Hospital and chapel to the north west of Wanstead Hospital
- Type: Listed building
- Designated: 22 February 1979
- Reference no.: 1200737

Sukkat Shalom Reform Synagogue (transliterated from Hebrew as "Shelter of Peace") is a Reform Jewish congregation and synagogue, located in Wanstead, in the Borough of Redbridge, London, England, in the United Kingdom.

The congregation is a member of the Movement for Reform Judaism. The rabbi of the congregation, since 2021, is Rabbi Tali Artman Partock.

== History ==
The congregation was established in 1981 as the Epping Forest & District Reform Synagogue. In c. 1985, the congregation changed its name to the Buckhurst Hill Reform Synagogue; with a further name change to Sukkat Shalom Reform Synagogue in 1996.

Located in Bedford House, Buckhurst Hill, Essex from 1981 to 1995, the congregation acquired its current location in 1995 and subsequently renovated and restored the building as a synagogue. The site occupied by the synagogue is in the restored chapel of Wanstead Hospital, and previously the Merchant Seamen's Orphan's Asylum. The site was Grade II* listed with English Heritage in 1979.

== Beliefs ==
=== Marriage ===
The synagogue has an inclusive vision and celebrates both opposite-sex marriages and same-sex marriages.

== See also ==
- History of the Jews in England
- List of Jewish communities in the United Kingdom
- List of synagogues in the United Kingdom
