= Hardwicke (surname) =

Hardwicke is a surname. Notable people with the surname include:

- Catherine Hardwicke (born 1955), American film director
- Cedric Hardwicke (1893–1964), English actor
- Éanna Hardwicke (born 1996), Irish actor and filmmaker
- Edward Hardwicke (1932–2011), English actor, son of Cedric
- John W. Hardwicke (1927–2009), American politician and judge
- Robert Hardwicke (1822–1875), British publisher
- Thomas Hardwicke (1756–1835), British soldier and naturalist

Fictional characters:

- Gillian Hardwicke, a fictional ADA appearing in Law & Order: Special Victims Unit

== See also ==
- Hardwick (surname)
- Hardwicke (disambiguation)
