= John Shaw Sr. =

English architect

John Shaw Sr. FRS FSA (1776–1832) was an English architect. He was architect to Christ's Hospital in London, and to the Port of Ramsgate. Many of his works, including the church of St Dunstan-in-the-West in Fleet Street, London, were in a Gothic Revival style.

== Early life and career ==
Shaw was born in Bexley, Kent in 1776. His father, also named John Shaw, was a surgeon, and his mother, Elizabeth Latham, was from a wealthy landowning family. He moved to Southwark, Surrey and trained under the architect George Gwilt the elder. It is thought that Shaw and Gwilt were related as Gwilt had married a Sarah Shaw, and it is quite possible that the two architects were cousins.

In 1799 Shaw married a cousin, Elizabeth Hester Whitfield, who was from a missionary family, at St George's, Hanover Square, in London

== Architectural works ==
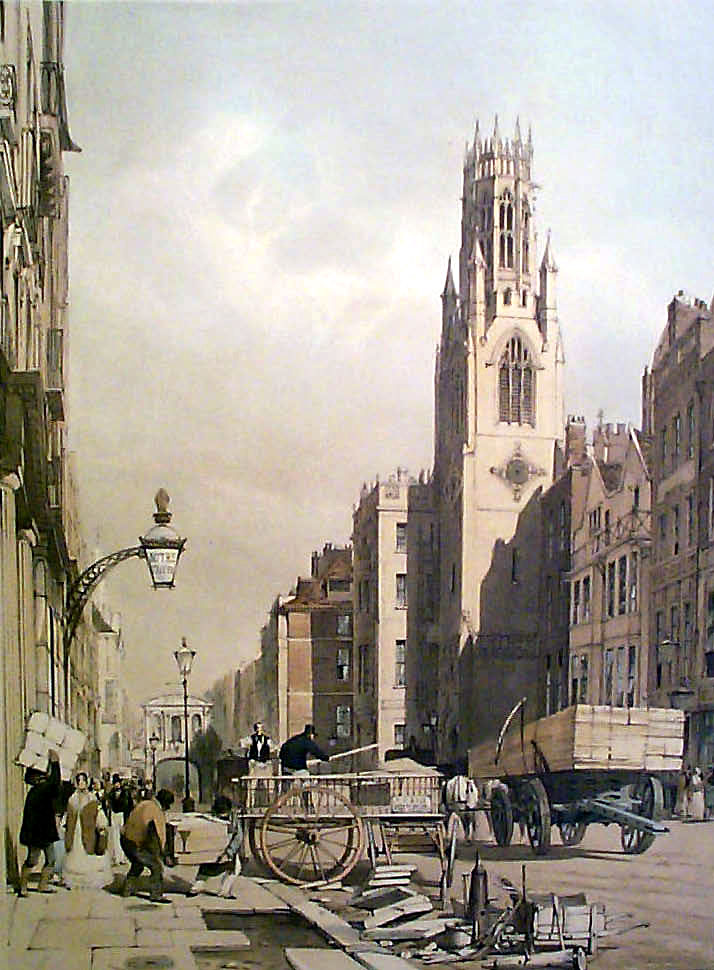
St Dunstan-in-the-West in 1842

=== Gothic mansions ===
Shaw worked with Humphrey Repton, remodelling Lord Uxbridge's property at Beaudesert, and was later employed to redesign parts of Newstead Abbey in Nottinghamshire by Colonel Thomas Wildman who had just bought the estate from Lord Byron. Between 1821 and 1826 he rebuilt Ilam Hall in Staffordshire in the Gothic style for the manufacturer Jesse Watts Russell.

=== Christ's Hospital ===
In 1816 Shaw was appointed architect to Christ's Hospital school, then sited in Newgate Street in the City of London. In 1825 the governors of the school asked him to build a new great hall for the school. He employed a gothic style, with buttresses, battlements and pinnacles, designing a large rectangular building, with octagonal towers housing staircases at either end. The Great Hall itself, 187 feet (57 m) long, was on the upper floor, lit by nine large windows filling the spaces between the buttresses. Various other functions were housed in ground floor and basement. Along the front of the ground floor, facing Newgate Street, was an open granite arcade 200 feet (61 m) long, built of granite. The upper parts of this frontage were of Portland stone, while the rest of the building was brick. Charles Locke Eastlake commented

Neither in the basement nor in any part of the building which is out of public sight were any pains taken to preserve a structural consistency of design. The Gothic of that day was, it must be confessed, little better than a respectable deception. It put a good face on its principal elevations, but left underground offices and back premises to take care of themselves.

Shaw also built school's infirmary (1822), and the "New Schools", a block in a Tudor style, in yellow brick with stone facings. This had a covered cloister running along the front, and staircases at each end of the building housed in rectangular projections surmounted by pinnacles and domes. All these buildings were demolished when the site was cleared for new buildings for the General Post Office, following the school's removal to Horsham in 1902.

=== Ramsgate ===
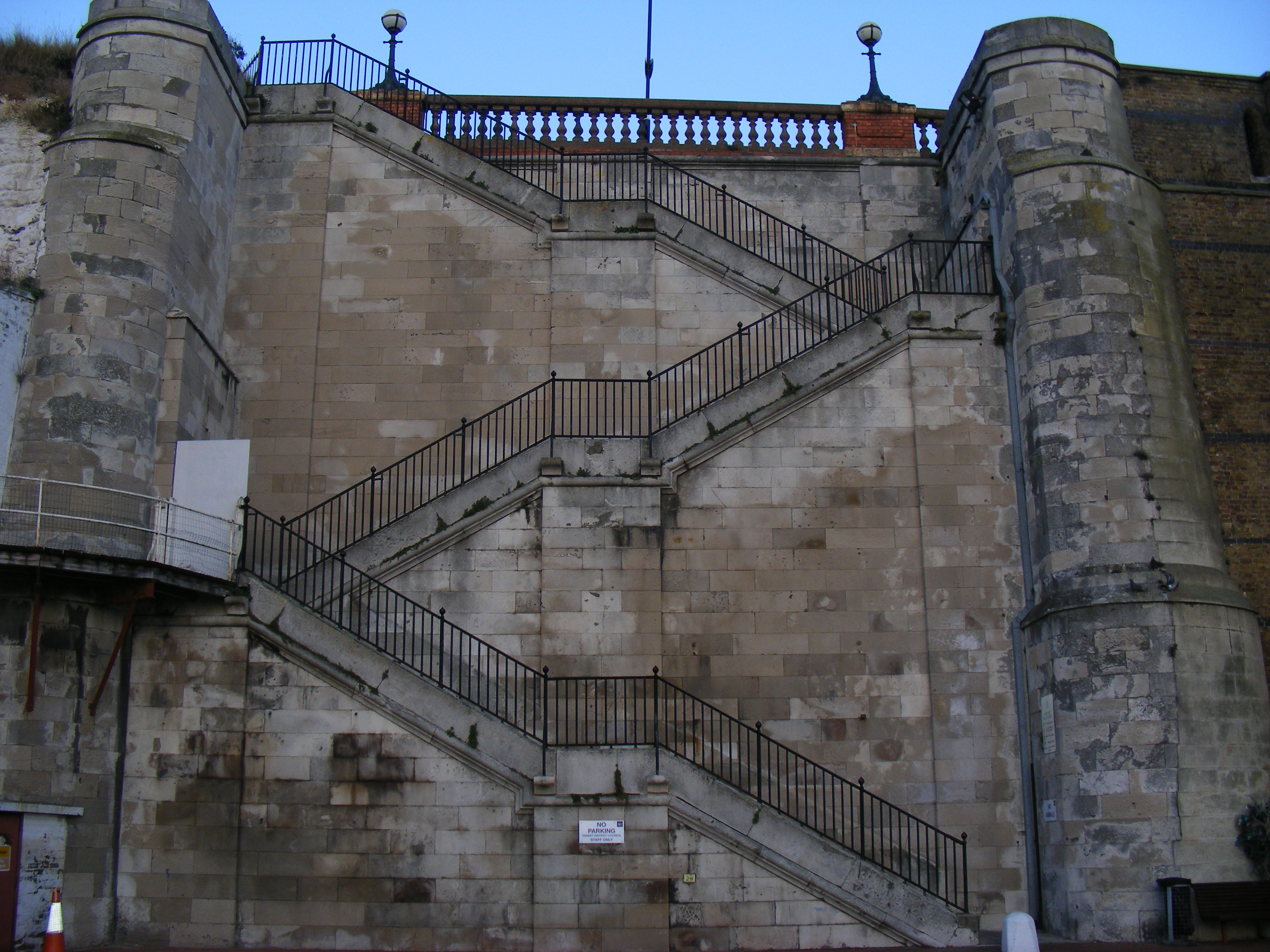
Jacob's Ladder, Ramsgate

As architect to Ramsgate Harbour in Kent he designed the clock house, the Jacob's Ladder stairway and an obelisk commemorating King George IV passing through the port on a journey to Hanover.

=== St Dunstan-in-the-West ===
Shaw's last work, considered his masterpiece, is the church of St Dunstan-in-the-West on Fleet Street in the City of London. It is suggested that he based the tower on St Helen's in York although the tower more closely resembles that of St Botolph’s Church in Boston, Lincolnshire (known as the Boston Stump) and designed an unusual octagonal tower in the gothic style. Shaw died in 1832 before the church was finished and left the remaining work to his son, John Shaw Jr., whom he had trained at his office in Christ's Hospital.

The Shaws were pioneers in the development of semi-detached housing in London, breaking away from the common design of terraced housing.

== Societies and exhibitions ==
Shaw was a member of the Architects' Club and a Fellow of the Royal Society, the Linnean Society of London and the Society of Antiquaries of London.

Shaw exhibited at the Royal Academy between 1799 and 1834, showing landscapes as well as designs for buildings.

== Death ==
Shaw died suddenly at Ramsgate in July 1832, aged 56. His son John Shaw Jr., born 1803, took over his posts as architect at Christ's Hospital and Ramsgate, as well as finishing St Dunstan's.

== Family ==
Shaw's most famous son was John Shaw Jr., born 1803, who also became an architect. Another son was Thomas Budd Shaw, who became tutor of English literature to the grand dukes of Russia in St Petersburg. His daughter, Julia Shaw, married the eminent London architect Philip Hardwick, whom Shaw had helped elect into the Royal Society in 1831. The Shaws and Hardwicks often lived close by each other in Westminster and Holborn.

Shaw Senior is buried at St Mary's Church in Bexley. His portrait was painted by Abraham Daniel (1760–1806) and is part of the National Portrait Gallery collection as well as having a portrait hung at the church of St Dunstan-in-the-West.
