= Thomas Roger Smith =

English architect and academic (1830–1903)

Thomas Roger Smith (1830–1903) was an English architect and academic. He is now best known for his views and writings on public buildings, in terms of their style and acoustics, and their influence on other architects, particularly in relation to British imperial architecture.

== Life ==
Born at Sheffield on 14 July 1830, he was the only son of the Rev. Thomas Smith of Sheffield by his wife Louisa Thomas of Chelsea. After private education he entered the office of Philip Hardwick; and spent a year and a half in travel before beginning independent practice as an architect in 1855. Arthur John Gale was in partnership with him until 1891 and from 1888 his son, Ravenscroft Elsey Smith. His office was at Temple Chambers, Temple Avenue, E.C., London. An employee was the novelist Thomas Hardy, for a few months in 1872 as he was struggling to establish himself as a writer.

Smith lectured on architecture and became in 1851 a member of the Architectural Association, of which he was president in 1860–1 and again in 1863–4. At the Royal Institute of British Architects (RIBA) he was elected an associate in 1856, in 1863 a fellow, and was for several sessions a member of its council. In 1869 he was a founding editor of The Architect.

Smith became chairman in 1899 of the statutory board of examiners (under the London Building Acts) which the Institute appointed. In 1874 he was made district surveyor under the Metropolitan Board of Works for Southwark and North Lambeth and was transferred in 1882 to the district of West Wandsworth. Smith's other official appointments were numerous. At the Carpenters' Company, he attained in 1901 the office of master. He was an examiner in architecture to the Science and Art Department, South Kensington Museum, as well as to the City and Guilds Institute.

From 1880 to his death, Smith was Professorship of Architecture at University College, London, which he held from 1880 to his death. He was brought in on questions of rights of light, and as an architectural assessor in competitions. Seriously lame for many years, Smith worked on until the end of 1902. He died on 11 March 1903 at his residence, Gordon Street, Gordon Square, London.

== Indian experience and British imperial architecture ==
Selected to design exhibition buildings in Bombay, Smith went there in 1864. The project was abandoned, after the contract was signed, because of the cotton famine. Buildings were erected in India from his designs, including the post office and British Hospital at Bombay, and the residency at Ganeshkhind.

In 1873 Smith made much-noted comments on the architectural styles appropriate to the British Empire and its public buildings. Speaking to the Society of Arts, he urged that "European" styles should be adopted. On that occasion he was opposed by William Emerson, whose view was that "Indic" styles should be used on such buildings, in India. The debate ran on for decades. Smith had made the same case in a RIBA lecture in 1868. The topical context in which he spoke in 1873 was that (what became known as) Indo-Saracenic Revival architecture had strong proponents, in particular Lord Napier in Madras. Smith was defending the Gothic Revival style that was being introduced to Bombay. This style had the favour of Henry Bartle Frere, the governor, but was in fact a hybrid. Part of Smith's thesis denied a characteristically "English" architectural style.

== Other works ==
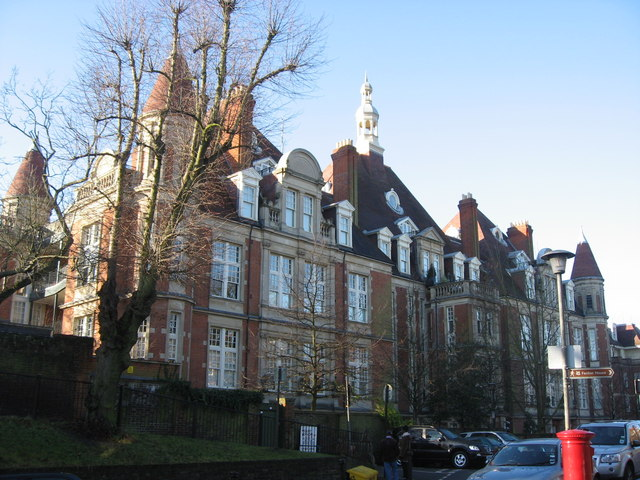
Mount Vernon, former hospital in Hampstead

In England Smith's work included the Technical Schools (and Baths) of the Carpenters' Company at Stratford, and the Ben Jonson schools at Stepney (1872), as well as other schools for the London School Board. In school design, Smith employed what was then called the "German system", or "Prussian plan", in the Jonson Street School in Stepney, providing in particular one classroom per class. Still a contentious approach, it was criticised by Edward Robert Robson, who had objections on grounds of expense. At that date, Robson as School Board architect was making a reasonable case based on the existing supply of teachers.

Smith designed also Emmanuel church and vicarage, South Croydon, and the Sanatorium at Reedham (1883). The North London Hospital for Consumption at Hampstead, known as Mount Vernon, was built in 1880, enlarged in 1892, completed 1903. Its French-influenced style was a pattern repeated in hospitals built over the next two decades. Laboratories at University College London (opened 1892) formed part of an uncompleted scheme for the Gower Street front of the large quadrangle.

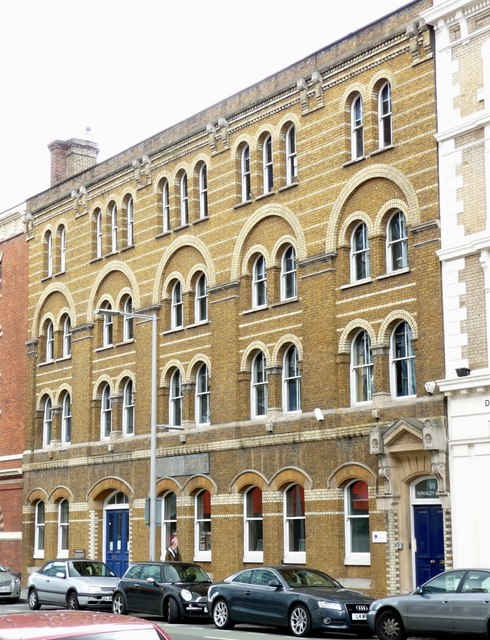
99 Southwark Street, London, 1877 building designed by Thomas Roger Smith

Domestic architectural work included Armathwaite Hall, Cumberland; Brambletye House, East Grinstead; Hitcham Hall, Hitcham, Buckinghamshire for George Hanbury, and Beechy Lees at Otford, Kent.

== Writings ==
Smith's published books were:

- A Rudimentary Treatise on the Acoustics of Public Buildings, in Weale's series (1861);
- Architecture, Classic and Early Christian (1882; new edit. 1898);
- Gothic and Renaissance Architecture (1888, Illustrated Handbooks of Art History), with John Slater (1847–1924).

== Family ==
Smith married in 1858 Catherine, daughter of Joseph Elsey of Highgate. He was survived by his widow, one daughter, and three sons, of whom Ravenscroft Elsey Smith became in 1899 professor of architecture at King's College, London.

== Notes ==
Attribution

This article incorporates text from a publication now in the public domain: Lee, Sidney, ed. (1912). "Smith, Thomas Roger". Dictionary of National Biography (2nd supplement). Vol. 3. London: Smith, Elder & Co.
