= Anna Elisabeth Hartwick =

Swedish lace industrialist (1796–1882)

Anna Elisabeth Hartwick (1796–1882) was a Swedish lace industrialist.

She lived in Vadstena, which had a long history of professional lace making. In the 18th century, individual makers of bobbin lace sold their works to peddlers, but in the 19th century, this small-scale industry developed in to a larger industry dominated by Anna Elisabeth Hartwick and her main rival Catharina Lidman (1792–1856). Hartwick bought up lace from many of the lace makers of Vadstena and had them sold through her shop and through salespersons employed by her throughout the nation. Through her employee Catharina Andersdotter, she sold lace to the queen, Louise of the Netherlands, and the Swedish court.
