= Thomas Hardwick Sr. =

English master mason and architect

Thomas Hardwick Sr. (1725–1798) was an 18th-century architect. The Hardwick name is famous in British architecture, spanning over 150 years of work. In 1760, Thomas Hardwick Sr. had become a master mason at Syon House for the brothers Robert and John Adam. His son Thomas Hardwick was also an architect.
