= Walthamstow West =

Parliamentary constituency in the United Kingdom, 1918–1974

- Former borough constituency for the House of Commons
- County: 1918–1965: Essex; 1965–1974: Greater London

1918–1974
- Created from: Walthamstow
- Replaced by: Walthamstow

Walthamstow West was a borough constituency in what is now the London Borough of Waltham Forest, but was until 1965 the Walthamstow Urban District of Essex. It returned one Member of Parliament (MP) to the House of Commons of the Parliament of the United Kingdom.

The constituency was created for the 1918 general election, and abolished for the February 1974 general election, when it was combined with part of the former Walthamstow East to form the new Walthamstow constituency.

== Boundaries ==
1918–1950: The Urban District of Walthamstow wards of High Street, Higham Hill, and St James Street.

1950–1974: The Borough of Walthamstow wards of High Street, Higham Hill, and St James Street.

== Members of Parliament ==
Election	Member	Party	Notes
1918	Charles Jesson	National Democratic	
Jan 1922	Charles Jesson	National Liberal	
Nov 1922	Valentine McEntee	Labour	
1924	Horace Crawfurd	Liberal	
1929	Valentine McEntee	Labour	
1950	Clement Attlee	Labour	Member for Limehouse (1922–1950); Prime Minister of the United Kingdom (1945–1951); Leader of the Opposition (1951–1955); Elevated to the peerage on 16 December 1955
1956 by-election	Edward Redhead	Labour	Died 15 April 1967
1967 by-election	Fred Silvester	Conservative	
1970	Eric Deakins	Labour	Contested Walthamstow following redistribution
Feb 1974	constituency abolished		

== Election results ==
=== Elections in the 1910s ===
General election 1918: Walthamstow West
Party		Candidate	Votes	%
C	National Democratic	Charles Jesson	7,330	51.6
	Labour	Valentine McEntee	4,167	29.3
	Liberal	Emslie Horniman	2,707	19.1
Majority			3,163	22.3
Turnout			14,204	47.0
Registered electors				
	National Democratic win (new seat)			
C indicates candidate endorsed by the coalition government.

=== Elections in the 1920s ===
General election 1922: Walthamstow West
Party	Candidate	Votes	%	±%
Labour	Valentine McEntee	8,758	43.3	+13.9
National Liberal	Charles Jesson	6,253	30.9	–20.7
Liberal	Horace Crawfurd	5,228	25.8	+6.8
Majority		2,505	12.4	N/A
Turnout		20,239	63.8	+16.8
Registered electors				
Labour gain from National Liberal		Swing	+17.3	

General election 1923: Walthamstow West
Party	Candidate	Votes	%	±%
Labour	Valentine McEntee	10,026	47.6	+4.3
Liberal	Horace Crawfurd	8,234	39.0	+13.2
Unionist	Jabeez Lyne	2,832	13.4	New
Majority		1,792	8.6	−3.8
Turnout		21,092	65.5	+1.7
Registered electors				
Labour hold		Swing	-4.5	

General election 1924: Walthamstow West
Party	Candidate	Votes	%	±%
Liberal	Horace Crawfurd	12,991	50.9	+21.9
Labour	Valentine McEntee	12,521	49.1	+1.5
Majority		470	1.8	−6.8
Turnout		25,512	75.5	+10.0
Registered electors				
Liberal gain from Labour		Swing		

General election 1929: Walthamstow West
Party	Candidate	Votes	%	±%
Labour	Valentine McEntee	16,050	54.0	−4.9
Liberal	Horace Crawfurd	9,470	31.9	−18.0
Unionist	Frederick C Bramston	4,184	14.1	New
Majority		6,580	22.1	N/A
Turnout		29,704	73.3	−2.2
Registered electors				
Labour gain from Liberal		Swing	+7.0	

=== Elections in the 1930s ===
General election 1931: Walthamstow West
Party	Candidate	Votes	%	±%
Labour	Valentine McEntee	14,144	45.14	
Conservative	Claude Herbert Grundy	13,137	41.93	
Liberal	Sydney Robinson	4,053	12.93	
Majority		1,007	3.21	
Turnout		31,334	72.82	
Registered electors				
Labour hold		Swing		

General election 1935: Walthamstow West
Party	Candidate	Votes	%	±%
Labour	Valentine McEntee	17,613	61.83	
Conservative	Thomas Claude Catty	10,874	38.17	
Majority		6,739	23.66	
Turnout		28,487	64.97	
Registered electors				
Labour hold		Swing		

=== Election in the 1940s ===
General election 1945: Walthamstow West
Party	Candidate	Votes	%	±%
Labour	Valentine McEntee	17,460	65.22	+3.39
Liberal	Lancelot Spicer	4,760	17.78	New
Conservative	Leslie Charles Curran	4,550	17.00	−21.17
Majority		12,700	47.44	
Turnout		26,770	70.14	
Registered electors				
Labour hold		Swing		

=== Elections in the 1950s ===
General election 1950: Walthamstow West
Party	Candidate	Votes	%	±%
Labour	Clement Attlee	21,095	60.46	–4.76
Conservative	John Arthur Paul	8,988	25.76	+8.76
Liberal	Alan Whitfield Pim	4,102	11.76	–6.02
Labour Independent Group	Lester Hutchinson	704	2.02	New
Majority		12,107	34.70	
Turnout		34,889		
Registered electors				
Labour hold		Swing	-6.76	

General election 1951: Walthamstow West
Party	Candidate	Votes	%	±%
Labour	Clement Attlee	23,021	66.79	+6.33
Conservative	Edward du Cann	11,447	33.21	+7.15
Majority		11,574	33.58	−1.12
Turnout		34,468	81.94	
Registered electors				
Labour hold		Swing	-0.41	

General election 1955: Walthamstow West
Party	Candidate	Votes	%	±%
Labour	Clement Attlee	19,327	65.73	−1.06
Conservative	Richard Hornby	10,077	34.27	+1.06
Majority		9,250	31.46	−2.12
Turnout		29,404	72.48	−9.46
Registered electors				
Labour hold		Swing	-1.06	

1956 Walthamstow West by-election
Party	Candidate	Votes	%	±%
Labour	Edward Redhead	13,388	64.68	−1.05
Conservative	Richard Hornby	4,184	20.21	−14.06
Liberal	Oliver Smedley	3,037	14.67	New
Independent	Bill Boaks	89	0.43	New
Majority		9,204	44.47	+13.01
Turnout		20,698		
Registered electors				
Labour hold		Swing		

General election 1959: Walthamstow West
Party	Candidate	Votes	%	±%
Labour	Edward Redhead	15,980	54.95	
Conservative	Harry Midgley	7,872	27.07	
Liberal	Oliver Smedley	5,229	17.98	
Majority		8,108	27.88	
Turnout		29,081	76.08	
Registered electors				
Labour hold		Swing		

=== Elections in the 1960s ===
General election 1964: Walthamstow West
Party	Candidate	Votes	%	±%
Labour	Edward Redhead	14,405	56.2	
Conservative	Edward Michael Ogden	6,780	26.5	–1.7
Liberal	Colin Allen Hart-Leverton	4,437	17.3	
Majority		7,625	29.8	
Turnout		25,622	72.2	
Registered electors				
Labour hold		Swing		

General election 1966: Walthamstow West
Party	Candidate	Votes	%	±%
Labour	Edward Redhead	14,665	61.2	+5.0
Conservative	Frederick Silvester	5,940	24.8	
Liberal	Donald W. Bramley	3,370	14.1	
Majority		8,725	36.4	
Turnout		23,975	71.0	
Registered electors				
Labour hold		Swing		

By-election 1967: Walthamstow West
Party	Candidate	Votes	%	±%
Conservative	Frederick Silvester	6,652	37.1	+12.3
Labour	Eric Deakins	6,590	36.7	―24.5
Liberal	Margaret Wingfield	4,105	22.9	+8.8
Anti-Common Market	Oliver Smedley	542	3.0	New
Independent	Robin Allen	63	0.4	New
Majority		62	0.3	N/A
Turnout		17,952		
Registered electors				
Conservative gain from Labour		Swing		

=== Election in the 1970s ===
General election 1970: Walthamstow West
Party	Candidate	Votes	%	±%
Labour	Eric Deakins	12,472	54.5	―6.7
Conservative	Frederick Silvester	7,870	34.6	+9.9
Liberal	Ian W. Roxburgh	2,564	11.2	―2.9
Majority		4,602	20.2	―16.2
Turnout		22,906	65.14	―5.9
Registered electors				
Labour hold		Swing		

Parliament of the United Kingdom
Preceded by Limehouse	Constituency represented by the prime minister 1950–1951	Succeeded by Woodford
Preceded by Woodford	Constituency represented by the leader of the opposition 1951–1955	Succeeded by Lewisham South
