= Colin Allen Hart-Leverton =

British lawyer and politician

Colin Allen Hart-Leverton KC (born 10 May 1936) is a British former lawyer and Liberal Party politician. He lives in north west London.

== Background ==
Hart-Leverton was born the son of Monty Hart-Leverton and Betty Simmonds. He was educated at Stowe School. In 1990 he married Kathi Jo Davidson.

== Professional career ==
Hart-Leverton qualified in 1957 as a Member of the Institute of Taxation, the youngest ever to have qualified. He was called to the Bar by Middle Temple in 1957, again the youngest to have ever qualified. He was the Prosecuting Counsel at the Central Criminal Court from 1974–79. He was appointed a Deputy Circuit Judge in 1975. He was Attorney-at-Law at the Turks and Caicos Islands in the Caribbean in 1976. In 1979 he became a Queen's Counsel and served as a Recorder of the Crown Court from 1979–2001. He was also a Professional pianist with various well-known jazz bands.

== Political career ==
Hart-Leverton joined the Liberal Party and was Chairman of Highgate Young Liberals and an Executive member of London League of Young Liberals. At the age of 22 he was Liberal candidate for the Bristol West division at the 1959 General Election. He was Liberal candidate for the Walthamstow West division at the 1964 General Election. He did not stand for parliament again.

=== Electoral record ===
General Election 1959: Bristol West
Party	Candidate	Votes	%	±%
Conservative	Robert Cooke	27,768	67.3	
Labour	Michael Cocks	7,651	18.6	
Liberal	Colin Hart-Leverton	5,835	14.1	
Majority		20,117	48.7	
Turnout			73.6	
Conservative hold		Swing		

General Election 1964: Walthamstow West
Party	Candidate	Votes	%	±%
Labour	Edward Redhead	14,405	56.22	
Conservative	Edward Michael Ogden	6,780	26.46	
Liberal	Colin Hart-Leverton	4,437	17.32	
Majority		7,625	29.76	
Turnout			72.15	
Labour hold		Swing		
