= Philip Guedalla =

English barrister and historian (1889–1944)

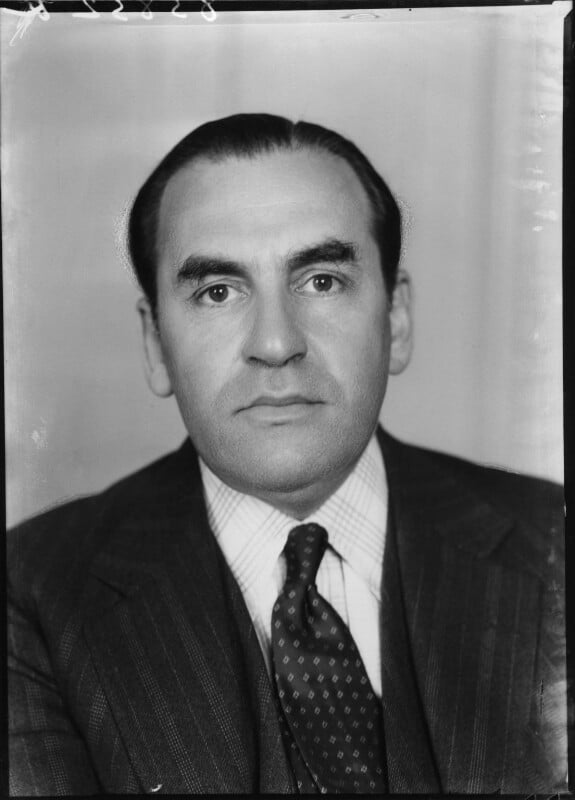
- Guedalla in 1939
- Born: 12 March 1889; Maida Vale, London, England
- Died: 16 December 1944 (aged 55); London, England
- Education: Rugby School, Balliol College, Oxford
- Occupations: Barrister, historian, biographer
- Notable work: The Duke, The Second Empire

Philip Guedalla (12 March 1889 – 16 December 1944) was an English barrister, and a popular historical and travel writer and biographer. His wit and epigrams are well-known, one example being "Even reviewers read a Preface". He also was the originator of a now-common theory on Henry James, writing that "The work of Henry James has always seemed divisible by a simple dynastic arrangement into three reigns: James I, James II, and the Old Pretender."

== Family and education ==
Guedalla was born in Maida Vale, London, into a secular Jewish family of Spanish origin; in later life he embraced his Jewish identity. He was educated at Rugby School and Balliol College, Oxford, where he in 1911 was the President of the Oxford Union; and was published in Oxford Poetry 1910–1913. In 1919 he married Nellie Maude Reitlinger, the daughter of a banker. They never had children. Asked how to say his name, he told The Literary Digest "My own pronunciation is gwuh-dal'lah. I have very little doubt that this is wholly incorrect."

== Career ==
Having been called to the Bar by the Inner Temple, Guedalla practised as a barrister from 1913 to 1923, before turning to writing. During the First World War he organised and acted as secretary to the Flax Control Board and also served as legal adviser to the Contracts Departments of the War Office and the Ministry of Munitions.

In the Autumn of 1936 a joint committee of the British Council, the Foreign Office, Overseas Trade Department, British Film Institute, and the Travel Association (the contemporary equivalent of VisitBritain) was set up under the Chairmanship of Guedalla, with the aim of selecting (and later producing) British documentaries for overseas distribution.

When the Travel Association closed in 1939 (due to the United Kingdom joining the Second World War), the British Council took ownership of the committee's activities to establish the British Council's Film Department. Despite his role in the Royal Air Force, where he held the rank of Squadron Leader, Guedalla became the Chair of this department and actively shaped its activities.

Guedalla's military service in Africa with the RAF at the beginning of 1944 led to him becoming very unwell; this is reflected in the film department's production notes, which are held in The National Archives, and his absence drastically reduced the department's outputs for the year.

He was also President of the British Zionist Federation, president of the Jewish Historical Society of England and Vice-President of the Jewish Representative Council.

== Politics ==
Guedalla was a parliamentary candidate for the Liberal Party five times, always unsuccessfully. He first stood for Parliament as a Liberal at the 1922 general election in Hackney North in a straight fight with the incumbent Conservative Sir Walter Greene, MP. Greene held the seat with a majority of 4,615 votes.

General Election 1922: Hackney North Electorate 33,706
Party	Candidate	Votes	%	±%
Conservative	Sir Walter Raymond Greene	13,002	60.8	−9.8
Liberal	Philip Guedalla	8,387	39.2	+9.8
Majority		4,615	21.6	−19.6
Turnout		21,389	63.5	+13.2
Conservative hold		Swing	-9.8	

At the 1923 general election Guedalla was adopted as Liberal candidate for the Derbyshire North East constituency. This looked as if it might be a winnable seat for the Liberals as at the general election of 1922 the Liberal candidate Stanley Holmes had come within 15 votes of taking the seat from Labour in a three-cornered contest. Despite the boost the Liberals had received in the run-up to the 1923 general election with the reunion of the Lloyd George and Asquithian wings of the party, Guedalla was unable to gain Derbyshire North East and fell to the foot of the poll behind the Conservatives.

General Election 1923: North East Derbyshire Electorate 36,712
Party	Candidate	Votes	%	±%
Labour	Frank Lee	10,971	39.5	+5.6
Conservative	Charles Waterhouse	8,768	31.5	−0.7
Liberal	Philip Guedalla	8,080	29.0	−4.9
Majority		2,203	8.0	+8.0
Turnout		27,819	75.8	−1.5
Labour hold		Swing	+3.1	

He tried again in Derbyshire North East at the 1924 general election but again came third behind the Tories in a three-cornered fight.

General Election 1924: North East Derbyshire Electorate 38,025
Party	Candidate	Votes	%	±%
Labour	Frank Lee	13,420	44.9	+5.4
Conservative	George Robert Harland Bowden	9,914	33.2	+1.7
Liberal	Philip Guedalla	6,529	21.9	−7.1
Majority		3,506	11.7	+3.7
Turnout		29,863	78.5	+2.7
Labour hold		Swing	+1.8	

Guedalla next attempted to enter the House of Commons as Liberal candidate for Manchester Rusholme at the 1929 general election. This had been a Liberal seat between 1923 and 1924 having been held by Charles Masterman a former Liberal Cabinet minister. Guedalla maintained second place behind the sitting Tory MP Sir Frank Boyd Merriman but was unable to regain the seat.

General Election 1929: Manchester Rusholme Electorate 42,289
Party	Candidate	Votes	%	±%
Conservative	Sir Frank Boyd Merriman	14,230	42.8	−7.6
Liberal	Philip Guedalla	10,958	32.9	+3.5
Labour	Jerrold Adshead	8,080	24.3	+4.1
Majority		3,272	9.9	−11.1
Turnout		33,268	78.7	−1.1
Conservative hold		Swing	-5.5	

At the 1931 general election Guedalla moved constituencies again, this time to nearby Manchester Withington. This was a Liberal seat, held between 1923–1924 and 1929-1931 by Ernest Simon. However, in the summer of 1931 an economic crisis led to the formation of a National Government led by prime minister Ramsay MacDonald supported by a small number of National Labour MPs and initially backed by the Conservative and Liberal parties. In many constituencies the main opposition party to Labour simply assumed the mantle of the Coalition government but in Manchester the Conservative and Liberal parties could not work together to agree an electoral pact, even in the unique circumstances of the national emergency. So Guedalla found himself opposed by Edward Fleming for the Conservatives who won the seat comfortably with a majority of 14,718.

General Election 1931: Manchester Withington Electorate 75,782
Party	Candidate	Votes	%	±%
Conservative	Edward Fleming	36,097	62.8	+23.0
Liberal	Philip Guedalla	21,379	37.2	−6.6
Majority		14,718	25.6	29.6
Turnout		48,168	75.8	−2.0
Conservative gain from Liberal		Swing	+14.8	

In 1936 he was elected to serve on the Liberal Party Council.

== Death ==
Guedalla died in hospital in London on 16 December 1944 at age 55, having contracted an illness during his service in the RAF.

== Sleuth reference ==
In the play Sleuth by Anthony Shaffer, mystery writer Andrew Wyke says, "Do you agree that the detective story is the normal recreation of noble minds? I'm quoting from Philip Guedalla, a biographer of the thirties, that golden age when every Cabinet Minister had a thriller by his bedside and all detectives were titled."

== Works ==
- Ignes Fatui - A Book of Parodies (Oxford: B. H. Blackwell; London: Simpkin, Marshall, 1911)
- The Partition of Europe: A Textbook of European History, 1715-1815 (Oxford: Clarendon Press, 1914)
- Supers and Supermen: Studies in Politics, History and Letters (London: T. Fisher Unwin, 1920)
- The Second Empire: Bonapartism, The Prince, The President, The Emperor (London: Hodder and Stoughton, 1922)
- Masters and Men (London: Constable, 1923) essays
- The Secret of the Coup d'État: Unpublished Correspondence of Prince Louis Napoleon, MM. De Morny, De Flahault, and Others, 1848-1852 (London: Constable, 1924) with the Earl of Kerry
- A Gallery (London: Constable, 1924)
- Napoleon and Palestine (London: G. Allen & Unwin, 1925) - Arthur Davis Memorial Lecture
- Essays of To-day and Yesterday (London: G. G. Harrap, 1926)
- Palmerston (London: Ernest Benn, 1926)
- Independence Day: A Sketchbook (n.p.: J. Murray, 1926); American edition as Fathers of the Revolution (New York: G. P. Putnam's Sons, 1926)
- Collected Essays of Philip Guedalla, 4 vols (London: Hodder and Stoughton, 1927) - vol. 1 Men of Letters, vol. 2 Men of Affairs, vol. 3 Men of War, vol. 4 Still Life
- Conquistador: American Fantasia (London: Hodder & Stoughton, 1927)
- Gladstone and Palmerston: Being the Correspondence of Lord Palmerston With Mr. Gladstone 1851-1865 (London: V. Gollancz Ltd, 1928)
- Bonnet and Shawl (New York: C. Gauge; London: Hodder and Stoughton, 1928)
- Mary Arnold (1928) - reprinted from Bonnet and Shawl
- The Missing Muse and Other Essays (London: Hodder and Stoughton, 1928)
- Slings and Arrows: Sayings Chosen from the Speeches of the Rt. Hon. David Lloyd George (London: Cassell and Company, 1929) editor
- The Duke (London: Hodder and Stoughton, 1931; much reprinted; reissued 1997, ISBN 1-85326-679-5); American edition as Wellington (New York: Harper, 1931)
- If the Moors in Spain Had Won (n.p.d., [1931?]), reprinted from If It Had Happened Otherwise, edited by J. C. Squire (London: Longmans, Green, 1931)
- Argentine Tango (London: Hodder and Stoughton, 1932)
- The Queen and Mr. Gladstone (London: Hodder and Stoughton, 1933; Garden City, New York: Doubleday, Doran & Company Inc., 1934)
- The Hundred Days (London: Peter Davies, 1934)
- Letters of Napoleon to Marie Louise (1935) introduction, with Charles de la Roncière
- The Hundred Years (London: Hodder and Stoughton, 1936)
- Idylls of the Queen (London: Hodder and Stoughton, 1937)
- Ragtime and Tango (London : Hodder and Stoughton, 1938)
- Lecture on Modern Biography (Buenos Aires: Argentine Association of English Culture, 1939)
- The Hundredth Year (London: Thornton Butterworth, 1939) - "a record of the year 1936"
- The Jewish Past (London: Jewish Historical Society of England, 1939) - Presidential address delivered before the Jewish Historical Society of England
- The Other Americas (London: Hutchinson, 1941) - talks given by P. Guedalla and J. A. Camacho between April and July 1941, in the Home Service programme of the B.B.C.
- Mr Churchill (London: Pan, 1941)
- The Liberators (London: Hodder and Stoughton, 1942)
- The Two Marshals: Bazaine, Pétain (London: Hodder and Stoughton, 1943)
- Middle East, 1940 to 1942: A Study in Air Power (London: Hodder and Stoughton, 1944)

Guedalla also chaired the Royal Institute of International Affairs study group that prepared the report The Republics of South America (1937)
