= Bristol West =

Parliamentary constituency in the United Kingdom, 1885–2024

Coordinates: 51.46301°N 2.60827°W

- Former borough constituency for the House of Commons
- Boundary of Bristol West in Avon

- Location of Avon within England
- County: City of Bristol
- Electorate: 84,571 (2018)
- Major settlements: Bristol

1885–2024
- Seats: One
- Created from: Bristol
- Replaced by: Bristol Central; Bristol East; Bristol North West

Bristol West was a borough constituency represented in the House of Commons of the Parliament of the United Kingdom from 2015 to 2024 (when it was renamed) by Thangam Debbonaire of the Labour Party. It mostly covered the central and western parts of Bristol.

Following the completion of the 2023 Periodic Review of Westminster constituencies, the seat was reduced in size, with part of the Bishopston and Ashley Down ward being transferred to Bristol North West, and Lawrence Hill and Easton wards to Bristol East. It was also renamed to Bristol Central, and first contested at the 2024 general election.

== Constituency profile ==
More urban since boundary changes in 2010, the seat retains a high proportion of the city's most garden-rich, grandest houses and landscaped civic parks in affluent suburbs such as Clifton and Redland. Many of the townhouses in Bristol were subdivided in the latter half of the 20th century, during which time the size of the University of Bristol increased (the city's largest single independent employer which is chiefly in the seat). The seat also includes poorer areas such as Lawrence Hill and Easton.

== Boundaries ==
Map of boundaries 2010–2024

1885–1918: The Municipal Borough of Bristol wards: Clifton, St Augustine's, St Michael's, and Westbury, and the local government district of Horfield.

1918–1950: The County Borough of Bristol wards: Clifton North, Clifton South, Horfield, Redland, St Michael, and Westbury-on-Trym.

1950–1955: The County Borough of Bristol wards: Bishopston, Clifton, Redland, St Augustine, St James, and St Michael.

1955–1974: The County Borough of Bristol wards: Bishopston, Cabot, Clifton, Durdham, and Redland.

1974–1983: as above plus District

1983–1997: The City of Bristol wards of Ashley, Bishopston, Cabot, Clifton, Cotham, Henleaze, Redland, and Stoke Bishop.

1997–2010: as above plus Westbury-on-Trym.

2010–2024: as above less Westbury-on-Trym, Stoke Bishop and Henleaze, plus Clifton East, Easton, and Lawrence Hill

The above shows that the changes implemented for the 2010 general election boundaries were relatively great, recommended by a periodic impartial Boundary Commission review. Easton and Lawrence Hill wards were transferred from Bristol East, while Henleaze, Stoke Bishop and Westbury-on-Trym wards were lost to Bristol North West. During the 2007 review, a proposal to rename the constituency as "Bristol Central" was rejected.

== History ==
Held by Conservatives continuously for 112 years, it was at various points represented by Conservative cabinet ministers Michael Hicks-Beach, Oliver Stanley, Walter Monckton and William Waldegrave. As part of a national Labour Party landslide, exceeding that of 1945, the 1997 gain by Valerie Davey was from a third-placed starting point for the party's candidate in 1992. That win, declared on the night of the election at 3:15 am, took Labour over the threshold of 330 seats required for an overall majority in the new House of Commons. At the 2005 election the seat was Liberal Democrat target number 18, and Conservative target number 50; it had been frequently described in the media as a "three-way marginal", and all parties fought hard for the constituency. The seat was taken by Liberal Democrat Stephen Williams with a large majority, thought to have been aided by the large student electorate, hostile to Labour's top-up fees policy. This Liberal Democrat success was similar to those in other seats with a large student population, such as Cambridge, Manchester Withington, Leeds North West and Cardiff Central. In the 2010 election, Stephen Williams held the seat with an increased majority. In the 2015 general election, the Lib Dem vote fell by 29.2%; Williams came a distant third behind the winning Labour candidate Thangam Debbonaire and more than 5,000 votes behind the Green Party candidate, who achieved the greatest increase in the Green vote (+23%) in any seat that election. In 2017 Bristol West had the biggest swing to Labour in the country. The 52.1% majority was also the largest in the seat since 1931.

In the 2016 referendum to leave the European Union, the constituency voted remain by 79.3%. This was the second highest support for remain for a constituency.

As a result of the formation of a Brexit 'Unite to Remain' pact between the Liberal Democrats, the Green Party and Plaid Cymru prior to the 2019 snap election, the Liberal Democrats agreed to withdraw from the Bristol West election in favour of the Green Party. The result was a doubling of the Green vote and a reduction in the Labour majority by almost 10,000, but with a majority of over 28,000 for the Labour Party, the seat remains very safe.

As of February 2023, 17 of the 20 city councillors in the Bristol West Constituency were from the Green Party.

== Members of Parliament ==
Election	Member	Party
1885	Michael Hicks-Beach	Conservative
1906	George Gibbs	Conservative
1928 by-election	Cyril Culverwell	Conservative
1945	Oliver Stanley	Conservative
1951 by-election	Walter Monckton	Conservative
1957 by-election	Robert Cooke	Conservative
1979	William Waldegrave	Conservative
1997	Valerie Davey	Labour
2005	Stephen Williams	Liberal Democrats
2015	Thangam Debbonaire	Labour

== Elections ==
=== Elections in the 2010s ===
General election 2019: Bristol West
Party	Candidate	Votes	%	±%
Labour	Thangam Debbonaire	47,028	62.3	−3.6
Green	Carla Denyer	18,809	24.9	+12.0
Conservative	Suria Aujla	8,822	11.7	−2.1
Brexit Party	Neil Hipkiss	869	1.2	New
Majority		28,219	37.4	−14.7
Turnout		75,528	76.1	−1.0
Labour hold		Swing		

General election 2017: Bristol West
Party	Candidate	Votes	%	±%
Labour	Thangam Debbonaire	47,213	65.9	+30.2
Conservative	Annabel Tall	9,877	13.8	−1.4
Green	Molly Scott Cato	9,216	12.9	−13.9
Liberal Democrats	Stephen Williams	5,201	7.3	−11.5
Money Free Party	Jodian Rodgers	101	0.1	New
Majority		37,336	52.1	+43.2
Turnout		71,608	77.1	+5.1
Labour hold		Swing	+15.8	

General election 2015: Bristol West
Party	Candidate	Votes	%	±%
Labour	Thangam Debbonaire	22,900	35.7	+8.2
Green	Darren Hall	17,227	26.8	+23.0
Liberal Democrats	Stephen Williams	12,103	18.8	−29.2
Conservative	Claire Hiscott	9,752	15.2	−3.2
UKIP	Paul Turner	1,940	3.0	+1.8
Independent	Dawn Parry	204	0.3	New
Left Unity	Stewart Weston	92	0.1	New
Majority		5,673	8.9	N/A
Turnout		64,218	72.0	+5.1
Labour gain from Liberal Democrats		Swing		

(Note that the vote-share changes for 2010 are from the notional results on the new boundaries, not the actual 2005 results)

General election 2010: Bristol West
Party	Candidate	Votes	%	±%
Liberal Democrats	Stephen Williams	26,593	48.0	+8.9
Labour	Paul Smith	15,227	27.5	−9.0
Conservative	Nick Yarker	10,169	18.4	+2.0
Green	Ricky Knight	2,090	3.8	−1.9
UKIP	Christopher Lees	655	1.2	−0.1
Independent	Danny Kushlick	343	0.6	New
English Democrat	Jon Baker	270	0.5	New
Majority		11,366	20.5	+11.6
Turnout		55,347	66.9	+3.3
Liberal Democrats hold		Swing	+9.0	

=== Elections in the 2000s ===
General election 2005: Bristol West
Party	Candidate	Votes	%	±%
Liberal Democrats	Stephen Williams	21,987	38.3	+9.4
Labour	Valerie Davey	16,859	29.4	−7.4
Conservative	David Martin	15,429	26.9	−1.9
Green	Justin Quinnell	2,163	3.8	+0.3
UKIP	Simon Muir	439	0.8	−0.1
Socialist Labour	Bernard Kennedy	329	0.6	−0.5
Save Bristol North Baths Party	Douglas Reid	190	0.3	New
Majority		5,128	8.9	N/A
Turnout		57,396	70.5	+4.9
Liberal Democrats gain from Labour		Swing	+8.4	

General election 2001: Bristol West
Party	Candidate	Votes	%	±%
Labour	Valerie Davey	20,505	36.8	+1.6
Liberal Democrats	Stephen Williams	16,079	28.9	+0.9
Conservative	Pamela Chesters	16,040	28.8	−4.0
Green	John Devaney	1,961	3.5	+2.1
Socialist Labour	Bernard J. Kennedy	590	1.1	+0.7
UKIP	Simon D. Muir	490	0.9	New
Majority		4,426	7.9	+5.5
Turnout		55,665	65.6	−7.8
Labour hold		Swing		

=== Elections in the 1990s ===
General election 1997: Bristol West
Party	Candidate	Votes	%	±%
Labour	Valerie Davey	22,068	35.2	+10.5
Conservative	William Waldegrave	20,575	32.8	−9.4
Liberal Democrats	Charles R. Boney	17,551	28.0	−2.7
Referendum	Margot Beauchamp	1,304	2.1	New
Green	Justin Quinnell	852	1.4	−0.3
Socialist Labour	Roy Nurse	244	0.4	New
Natural Law	Jai Brierley	47	0.1	−0.1
Majority		1,493	2.4	N/A
Turnout		62,641	73.8	−0.2
Labour gain from Conservative		Swing	+11.4	

General election 1992: Bristol West
Party	Candidate	Votes	%	±%
Conservative	William Waldegrave	22,169	42.2	−3.3
Liberal Democrats	Charles Boney	16,098	30.7	−0.6
Labour	Hedley Bashforth	12,992	24.7	+3.8
Green	George Sawday	906	1.7	−0.3
Natural Law	David James Cross	104	0.2	New
Revolutionary Communist	Ben Brent	92	0.2	New
Struck Off and Die Doctors Alliance	Phil Hammond	87	0.2	New
Anti-Federalist League	Timothy Hedges	42	0.1	New
Majority		6,071	11.5	−2.7
Turnout		52,490	74.0	−1.0
Conservative hold		Swing	−1.4	

=== Elections in the 1980s ===
General election 1987: Bristol West
Party	Candidate	Votes	%	±%
Conservative	William Waldegrave	24,695	45.5	−3.6
Liberal	George Ferguson	16,992	31.3	+1.9
Labour	Mary Georghiou	11,337	20.9	+1.4
Green	Gundula Dorey	1,096	2.0	+0.3
Communist	Veronica Ralph	134	0.3	New
Majority		7,703	14.2	−5.5
Turnout		54,254	75.0	+4.3
Conservative hold		Swing		

General election 1983: Bristol West
Party	Candidate	Votes	%	±%
Conservative	William Waldegrave	25,400	49.1	
Liberal	George Ferguson	15,222	29.4	
Labour	Pamela Tatlow	10,094	19.5	
Ecology	James Scott	872	1.7	
Independent	Sebastian Boyle	142	0.3	
Majority		10,178	19.7	
Turnout		51,730	70.7	
Conservative hold		Swing		

=== Elections in the 1970s ===
General election 1979: Bristol West
Party	Candidate	Votes	%	±%
Conservative	William Waldegrave	22,257	52.6	+5.7
Labour	Vivien Bath	9,691	22.9	−0.8
Liberal	Bernard Silver	8,881	21.0	−8.3
Ecology	John K. Ingham	1,154	2.7	New
National Front	M. Jones	246	0.6	New
United Democratic Party	Raymond R. Redmore	93	0.2	New
Majority		12,566	29.7	+12.1
Turnout		42,322	71.6	+6.2
Conservative hold		Swing		

General election October 1974: Bristol West
Party	Candidate	Votes	%	±%
Conservative	Robert Cooke	18,555	46.9	−1.4
Liberal	Robert G.R. Stacey	11,598	29.3	−0.6
Labour	John Malos	9,372	23.7	+1.9
Majority		6,957	17.6	−0.8
Turnout		39,525	65.4	−7.3
Conservative hold		Swing		

General election February 1974: Bristol West
Party	Candidate	Votes	%	±%
Conservative	Robert Cooke	21,141	48.3	−11.9
Liberal	Robert G.R. Stacey	13,076	29.9	+14.6
Labour	John Malos	9,526	21.8	−2.7
Majority		8,065	18.4	−17.3
Turnout		43,743	72.7	+6.4
Conservative hold		Swing		

General election 1970: Bristol West
Party	Candidate	Votes	%	±%
Conservative	Robert Cooke	20,110	60.2	+3.5
Labour	David J. Blackman	8,175	24.5	+0.8
Liberal	Robert G.R. Stacey	5,108	15.3	−4.3
Majority		11,935	35.7	+2.7
Turnout		33,393	66.3	−5.9
Conservative hold		Swing		

=== Elections in the 1960s ===
General election 1966: Bristol West
Party	Candidate	Votes	%	±%
Conservative	Robert Cooke	19,783	56.7	−1.3
Labour	Leslie Walter Bosisto	8,265	23.7	+3.7
Liberal	Robert G.R. Stacey	6,850	19.6	−0.5
Majority		11,518	33.0	−4.9
Turnout		34,898	72.2	−1.0
Conservative hold		Swing		

General election 1964: Bristol West
Party	Candidate	Votes	%	±%
Conservative	Robert Cooke	21,230	58.0	−9.3
Liberal	Keith Basil Wedmore	7,366	20.1	+6.0
Labour	Donald McLaren	7,306	20.0	+1.4
Taxpayers' Coalition Party	P. Michael Kingston	709	1.9	New
Majority		13,864	37.9	−10.8
Turnout		36,611	73.2	−0.4
Conservative hold		Swing		

=== Elections in the 1950s ===
General election 1959: Bristol West
Party	Candidate	Votes	%	±%
Conservative	Robert Cooke	27,768	67.3	−8.0
Labour	Michael Cocks	7,651	18.6	−6.1
Liberal	Colin Hart-Leverton	5,835	14.1	New
Majority		20,117	48.7	−1.9
Turnout		41,254	73.6	−1.0
Conservative hold		Swing		

1957 Bristol West by-election
Party	Candidate	Votes	%	±%
Conservative	Robert Cooke	24,585	70.2	−5.1
Labour	Bill Rodgers	10,423	29.8	+5.1
Majority		14,162	40.4	−10.2
Turnout		35,008	61.1	−13.5
Conservative hold		Swing	-5.1	

General election 1955: Bristol West
Party	Candidate	Votes	%	±%
Conservative	Walter Monckton	32,767	75.3	+11.7
Labour	Walter Johnson	10,766	24.7	−4.1
Majority		22,001	50.6	+15.8
Turnout		43,533	74.6	−6.0
Conservative hold		Swing		

General election 1951: Bristol West
Party	Candidate	Votes	%	±%
Conservative	Walter Monckton	25,858	63.6	+4.7
Labour	Harold Lawrance	11,716	28.8	−1.2
Liberal	David Goldblatt	3,115	7.7	−3.4
Majority		14,142	34.8	+5.9
Turnout		40,689	80.6	−1.8
Conservative hold		Swing		

1951 Bristol West by-election
Party	Candidate	Votes	%	±%
Conservative	Walter Monckton	22,216	81.4	−22.5
Labour	Harold Lawrance	5,072	18.6	−11.4
Majority		17,144	62.8	+33.9
Turnout		44,432	53.6	−28.8
Conservative hold		Swing		

General election 1950: Bristol West
Party	Candidate	Votes	%	±%
Conservative	Oliver Stanley	24,920	58.9	+10.3
Labour	Edward Bishop	12,677	30.0	−8.0
Liberal	Hilda Nuttall	4,688	11.1	−2.3
Majority		12,243	28.9	+18.3
Turnout		42,285	82.4	+7.7
Conservative hold		Swing		

=== Elections in the 1940s ===
General election 1945: Bristol West
Party	Candidate	Votes	%	±%
Conservative	Oliver Stanley	32,149	48.6	−22.4
Labour	William Edward Balmer	25,163	38.0	+9.0
Liberal	Desmond Allhusen	8,849	13.4	New
Majority		6,986	10.6	−31.4
Turnout		66,161	74.7	+3.9
Conservative hold		Swing		

=== Elections in the 1930s ===
General election 1935: Bristol West
Party	Candidate	Votes	%	±%
Conservative	Cyril Culverwell	36,820	71.0	−12.0
Labour	Percy Williams	15,058	29.0	+12.0
Majority		21,762	42.0	−24.0
Turnout		51,878	70.8	−8.5
Conservative hold		Swing		

General election 1931: Bristol West
Party	Candidate	Votes	%	±%
Conservative	Cyril Culverwell	43,264	83.0	+29.3
Labour	F. E. White	8,875	17.0	−8.3
Majority		34,389	66.0	+37.6
Turnout		52,139	79.3	+1.6
Conservative hold		Swing		

=== Elections in the 1920s ===
General election 1929: Bristol West
Party	Candidate	Votes	%	±%
Unionist	Cyril Culverwell	25,416	53.7	−25.3
Labour	Clare Annesley	11,961	25.3	+4.3
Liberal	William Nichols Marcy	9,909	21.0	N/A
Majority		13,455	28.4	−29.6
Turnout		47,286	77.7	+2.6
Registered electors		60,844		
Unionist hold		Swing	−14.8	

1928 Bristol West by-election
Party	Candidate	Votes	%	±%
Unionist	Cyril Culverwell	16,970	57.2	−21.8
Labour	Clare Annesley	7,702	26.0	+5.0
Liberal	William Nichols Marcy	4,996	16.8	New
Majority		9,268	31.2	−26.8
Turnout		29,688	67.6	−7.5
Registered electors		43,900		
Unionist hold		Swing	−13.4	

General election 1924: Bristol West
Party	Candidate	Votes	%	±%
Unionist	George Gibbs	23,574	79.0	N/A
Labour	Matt Giles	6,276	21.0	New
Majority		17,298	58.0	N/A
Turnout		29,850	75.1	N/A
Registered electors		39,752		
Unionist hold		Swing	N/A	

General election 1923: Bristol West
Party	Candidate	Votes	%	±%
Unionist	George Gibbs	Unopposed		
Unionist hold				

General election 1922: Bristol West
Party	Candidate	Votes	%	±%
Unionist	George Gibbs	18,124	62.0	N/A
Liberal	Frank Raffety	11,100	38.0	New
Majority		7,024	24.0	N/A
Turnout		29,224	76.9	N/A
Registered electors		38,013		
Unionist hold		Swing	N/A	

1921 Bristol West by-election
Party		Candidate	Votes	%	±%
C	Unionist	George Gibbs	Unopposed		
	Unionist hold				
C indicates candidate endorsed by the coalition government.

=== Elections in the 1910s ===
General election 1918: Bristol West
Party		Candidate	Votes	%	±%
C	Unionist	George Gibbs	Unopposed		
	Unionist hold				
C indicates candidate endorsed by the coalition government.

== Election results 1885–1918 ==
=== Elections in the 1880s ===
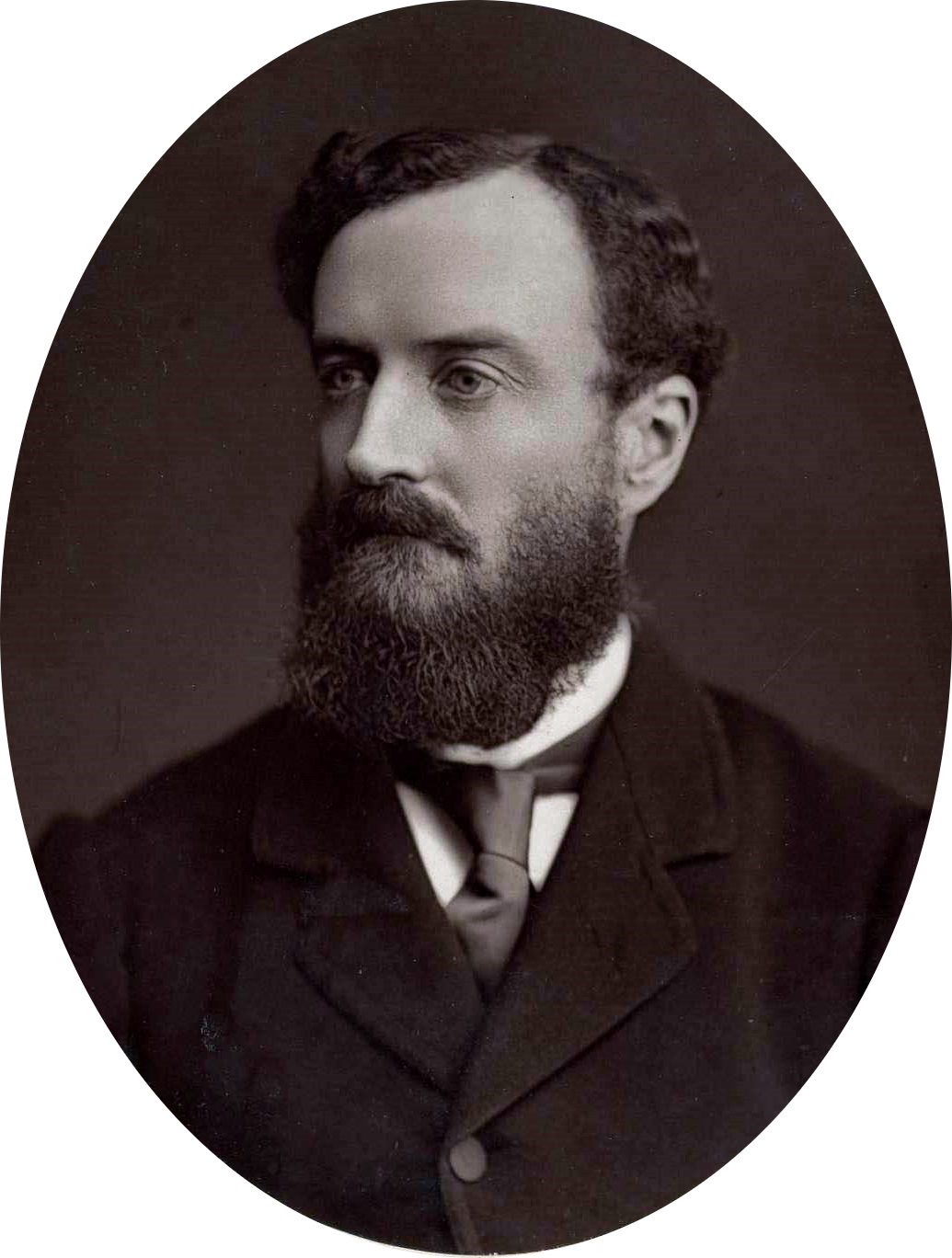
Hicks Beach

General election 1885: Bristol West
Party	Candidate	Votes	%
Conservative	Michael Hicks Beach	3,876	61.1
Liberal	Brinsley de Courcy Nixon	2,463	38.9
Majority		1,413	22.2
Turnout		6,339	82.8
Registered electors		7,657	
Conservative win (new seat)			

General election 1886: Bristol West
Party	Candidate	Votes	%	±%
Conservative	Michael Hicks Beach	3,819	68.0	+6.9
Liberal	James Judd	1,801	32.0	−6.9
Majority		2,018	36.0	+13.8
Turnout		5,620	73.4	−9.4
Registered electors		7,657		
Conservative hold		Swing	+6.9	

Hicks Beach was appointed Chief Secretary to the Lord Lieutenant of Ireland, requiring a by-election.

1886 Bristol West by-election
Party	Candidate	Votes	%	±%
Conservative	Michael Hicks Beach	Unopposed		
Conservative hold				

Hicks Beach was appointed President of the Board of Trade, requiring a by-election.

1888 Bristol West by-election
Party	Candidate	Votes	%	±%
Conservative	Michael Hicks Beach	Unopposed		
Conservative hold				

=== Elections in the 1890s ===
General election 1892: Bristol West
Party	Candidate	Votes	%	±%
Conservative	Michael Hicks Beach	Unopposed		
Conservative hold				

1895 Bristol West by-election
Party	Candidate	Votes	%	±%
Conservative	Michael Hicks Beach	Unopposed		
Conservative hold				

General election 1895: Bristol West
Party	Candidate	Votes	%	±%
Conservative	Michael Hicks Beach	3,815	67.4	N/A
Liberal	Henry Hamilton Lawless	1,842	32.6	New
Majority		1,973	34.8	N/A
Turnout		5,657	69.5	N/A
Registered electors		8,144		
Conservative hold		Swing	N/A	

=== Elections in the 1900s ===
General election 1900: Bristol West
Party	Candidate	Votes	%	±%
Conservative	Michael Hicks Beach	Unopposed		
Conservative hold				

George Gibbs

General election 1906: Bristol West
Party	Candidate	Votes	%	±%
Conservative	George Gibbs	4,267	52.2	N/A
Liberal	Thomas Lennard	3,902	47.8	New
Majority		365	4.4	N/A
Turnout		8,169	86.7	N/A
Registered electors		9,423		
Conservative hold		Swing	N/A	

=== Elections in the 1910s ===
General election January 1910: Bristol West
Party	Candidate	Votes	%	±%
Conservative	George Gibbs	5,159	57.1	+4.9
Liberal	Walter Saise	3,881	42.9	−4.9
Majority		1,278	14.2	+9.8
Turnout		9,040	89.3	+2.6
Registered electors		10,127		
Conservative hold		Swing	+4.9	

General election December 1910: Bristol West
Party	Candidate	Votes	%	±%
Conservative	George Gibbs	4,871	57.5	+0.4
Liberal	Joseph Weston Stevens	3,595	42.5	−0.4
Majority		1,276	15.0	+0.8
Turnout		8,466	83.6	−5.7
Registered electors		10,127		
Conservative hold		Swing	+0.4	

General Election 1914–15:

Another General Election was required to take place before the end of 1915. The political parties had been making preparations for an election to take place and by July 1914, the following candidates had been selected;

- Unionist: George Gibbs
- Liberal:

== See also ==
- List of parliamentary constituencies in Avon
