= Thomas Watts =

Thomas Watts may refer to:

- Thomas H. Watts (1819–1892), Democratic Governor of the U.S. state of Alabama from 1863 to 1865, during the Civil War
- Thomas Watts (1868–1951) (1868–1951), British Conservative Party Member of Parliament
- Thomas Watts (1689–1742) (died 1742), English Member of Parliament, academy master and leading figure at the Sun Fire Office
- Thomas Watts (cricketer) (1899–1976), English first-class cricketer for Surrey

== See also ==
- Thomas Watt (disambiguation)
