= Horace Crawfurd =

British politician (1881–1958)

Horace Evelyn Crawfurd (13 January 1881 – 14 March 1958) was a Liberal Party politician in the United Kingdom.

== Professional career ==
Crawfurd was a lecturer at Liverpool University. In 1930, Elinor Glyn Ltd employed Crawfurd to undertake the publicity campaign for two movies: Knowing Men (1930), which experimented with a new colour process, and The Price of Things (1931). Crawfurd also worked with the author Elinor Glyn on her own personal publicity.

== Political career ==
In 1913, Crawfurd was selected as the Liberal candidate for Southport for a general election expected to take place in 1914 or 1915. However, the election was postponed due to the Great War. He became a Flight Sub-Lieutenant in the Royal Naval Air Service and was stationed in the Far East. He continued to nurse the Southport constituency while on leave in anticipation of being selected as the candidate when the election was finally held. However, the Conservative MP for Southport, received endorsement from the Coalition Prime Minister David Lloyd George, so the Southport Liberals decided not to run a candidate against him. He unsuccessfully contested the Walthamstow West constituency at the 1922 and 1923 general elections, before winning the seat at the 1924 general election, narrowly defeating the sitting Labour MP Valentine McEntee. During the 1924-29 parliament which was dominated by a Conservative majority, Crawfurd worked closely with a group of radical Liberal MPs that included: William Wedgwood Benn, Percy Harris, Joseph Kenworthy and Frank Briant to provide opposition to the government. However, McEntee regained the seat at the 1929 general election. He stood again at the Islington East by-election in February 1931, where he finished in fourth place. He stood for election for the last time at the 1935 general election, when he finished last out of the three candidates in Leicester West. He did not stand for Parliament again.

=== Electoral record ===
General election 1922 : Walthamstow West
Party	Candidate	Votes	%	±%
Labour	Valentine McEntee	8,758	43.3	+14.0
National Democratic	Charles Jesson	6,253	30.9	
Liberal	Horace Crawfurd	5,228	25.8	
Majority		2,505	12.4	
Turnout			63.8	+16.8
Labour gain from National Democratic		Swing		

General election 1923: Walthamstow West
Party	Candidate	Votes	%	±%
Labour	Valentine McEntee	10,026	47.6	+4.3
Liberal	Horace Crawfurd	8,234	39.0	+13.2
Unionist	Jabeez Lyne	2,832	13.4	n/a
Majority		1,792	8.6	−3.8
Turnout			65.5	
Labour hold		Swing	-4.5	

General election 1924: Walthamstow West
Party	Candidate	Votes	%	±%
Liberal	Horace Crawfurd	12,991	50.9	
Labour	Valentine McEntee	12,521	49.1	
Majority		470	1.8	
Turnout			75.5	
Liberal gain from Labour		Swing		

General election 1929: Walthamstow West
Party	Candidate	Votes	%	±%
Labour	Valentine McEntee	16,050	54.0	−4.9
Liberal	Horace Crawfurd	9,470	31.9	−19.0
Unionist	Frederick C Bramston	4,184	14.1	n/a
Majority		6,580	22.1	+14.1
Turnout			73.3	−2.2
Labour gain from Liberal		Swing	+7.0	

1931 Islington East by-election
Party	Candidate	Votes	%	±%
Labour	Leah Manning	10,591	34.7	−3.3
Empire Crusade	Alfred Critchley	8,314	27.2	n/a
Conservative	Thelma Cazalet	7,182	23.5	−10.6
Liberal	Horace Crawfurd	4,450	14.6	−13.3
Majority		2,277	7.5	+3.6
Turnout			50.0	−16.4
Labour hold		Swing		

General election 1935: Leicester West
Party	Candidate	Votes	%	±%
National Labour	Harold Nicolson	15,821	43.73	
Labour	John Morgan	15,734	43.49	
Liberal	Horace Crawfurd	4,621	12.77	
Majority		87	0.24	
Turnout			66.83	
National Labour gain from Liberal		Swing		

Parliament of the United Kingdom
Preceded by Valentine McEntee	Member of Parliament for Walthamstow West; 1924 – 1929	Succeeded by Valentine McEntee
