= 1951 Bristol West by-election =

UK Parliamentary by-election

The 1951 Bristol West by-election was held on 15 February 1951. It was caused by the death of the prominent Conservative ex-Minister Oliver Stanley. It was easily retained by the Conservative candidate Walter Monckton, who received more than 80% of the votes cast.

Bristol West by-election 15 February 1951
Party	Candidate	Votes	%	±%
Conservative	Walter Monckton	22,216	81.4	+22.5
Labour	H. Lawrance	5,072	18.6	−11.4
Majority		17,144	62.8	+33.9
Turnout		27,288	53.6	−28.8
Conservative hold		Swing		
