= 1956 Walthamstow West by-election =

UK Parliamentary by-election

The 1956 Walthamstow West by-election of 1 March 1956 was held after the elevation to the Peerage of former Prime Minister, Labour MP (MP) Clement Attlee.

The seat was safe, having been won by Attlee at the 1955 general election by over 9,000 votes. The Labour Party held the seat.

== Candidates ==
- Edward Redhead for Labour was a councillor and Alderman
- The Conservatives nominated Richard Hornby, who at the time was a copywriter for JWT
- The Liberal Party chose Oliver Smedley, who in 1955 had helped found the Institute of Economic Affairs
- Perennial candidate Bill Boaks stood as an independent, which was one of his earliest parliamentary candidacies.

== Result of the previous general election ==
General election 1955: Walthamstow West
Party	Candidate	Votes	%	±%
Labour	Clement Attlee	19,327	65.73	−1.06
Conservative	Richard Hornby	10,077	34.27	+1.06
Majority		9,250	31.46	−2.12
Turnout		29,404	72.48	−9.46
Labour hold		Swing	-1.06	

== Result of the by-election ==
Walthamstow West by-election, 1 March 1956
Party	Candidate	Votes	%	±%
Labour	Edward Redhead	13,388	64.68	−1.05
Conservative	Richard Hornby	4,184	20.21	−14.06
Liberal	Oliver Smedley	3,037	14.67	New
Independent	Bill Boaks	89	0.43	New
Majority		9,204	44.47	+13.01
Turnout		20,698		
Labour hold		Swing		
