= Valentine McEntee, 1st Baron McEntee =

Irish-born Labour Member of Parliament

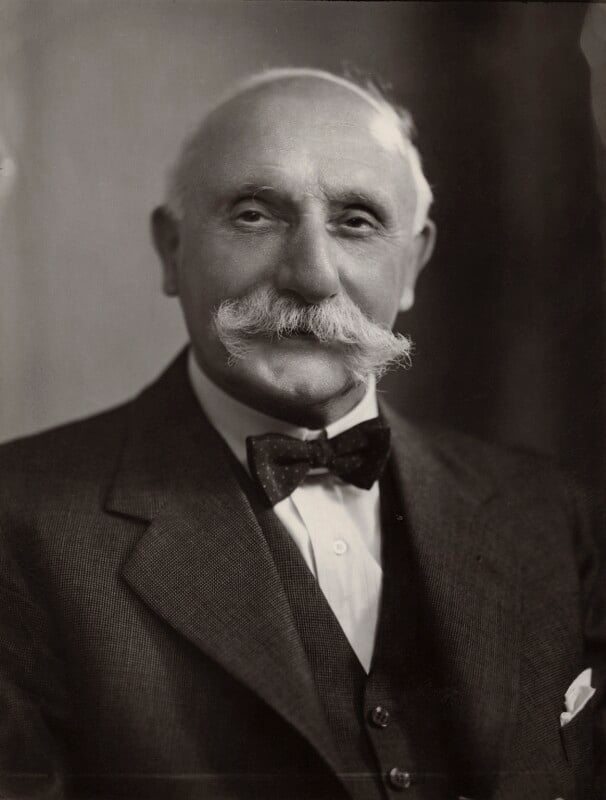
McEntee in 1953

Valentine La Touche McEntee, 1st Baron McEntee CBE (16 January 1871 – 11 February 1953) was an Irish-born Labour Member of Parliament (MP) in the United Kingdom.

== Background ==
McEntee was born in Kingstown (now Dún Laoghaire) near Dublin, the son of William Charles McEntee, a physician, and Catherine, daughter of Valentine Burchell.

== Career ==
McEntee was a carpenter by trade. From 1896 to 1899, like Con Lehane, he was a member of James Connolly's Irish Socialist Republican Party. After a brief stay in the United States he moved to London and became a member of Social Democratic Federation (SDF), whence he went on to help found the Socialist Party of Great Britain in June 1904. So far as is known McEntee was not at all active in the SPGB. He resigned on 4 March 1905 after he was nominated as parliamentary candidate for the Labour Representation Committee (predecessor of the Labour Party).

After leaving the SPGB McEntee joined the Independent Labour Party. By 1908 he was back in the SDF, being a local election candidate for that organisation in Walthamstow in that year. In 1909 he published a short pamphlet Socialism Explained, a criticism of capitalism. The following year he was a delegate at the Social Democratic Party (as the SDF had been renamed) Conference and was elected to its 1910–1911 Executive Committee.

McEntee presumably became a member of the Labour Party via the British Socialist Party, the successor to the SDF, which affiliated in 1916. During the later part of the First World War he was a member of the relatively large and actively anti-war North London Herald League, as documented in Ken Weller's Don't Be a Soldier. (Other ex-SPGBers in the NLHL include R. M. Fox of Smokey Crusade fame; Les Boyne, an early member who was also in E. J. B. Allen's Advocates of Industrial Unionism and Industrial League. Harry Young, first active in the NLHL, was an SPGB member later in life.)

In 1920, McEntee became a local councillor for the Labour Party in Walthamstow. He went on to become MP for Walthamstow West from 1922 to 1924 and again from 1929 to 1950, and served Parliamentary Private Secretary (PPS) to the Parliamentary Secretary for the Ministry of Works, George Hicks, from 1942 to 1945. He was also Mayor of Walthamstow from 1929 to 1930 and 1951 to 1952. He was appointed a CBE in 1948 and, in 1951, he was elevated to the peerage as Baron McEntee, of Walthamstow in the County of Essex, in recognition of his "political and public services".

== Personal life ==
McEntee was twice married. He married Elizabeth, daughter of Edward Crawford, in 1892. After her death he married Catherine, daughter of Charles Windsor, in 1920. He died in February 1953, aged 82, when the barony became extinct.

== Sources ==
- "Valentine McEntee", Dictionary of Labour Biography, volume X.
- Socialist Party of Great Britain (1904–1913 membership register)

Parliament of the United Kingdom
Preceded by Charles Jesson	Member of Parliament for Walthamstow West; 1922 – 1924	Succeeded by Horace Crawfurd
Preceded by Horace Crawfurd	Member of Parliament for Walthamstow West; 1929 – 1950	Succeeded by Clement Attlee
Peerage of the United Kingdom
New creation	Baron McEntee; 1951 – 1953	Extinct
