= Walter Monckton =

English lawyer and politician (1891–1965)

The Right Honourable The Viscount Monckton of Brenchley GCVO KCMG MC PC QC
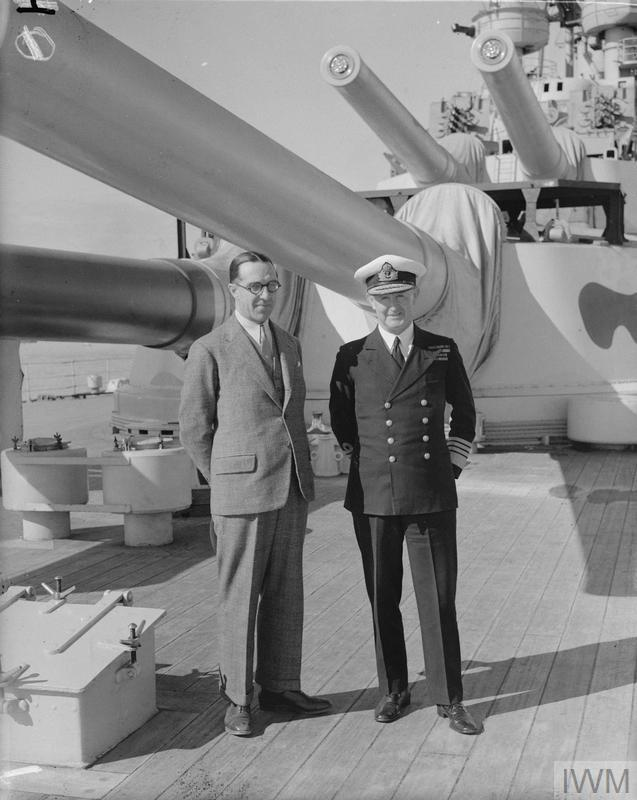
- Monckton (left) with Admiral Sir Andrew Cunningham in 1942

Minister of Defence
- In office 20 December 1955 – 18 October 1956
- Prime Minister: Anthony Eden
- Preceded by: Selwyn Lloyd
- Succeeded by: Antony Head

Personal details
- Born: Walter Turner Monckton; 17 January 1891 Plaxtol, Kent, UK
- Died: 9 January 1965 (aged 73)
- Party: Conservative
- Spouse(s): Polly Colyer-Fergusson (m. 1914; div. 1947) Bridget Monckton, 11th Lady Ruthven of Freeland (m. 1947)
- Children: Gilbert, Valerie

Walter Turner Monckton, 1st Viscount Monckton of Brenchley, GCVO, KCMG, MC, PC, QC (17 January 1891 – 9 January 1965) was a British lawyer and Conservative politician.

== Early years ==
Monckton was born in the village of Plaxtol in north Kent. He was the eldest child of paper manufacturer Frank William Monckton (1861–1924), and his wife, Dora Constance (d. 1915). He was head boy of his preparatory school, The Knoll, at Woburn Sands in Buckinghamshire, and attended Harrow School from 1904 to 1910. He played cricket for Harrow against Eton in the famous Fowler's match in 1910. He chose to enter Balliol College, Oxford, as a commoner, despite in 1910 having won an Exhibition to Hertford College. Whilst at Oxford, he played a first-class match for the combined Oxford and Cambridge Universities cricket team in 1911. In 1912 he obtained a third class in Classical Moderations and in 1914 a second in modern history. He was elected president of the Oxford Union in 1913.

Monckton paused his studies during the first world war. He attempted to enlist in the British Army, Royal Navy and Royal Flying Corps but was rejected each time due to his poor eyesight. He was finally able to join the British Army after a medical officer advised him to read the test with his good eye, memorise the details and then repeat from memory while using his bad eye. Monckton served in the Queen's Own Royal West Kent Regiment and was present at Ypres in June 1917. (Note: The Oxford Dictionary of National Biography says he was present at the Third Battle of Ypres in June 1917 but that battle didn't begin until July 1917. He may have participated in the preliminary Battle of Messines or similar engagement before the start of the larger battle.) He was awarded a Military Cross on 3 June 1919 for military operations in France and Flanders.

== Career ==
Monckton was called to the bar at the Inner Temple in 1919. In 1927 he was appointed legal advisor to the Simon Commission. He took silk on 18 February 1930.

Monckton served as advisor to King Edward VIII during the abdication crisis, having been Attorney General to the Duchy of Cornwall since 1932. He was Recorder of Hythe from 1930 to 1937. Thanks to his royal connections, he was appointed constitutional advisor to the last Nizam of Hyderabad.

He worked in propaganda and information during the Second World War and became Solicitor General in Winston Churchill's 1945 caretaker government, although he refused to join the Conservative Party.

After the 1945 general election, Monckton returned to legal practice. He also continued to serve as advisor to the Nizam of Hyderabad.

He finally joined the Conservative Party after the war and became a Member of Parliament for Bristol West at a 1951 by-election. Churchill soon appointed him to the cabinet as Minister of Labour and National Service, in which post he served from 1951 to 1955. He was Anthony Eden's Minister of Defence from 1955 to 1956, but was the only cabinet minister to oppose his Suez policy, and was moved in October to the post of Paymaster General, serving until the change of administration in early 1957.

Monckton was created Viscount Monckton of Brenchley, of Brenchley in the County of Kent on 11 February 1957. He had wanted to become Lord Chief Justice of England and indeed had been promised the job by Churchill and the two subsequent prime ministers, but in 1957 he decided instead to join the board of Midland Bank.

Monckton was chairman of Midland Bank (1957–1964), President of the Marylebone Cricket Club (1956–1957) despite reportedly once describing the club's main committee as making the Tory Cabinet look like "a band of pinkos", President of Surrey County Cricket Club (1950–1952 and 1959–1965), Chairman of the Iraq Petroleum Company (1958), and Chancellor of the University of Sussex (1961–1965).

In 1960 he headed the Monckton Commission (sometimes known as the "Advisory Commission on Central Africa"), whose report concluded that the Federation of Rhodesia and Nyasaland could not be maintained except by force or through massive changes in racial legislation. It advocated a majority of African members in the Nyasaland and Northern Rhodesian legislatures and giving these territories the option to leave the Federation after five years.

== Personal life ==
In July 1914, he married Mary "Polly" Adelaide Somes Colyer-Fergusson, daughter of Sir Thomas Colyer-Fergusson, of the Colyer-Fergusson baronets. They had a son and daughter but later grew estranged as Monckton focused on his legal work and hunting with the West Kent regiment. They divorced in 1947. On 13 August 1947, he married, secondly, Bridget Monckton, 11th Lady Ruthven of Freeland, CBE, the wartime head of the ATS counterpart in India, the Women's Army Corps (India), and also of the Women's Royal Indian Naval Service (WRINS).

He was succeeded in the viscountcy by his son Gilbert, born of his first marriage, on his death in 1965 at the age of 73.

== Arms ==
Coat of arms of Walter Monckton
Crest A martlet Or. Escutcheon 1st & 4th Sable on a chevron between three martlets Or three mullets Sable (Monckton) 2nd & 3rd Or a chevron Gules a chief Vair (St Quintin). Supporters On either side a horse Argent crined and unguled Or gorged with a chain Gold pendant therefrom an escutcheon Sable charged with a roses also Argent barbed and seeded Proper quartering St Quintin (Gules a chevron Or a chief Vair). Motto Famam Extendere Factis Badge Within an annulet a martlet Or.

== Sources ==
- The life of Viscount Monckton of Brenchley, Frederick Winston Furneaux-Smith, 1969
- Walter Monckton, H. Montgomery Hyde, 1991, ISBN 1-85619-045-5
- Cricinfo profile

Parliament of the United Kingdom
Preceded by Oliver Stanley	Member of Parliament for Bristol West; 1951–1957	Succeeded by Robert Cooke
Legal offices
Preceded by David Maxwell Fyfe	Solicitor General for England and Wales; May 1945 – July 1945	Succeeded by Frank Soskice
Political offices
Preceded by Alfred Robens	Minister of Labour and National Service; 1951–1955	Succeeded by Iain Macleod
Preceded by Selwyn Lloyd	Minister of Defence; 1955–1956	Succeeded by Antony Head
Vacant Title last held by The Earl of Selkirk	Paymaster General; 1956–1957	Succeeded by Reginald Maudling
Peerage of the United Kingdom
New creation	Viscount Monckton of Brenchley; 1957–1965	Succeeded by Gilbert Monckton
