= Criminal Injuries Compensation Authority =

Executive agency in the United Kingdom

- Type: Government agency
- Region served: United Kingdom
- Chief Executive: Lynne Henderson
- Parent organisation: Ministry of Justice
- Website: gov.uk/cica

The Criminal Injuries Compensation Authority (CICA) is an executive agency of the UK Government. The Authority, established in 1996 and based in Glasgow, administers a compensation scheme for injuries caused to victims of violent crime in England, Scotland and Wales. It is funded by the Ministry of Justice in England and Wales and the Justice Directorate in Scotland. The current Chief Executive is Lynne Henderson.

== Scheme ==
Between when the scheme was launched in 1964 and 2002, the Authority had received over 1.5 million applications and made 900,000 compensation awards, resulting in nearly £3 billion being paid to applicants, making it amongst the largest and most generous of its type in the world.

However, it has been criticised on occasions for failing to provide adequate compensation to victims of serious crime, particularly people seriously injured as a result of crime, rape victims and the parents of murdered children - most notably the parents of murdered children Sarah Payne, Damilola Taylor, Holly Wells and Jessica Chapman.

CICA employs over 300 civil service staff from the Ministry of Justice in an office in Glasgow to process and decide on applications for compensation from victims of violent crime.

Until 1996, awards were set according to what the victim would have received in a successful civil action against the offender. However, since April 1996, the level of compensation has been determined according to a scale set by Parliament. The scheme and the 1996 tariff were revised in 2001, 2008 and 2012. The tariff has descriptions of more than 400 injuries; each is attached to one of 25 levels of compensation between £1,000 and £250,000. In certain cases, victims may also apply for financial loss compensation (for example, through loss of earnings or medical care costs). By 2004, it was reported that the scheme could pay a maximum of £500,000 to victims of crime.

The payment system is based on a 35 tier system split into two parts. Part A of the CICA tariff covers injuries such as burns, paralysis, medically recognised illness, mental injury, peripheral sensory nerve damage and motor nerve damage as well as injuries to the head and neck, upper limbs, torso and lower limbs. Part B of the tariff covers fatal injuries, physical abuse in adults, sexual abuse, child abuse, infection as a result of sexual abuse and loss of foetus.

=== 2012 scheme reforms ===
In January 2012, Justice Secretary Ken Clarke proposed further reforms to the scheme. There was cross-party support for altering the Scheme to compensate victims of overseas terrorist attacks. However, there was criticism of proposals to end compensation awards for certain minor injuries, a lowering of the tariff award for many injuries and for applying more severe reductions to awards for people who have been convicted of a crime.

The 2012 scheme came into force on 30 September 2012 and applies to all claims received on or after 27 November 2012. It is less generous than previous schemes, with certain minor injuries removed altogether and others reduced in value. Residency criteria now mean that most applicants must be ordinarily resident in the UK, or a British or EU citizen. The rules on criminal convictions are more restrictive in that having an unspent criminal conviction that resulted in a prison sentence will mean automatic rejection, no matter what the offence. Claims for loss of earnings, previously always based on the applicant's actual losses up to a maximum of one-and-a-half times the national average wage, are now assessed entirely at the rate of statutory sick pay regardless of the applicant's actual losses. The total maximum award for a claim remains at £500,000, a figure that has remained unchanged since the original tariff scheme in 1996.

The cuts in compensation are described by the CICA's Chief Executive in the annual report as being "designed to put the Scheme on a more sustainable financial footing by removing awards for people with the least serious injuries and focusing awards on victims with more serious injuries". A guide to the 2012 scheme is available on the Ministry of Justice website.

== Eligibility ==
The rules in the Scheme are complex and are explained in the guide to the scheme. Injuries claimed for must have been caused by a 'crime of violence'. Annex B of the 2012 scheme sets out what this means. The first step is to establish that a crime has been committed. Whether it is a crime of violence is a more complex issue but the most typical examples are assault, murder, rape and sexual abuse. It is possible to claim for psychological injury resulting from witnessing an attack on someone else, in very limited circumstances.

The time limit for claiming compensation is two years from the date the injury occurred. There are slightly different rules in the case of applicants who are children, or who were children when they were injured. The time limit may be extended in exceptional circumstances but is treated very strictly. Ignorance of the existence of the scheme and the availability of compensation is not usually accepted as an excuse for a late application.

Residency criteria, introduced for the first time in Paragraphs 10 to 16 of the 2012 Scheme, restrict eligibility to those who are ordinarily resident in the UK (with some exceptions) and compensation may be reduced or withheld altogether from applicants who contributed to or caused the incident in which they were injured, failed to co-operate with the police or prosecuting authority, failed to or delayed reporting the incident to the police, failed to co-operate with the CICA or have one or more unspent criminal convictions.

The "same-roof rule" was a rule of English law that stated victims of domestic abuse were not entitled to compensation if they lived with the perpetrator prior to October 1979 for example as husband and wife and even if those involved ceased to live together at anytime after. This rule was retained in all subsequent changes to the law meaning that even after 1979 claimants were unable to claim compensation as a victim of crime. It was challenged several times in the courts without success. However, this rule was successfully challenged in the Court of Appeal in 2018 and therefore this rule was abolished in 2019.

== Chairmen and chief executives ==
- Sir Walker Kelly Carter (1964–1975)
- Sir Edward Michael Ogden (1975–1989)
- Lord Carlisle of Bucklow (1989–2000)
- Michael Edward Lewer
- Carole Oatway
- Linda Brown
- Lynne Henderson

== See also ==
- Compensation Agency for Northern Ireland
