= Valerie Davey =

British politician

Member of Parliament for Bristol West
- In office 1 May 1997 – 11 April 2005
- Preceded by: William Waldegrave
- Succeeded by: Stephen Williams

Personal details
- Born: Valerie Corbett; 16 April 1940 (age 86) Surrey
- Party: Labour
- Education: University of Birmingham; University College London
- Occupation: Teacher, Politician

Valerie Davey (born Valerie Corbett; 16 April 1940) is a former Labour Member of Parliament (MP) for Bristol West in England.

== Early life ==
Born in Surrey, Davey studied theology and history at the University of Birmingham and gained a PGCE at the Institute of Education in 1963. She then gained an MA in Theology, specialising in New Testament textual criticism. Entering work, she taught near Wolverhampton at the Regis Comprehensive School (now the King's Church of England School) on Regis Road in Tettenhall. After her marriage, she moved to Tanzania and taught at the Ilboru Secondary School on Ilboru Road in Arusha. Davey moved to Bristol in 1968, and concentrated on her children. She taught for one year Religious studies A level at South Gloucestershire and Stroud College. She was an Avon County Council councillor from 1981 until the county's abolition in 1996 and Labour group leader from 1992. Davey was also a governor of various schools and of Bristol Polytechnic (now the UWE).

== Parliamentary career ==
She won the three-way marginal seat of Bristol West at the 1997 general election, displacing the Conservative cabinet minister William Waldegrave, but lost it to the Liberal Democrat Stephen Williams at the 2005 general election.

In Parliament, she was a member of the House of Commons Education & Skills Committee.

== Personal life ==
She married Graham Davey in 1966 in Weston-super-Mare. They have a son and two daughters.

Parliament of the United Kingdom
Preceded by William Waldegrave	Member of Parliament for Bristol West; 1997–2005	Succeeded by Stephen Williams
