= Fred Silvester =

British politician (1933–2025)

Member of Parliament
- In office 28 February 1974 – 18 May 1987
- Preceded by: Robert Cary
- Succeeded by: Keith Bradley
- Constituency: Manchester Withington
- In office 21 September 1967 – 29 May 1970
- Preceded by: Edward Redhead
- Succeeded by: Eric Deakins
- Constituency: Walthamstow West

Personal details
- Born: Frederick John Silvester; 20 September 1933 Hackney, London, England
- Died: 5 July 2025 (aged 91)
- Party: Conservative
- Spouse: Victoria Silvester
- Children: 2

Frederick John Silvester (20 September 1933 – 5 July 2025) was a British Conservative Party politician.

== Life and career ==
The son of William Thomas Silvester and Kathleen Gertrude (née Jones), Silvester was born in Hackney, London on 20 September 1933. He was educated at Sir George Monoux Grammar School, Walthamstow, and Sidney Sussex College, Cambridge, where he achieved a first class in Part I of the history tripos and a lower second in Part II of the law tripos, graduating in 1954. After teaching at Wolstanton Grammar School in Newcastle-under-Lyme for two years he was called to the bar at Gray's Inn in 1957, but never practised and instead became an account executive with the advertising agency J. Walter Thompson.

Silvester was a Conservative member of Walthamstow Borough Council from 1961 to 1964. Having contested the Walthamstow West parliamentary constituency in 1966, he was elected a Member of Parliament (MP) at the Walthamstow West by-election in 1967, but lost the seat at the 1970 general election. He was returned to Parliament at the February 1974 general election as MP for Manchester Withington, and held that seat but he was defeated at the 1987 general election by Labour's Keith Bradley.

As an Opposition Whip during Harold Wilson's second government (1974–76), Silvester is a major character in James Graham's play This House. He was on the left of the parliamentary Conservative party, becoming PPS to the notable 'wet' Jim Prior at the Department of Employment upon the party's return to power in 1979, and was often critical of Margaret Thatcher during her time as Prime Minister.

Silvester died on 5 July 2025, at the age of 91.

== Sources ==
- The Times Guide to the House of Commons, Times Newspapers Ltd, 1966 & 1987

Parliament of the United Kingdom
Preceded by Edward Redhead	Member of Parliament for Walthamstow West; 1967–1970	Succeeded by Eric Deakins
Preceded by Sir Robert Cary, 1st Baronet	Member of Parliament for Manchester Withington; Feb 1974–1987	Succeeded by Keith Bradley
