= Ogden tables =

Actuarial tables for personal injury and fatal accident cases in the UK

The Ogden tables are a set of statistical tables and other information for use in court cases in the UK. Their purpose is to make it easier to calculate future losses in personal injury and fatal accident cases.

The tables take into account life expectancy and provide a range of discount rates from -2.0% to 3.0% in steps of 0.5%. The discount rate is fixed by the Lord Chancellor under section 1 of the Damages Act 1996. Effective 11 January 2025, this rate increased from -0.25% to 0.5% in England and Wales. The discount rate in both Scotland and Northern Ireland had already been set at 0.5% following reviews by the Government Actuary's Department, effective 26 September 2024.

The full and official name of the tables is Actuarial Tables with explanatory notes for use in Personal Injury and Fatal Accident Cases, but the unofficial name became common parlance following the Civil Evidence Act 1995, where this shorthand name was used as a subheading – Sir Michael Ogden QC having been the chairman of the Working Party for the first four editions.

== History ==
The tables were first published in 1984.

Section 10 of the Civil Evidence Act 1995 authorised their use in evidence in the UK "for the purpose of assessing, in an action for personal injury, the sum to be awarded as general damages for future pecuniary loss". They were first used by the House of Lords in Wells v. Wells in July 1999.

The 7th edition of the tables made changes to the discount rate range (previously 0.0% to 5.0% revised to -2.0% to 3.0%) to allow for a revision of the rate by the Lord Chancellor (currently under consideration as at 24 October 2011) and to provide for the implications of the case of Helmot v. Simon. The 8th edition was published in 2020 and updated in August 2022.

== Using the Ogden tables ==
There are 28 tables of data in the Ogden Tables. Table 1 (Males) and Table 2 (Females) are for life expectancy and loss for life. Tables 3 to 14 are for loss of earnings up to various retirement ages. Tables 15 to 26 are for loss of pension from various retirement ages. Table 27 is for discounting for a time in the future and Table 28 is for a recurring loss over a period of time.

=== How to calculate life expectancy ===
To calculate life expectancy, you need to use Table 1 (for males) or Table 2 (for females) and use the data in the 0% column. So for a 45 year old female, using Table 2 you would look down the first column to find 45 and then across to the 0% column which gives a figure of 43.93. In cases where the age is not a whole number, i.e. female who is 45.75 years, then you use the figure for 45 years (43.93) and the figure for 46 years (42.87) and interpolate between the two (46-45.75) x 43.93 + (45.75-45) x 42.87 to give 43.14 years.

=== How to calculate multiplier for lifetime loss ===
If the claimant is to suffer a loss that will last their entire life, you need to use Table 1 (for males) or Table 2 (for females) and use the data in the 2.5% column. So for a 50-year-old male, using Table 1 you would look down to first column to find 50 and then across to the 2.5% column which gives a figure of 22.69.

=== How to calculate value of a single loss in the future ===
If the claimant needs to pay for something in the future, then the present value can be worked out using Table 27. Look up the period in the future in the first column and then across to the 2.5% column for the multiplier. For example, a purchase required in 10 years time would need to multiplied by 0.7812.

=== How to calculate multiplier for loss over a period ===
If the claimant has a recurring loss over a period of say 15 years, then use Table 28 looking up 15 in the first column and then across to the 2.5% column which gives a multiplier of 12.54. If the loss does not start until some time in the future, then you can combine Table 27 and Table 28 to give an overall multiplier. For example a loss over a period of 15 years that starts in 10 years time would have a Table 27 multiplier of 0.7812 and a Table 28 multiplier of 12.54 giving an overall multiplier of 9.80.
