= 1928 Bristol West by-election =

UK Parliamentary by-election

The 1928 Bristol West by-election was held on 2 February 1928. The by-election was held due to the elevation to the peerage of the incumbent Conservative MP, George Gibbs. It was won by the Conservative candidate Cyril Culverwell.

== Candidates ==
The local Liberal association selected William Nichols Marcy as their candidate. Marcy was a schoolmaster who had worked in America. He had previously been a member of the Unionist Party but left them in 1924. He was standing for parliament for the first time.

== Result ==
Bristol West by-election, 1928
Party	Candidate	Votes	%	±%
Unionist	Cyril Thomas Culverwell	16,970	57.2	−21.8
Labour	Clare Annesley	7,702	26.0	+5.0
Liberal	William Nichols Marcy	4,996	16.8	New
Majority		9,268	31.2	−26.8
Turnout		29,668	67.6	−7.5
Unionist hold		Swing	-13.4	
