= Eric Deakins =

British Labour Party politician

Member of Parliament for Walthamstow
- In office 28 February 1974 – 18 May 1987
- Preceded by: Constituency established
- Succeeded by: Hugo Summerson

Member of Parliament for Walthamstow West
- In office 18 June 1970 – 7 February 1974
- Preceded by: Fred Silvester
- Succeeded by: Constituency abolished

Member of Tottenham Borough Council
- In office 1958–1961; 1962–1963

Personal details
- Born: 7 October 1932 (age 93)
- Party: Labour
- Spouse: Sandra Weaver (m. 1990)
- Children: 3
- Education: London School of Economics

Eric Petro Deakins (born 7 October 1932) is a British Labour Party politician. He was the Member of Parliament for Walthamstow West from 1970 to February 1974, and Walthamstow from that election until 1987. He has also worked as an international public affairs consultant.

== Early life ==
Deakins was born as the elder son of the late Edward Deakins and Gladys Deakins. He was educated at Tottenham Grammar School and the London School of Economics, where he graduated with a BA (Hons.) in History, and became a commercial executive with the meat trading company FMC (Meat) Ltd. He served as a councillor on Tottenham Borough Council between 1958 and 1961, and from 1962 to 1963.

== Political career ==
Deakins was unsuccessful in his first three attempts to be elected a Member of Parliament (MP), including in Finchley in 1959 against future Prime Minister Margaret Thatcher (who entered the House of Commons on her own third attempt), and Chigwell in 1966. However, he was later elected MP for Walthamstow West in 1970, reversing his by-election loss to the Conservatives of that seat in 1967.

He gave his maiden speech on 16 July 1970. Speaking in favour of the second reading of the Misuse of Drugs Bill, he raised a series of reservations: "It attacks socially unacceptable drugs but does nothing about socially acceptable drugs."

After boundary changes in 1974, Walthamstow West was merged into the new constituency of Walthamstow, which he continued to represent.

During the Labour government of 1974–1979, under Harold Wilson and James Callaghan, Deakins was a junior minister for Trade (1974–1976) and the Department of Health and Social Security (1976–1979). He represented Walthamstow until he was defeated at the 1987 general election, gaining 34% of the vote compared to the 39% polled by his Conservative opponent Hugo Summerson. His defeat was against the national trend, but seemed to some political observers to follow a rates increase by the Labour-controlled Waltham Forest London Borough Council. As of 2021, this is the last time that the Labour Party has not won Walthamstow.

== Personal life ==
Outside politics, his interests are writing, cinema, yoga and football. In 1990, he married Sandra Weaver; they have a son and two daughters. He lives in Camden Town, north west London.

== Publications ==
- A Faith to Fight For, 1964
- You And Your Member Of Parliament (with Nance Fyson), 1987
- What Future for Labour?, 1988

== Notes ==
Parliament of the United Kingdom
| Preceded by Fred Silvester | Member of Parliament for Walthamstow West; 1970 – February 1974 | Constituency abolished |
| New constituency | Member of Parliament for Walthamstow; February 1974 – 1987 | Succeeded by Hugo Summerson |
