= Lady Clare Annesley =

British pacifist and socialist activist (1893–1980)

- Born: 30 June 1893; Castlewellan, County Down, Northern Ireland
- Died: 7 August 1980 (aged 87)
- Occupation: Socialist activist

Lady Clare Annesley (30 June 1893 – 7 August 1980) was a British pacifist and socialist activist.

== Life and career ==
Born at Castlewellan, Lady Clare was the daughter of Hugh Annesley, 5th Earl Annesley and Priscilla Cecilia Armytage Moore. Her father was already 61 years old when she was born.

Annesley attended the Slade School of Art. She became active in social work in the East End of London, and in the suffrage movement, alongside her sister, Constance Malleson. This inspired her to join the Independent Labour Party in 1915. She also became active in the Union of Democratic Control and the Women's International League, with the main focus of her activity being pacifism. She also campaigned for vegetarianism, and against the hunting of animals and wearing of furs.

Annesley stood for election as a Labour Party candidate on three occasions: in Bristol West at a by-election in 1928, and the 1929 general election, then in Bedford at the 1931 general election, but was never elected. In 1931, she also stood in the Victoria ward of Westminster City Council, but was not elected.

In later life, Annesley was a member of the Fellowship Party.
