= Same-roof rule =

The "same-roof rule" was a rule of English law that victims of domestic abuse are not entitled to compensation if they lived with the perpetrator prior to 1979. The rule was successfully challenged in the Court of Appeal in 2018.

== See also ==
- Criminal Injuries Compensation Scheme
