= Oliver Stanley =

British politician (1896–1950)

The Right Honourable Oliver Stanley MC
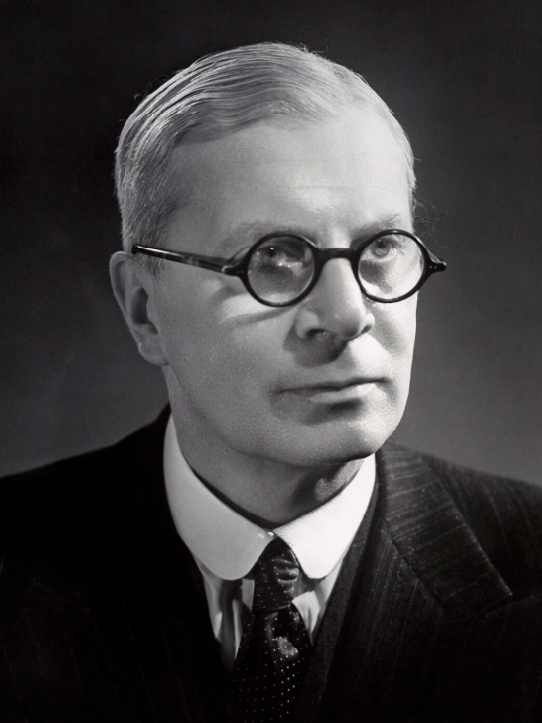
- Stanley in 1944

Member of the British Parliament for Bristol West
- In office 6 July 1945 – 10 December 1950
- Preceded by: Cyril Culverwell
- Succeeded by: Sir Walter Monckton

Secretary of State for the Colonies
- In office 22 November 1942 – 26 July 1945
- Monarch: George VI
- Prime Minister: Winston Churchill
- Preceded by: Viscount Cranborne
- Succeeded by: George Hall

Secretary of State for War
- In office 5 January 1940 – 11 May 1940
- Monarch: George VI
- Prime Minister: Neville Chamberlain
- Preceded by: Leslie Hore-Belisha
- Succeeded by: Anthony Eden

President of the Board of Trade
- In office 28 May 1937 – 5 January 1940
- Monarch: George VI
- Prime Minister: Neville Chamberlain
- Preceded by: Walter Runciman
- Succeeded by: Sir Andrew Duncan

Minister of Transport
- In office 22 February 1933 – 29 June 1934
- Monarch: George V
- Prime Minister: Ramsay MacDonald
- Preceded by: John Pybus
- Succeeded by: Leslie Hore-Belisha

Member of the British Parliament for Westmorland
- In office 30 October 1924 – 5 July 1945
- Preceded by: Sir John Weston
- Succeeded by: William Fletcher-Vane

Personal details
- Born: 4 May 1896 London, England, UK
- Died: 10 December 1950 (aged 54) Sulhamstead, Berkshire, England, UK
- Party: Conservative
- Spouse: Maureen Vane-Tempest-Stewart (m. 1920; died 1942)
- Children: 2
- Parent(s): Edward Stanley, 17th Earl of Derby; Lady Alice Montagu
- Education: Eton College
- Profession: Barrister

Oliver Frederick George Stanley (4 May 1896 – 10 December 1950) was a prominent British Conservative politician who held many ministerial posts before his early death.

== Background and education ==
Stanley was the second son of Edward Stanley, 17th Earl of Derby, by his wife Lady Alice, daughter of William Montagu, 7th Duke of Manchester. Edward Stanley, Lord Stanley, was his elder brother. He was educated at Eton, but did not proceed to the University of Oxford due to the outbreak of the First World War.

== Military career ==
During the First World War, Stanley was commissioned into the Lancashire Hussars, before transferring to the Royal Field Artillery in 1915. He achieved the rank of captain, and won both the Military Cross and the Croix de Guerre.

== Political career ==
After he was demobilised, Stanley was called to the bar by Gray's Inn in 1919. In the 1924 general election he was elected as Member of Parliament (MP) for Westmorland. From 1945 he sat for Bristol West.

=== Ministerial career ===
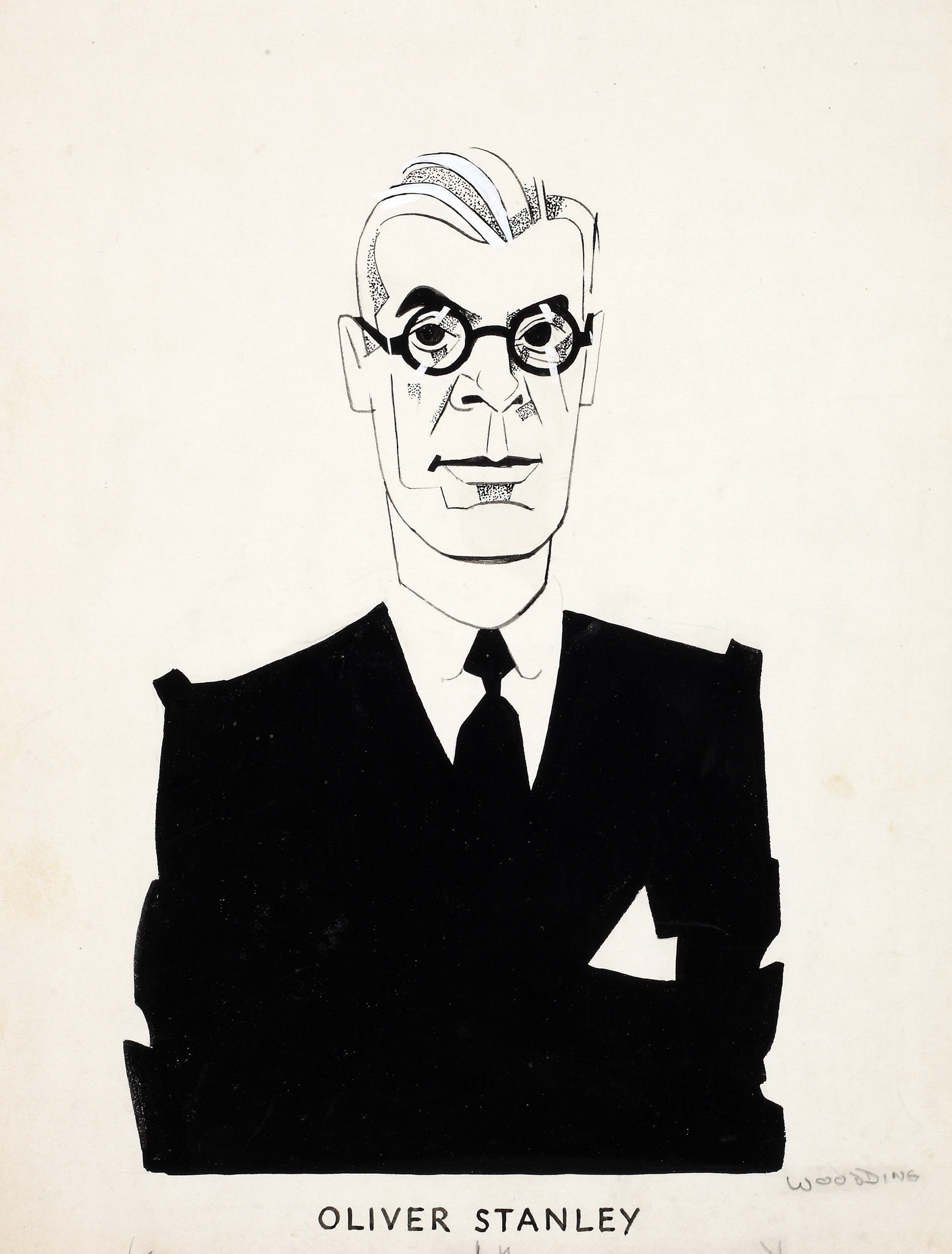
Caricature of Stanley believed to have been drawn between 1939 and 1946

He soon came to the attention of the Conservative leaders and held a number of posts in the National Government of the 1930s. As Minister of Transport he was responsible for the introduction of a 30 miles per hour speed limit and driving tests for new drivers. In May 1938 whilst President of the Board of Trade he achieved a rare distinction in British politics when his brother Lord Stanley became Secretary of State for Dominion Affairs – a rare example of two brothers sitting in the same Cabinet, more so as their father, a former Conservative minister, was still alive. However, Edward died five months later. (Another example is that of two Labour Party brothers, David Miliband and his brother Ed Miliband, who were appointed to the British Cabinet in June 2007.)

In January 1940 Stanley was appointed Secretary of State for War after the previous incumbent, Leslie Hore-Belisha, had been sacked after falling out with the leading officers. Much was expected of Stanley's tenure in this office, for his father had held it during the First World War, but four months later the government fell, and Stanley was replaced by Anthony Eden. Churchill offered Stanley the Dominions Office, which Stanley turned down. Instead, Churchill made him a personal link with intelligence agencies, notably as founder of the London Controlling Section. Two years later Stanley's political fortunes revived when Churchill appointed him Secretary of State for the Colonies, a post which he held until the end of the war.

=== Last years ===
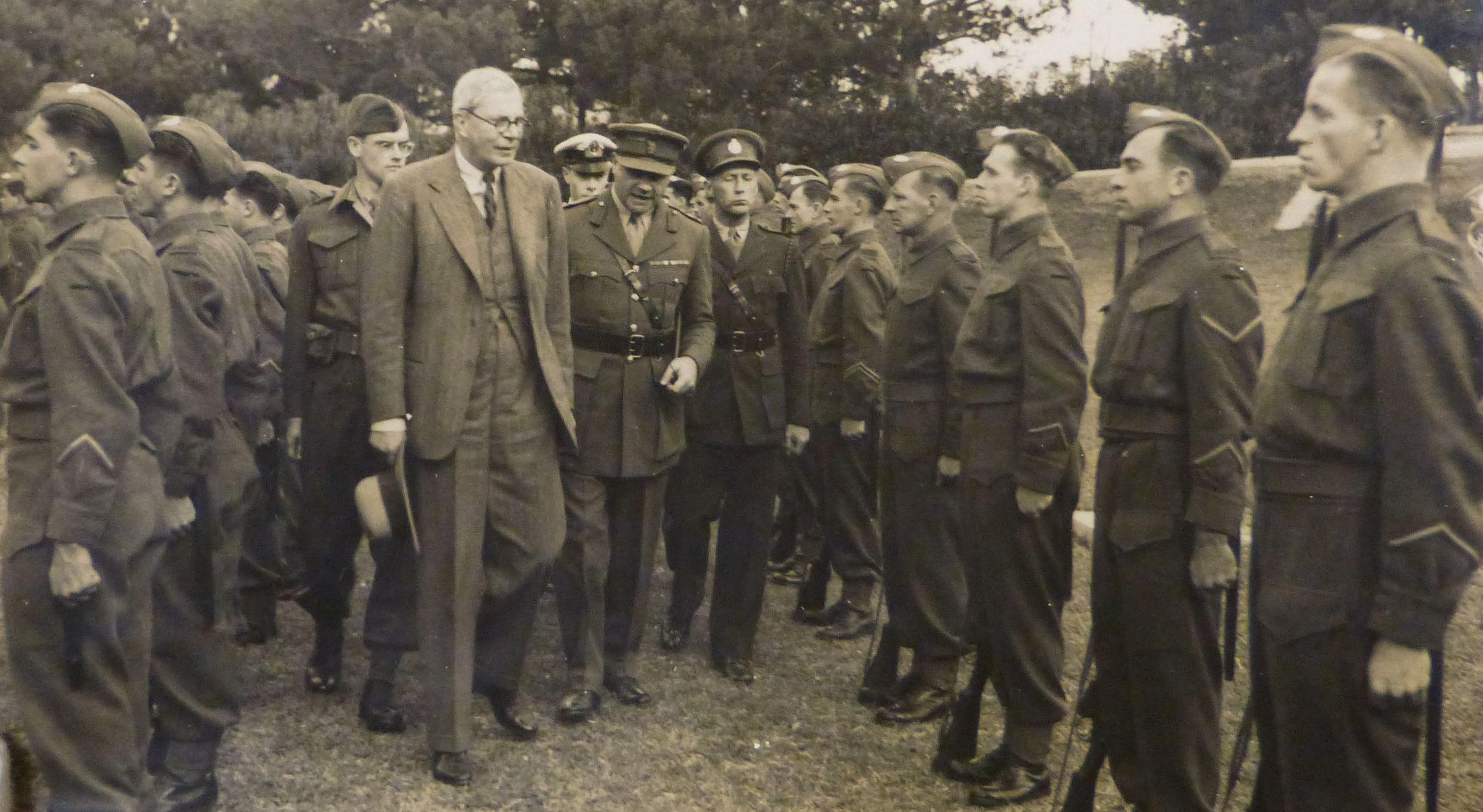
Oliver Stanley inspects the Bermuda Volunteer Rifle Corps at the Imperial Fortress of Bermuda, 30th December, 1944.

After the Conservatives' massive defeat in the 1945 general election Stanley was prominent amongst those rebuilding the party, and he came to be regarded as one of the most important Conservative MPs. He was a governor of The Peckham Experiment in 1949. Along with Churchill and Anthony Eden, Stanley was seen as one of the Conservative Party's leaders in 1950. He succeeded his father as Chancellor of the University of Liverpool. By this time, however, his health was in decline; and he died on 10 December 1950 at his home in Sulhamstead.

Stanley had been Chairman of the Conservative Finance Committee. Had he lived longer, he might well have been appointed Chancellor of the Exchequer when the Conservatives formed a government the following year. Rab Butler was appointed instead. Butler later wrote in his 1971 memoirs that Oliver Stanley was "the acutest brain on the Conservative front bench, the keenest lance I have ever known in politics, and a flowing pen which could [write] several pages of immaculate foolscap in the same time that lesser men would take to wrote a decent paragraph". However, Butler’s view was that he probably would not have been a great Prime Minister or even Chancellor of the Exchequer, as he was too indecisive, but that he was great in opposition.

Historian Sir Charles Petrie went further, and argued in his 1972 memoirs (A Historian Looks At His World) that "the greatest blow the Conservative Party has sustained since the late war was the premature death of Oliver Stanley. He was one of the most gifted men of the century, and would have made a very great Prime Minister. ... He was as brilliant a conversationalist as a public speaker."

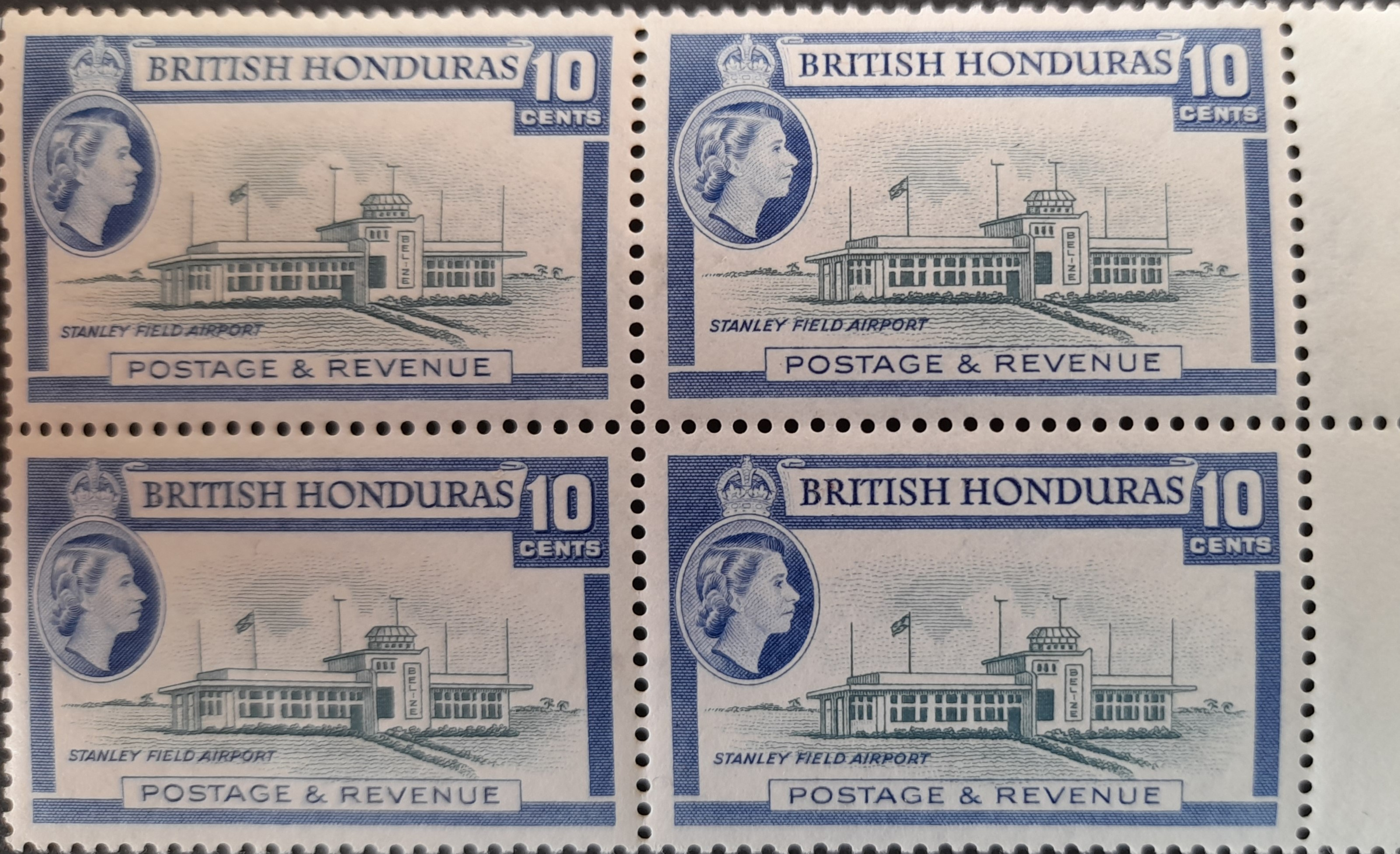
Stanley Field Airport, Belize 10 Cents British Honduras Queen Elizabeth stamps.

Its believed Stanley Field Airport, Belize was named in honour of Stanley as Secretary of State for the Colonies and is commemorated of British Honduras Queen Elizabeth II stamps.

== Family ==
Stanley married Lady Maureen Vane-Tempest-Stewart, daughter of Charles Vane-Tempest-Stewart, 7th Marquess of Londonderry, and the Hon. Edith Chaplin, in 1920. They had one son and one daughter:

- Michael Charles Stanley (1921–1990), who married (Aileen) Fortune Constance Hugh Smith and had two sons; and
- Kathryn Edith Helen Stanley (1923–2004), Lady-in-Waiting to Queen Elizabeth II from 1955 to 2002, and who married Sir John Dugdale (1923–1994) and had two daughters and two sons.

Lady Maureen died in June 1942, aged 41. Stanley survived her by eight years and died in December 1950, aged 54.

== Books cited ==
- Butler, Rab (1971). The Art of the Possible. London: Hamish Hamilton. ISBN 978-0241020074., his autobiography
- Howard, Anthony RAB: The Life of R. A. Butler, Jonathan Cape 1987 ISBN 978-0224018623
- Jago, Michael Rab Butler: The Best Prime Minister We Never Had?, Biteback Publishing 2015 ISBN 978-1849549202

Parliament of the United Kingdom
Preceded by John Weston	Member of Parliament for Westmorland; 1924–1945	Succeeded by William Fletcher-Vane
Preceded by Cyril Culverwell	Member of Parliament for Bristol West; 1945–1950	Succeeded by Walter Monckton
Political offices
Preceded by Alfred Short	Parliamentary Under-Secretary of State for the Home Department; 1931-1933	Succeeded by Douglas Hacking
Preceded by John Pybus	Minister of Transport; 1933–1934	Succeeded by Leslie Hore-Belisha
Preceded by Henry Betterton	Minister of Labour; 1934–1935	Succeeded by Ernest Brown
Preceded by Walter Runciman	President of the Board of Trade; 1937–1940	Succeeded by Andrew Duncan
Preceded by The Viscount Halifax	President of the Board of Education; 1935–1937	Succeeded by The Earl Stanhope
Preceded by Leslie Hore-Belisha	Secretary of State for War; 1940	Succeeded by Anthony Eden
Preceded by Viscount Cranborne	Secretary of State for the Colonies; 1942–1945	Succeeded by George Hall
