= Thomas Watts (1868–1951) =

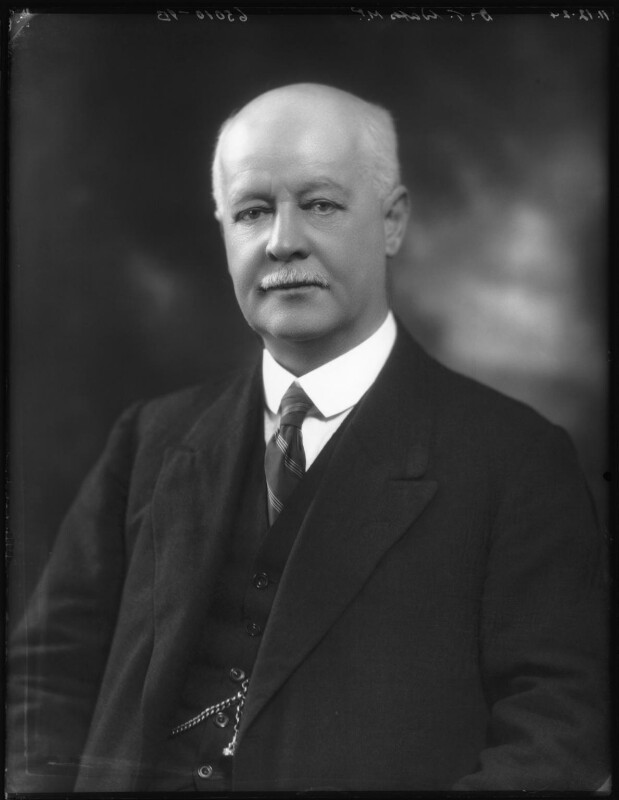
Watts in 1924

Sir Thomas Watts (1 July 1868 – 3 June 1951) was a Conservative Party politician in the United Kingdom.

A medical doctor by profession, Watts studied at the Durham University College of Medicine (B.S., 1889; M.D., 1892).

He was member of parliament (MP) for Manchester Withington from 1922 to 1923, and from 1924 to 1929. He was knighted in 1928 Birthday Honours, for political and public services.

Parliament of the United Kingdom
Preceded by Alfred Deakin Carter	Member of Parliament for Manchester Withington; 1922–1923	Succeeded by Ernest Simon
Preceded by Ernest Simon	Member of Parliament for Manchester Withington; 1924–1929	Succeeded by Edward Fleming
