= Thomas Watt =

Thomas Watt may refer to:

- Thomas Watt (politician), South African politician
- Tom Watt (ice hockey), Canadian ice hockey scout and coach
- Tom Watt (actor), English actor, writer and broadcaster
- Tommy Watt, Scottish jazz bandleader
- Thomas Watt, prosecution witness, see Kenneth Littlejohn

== See also ==
- Thomas Watts (disambiguation)
- Thomas Watt Gregory
- Thomas Watt Hamilton
