= Keith Bradley, Baron Bradley =

British Labour Party politician and life peer (born 1950)

The Right Honourable The Lord Bradley PC
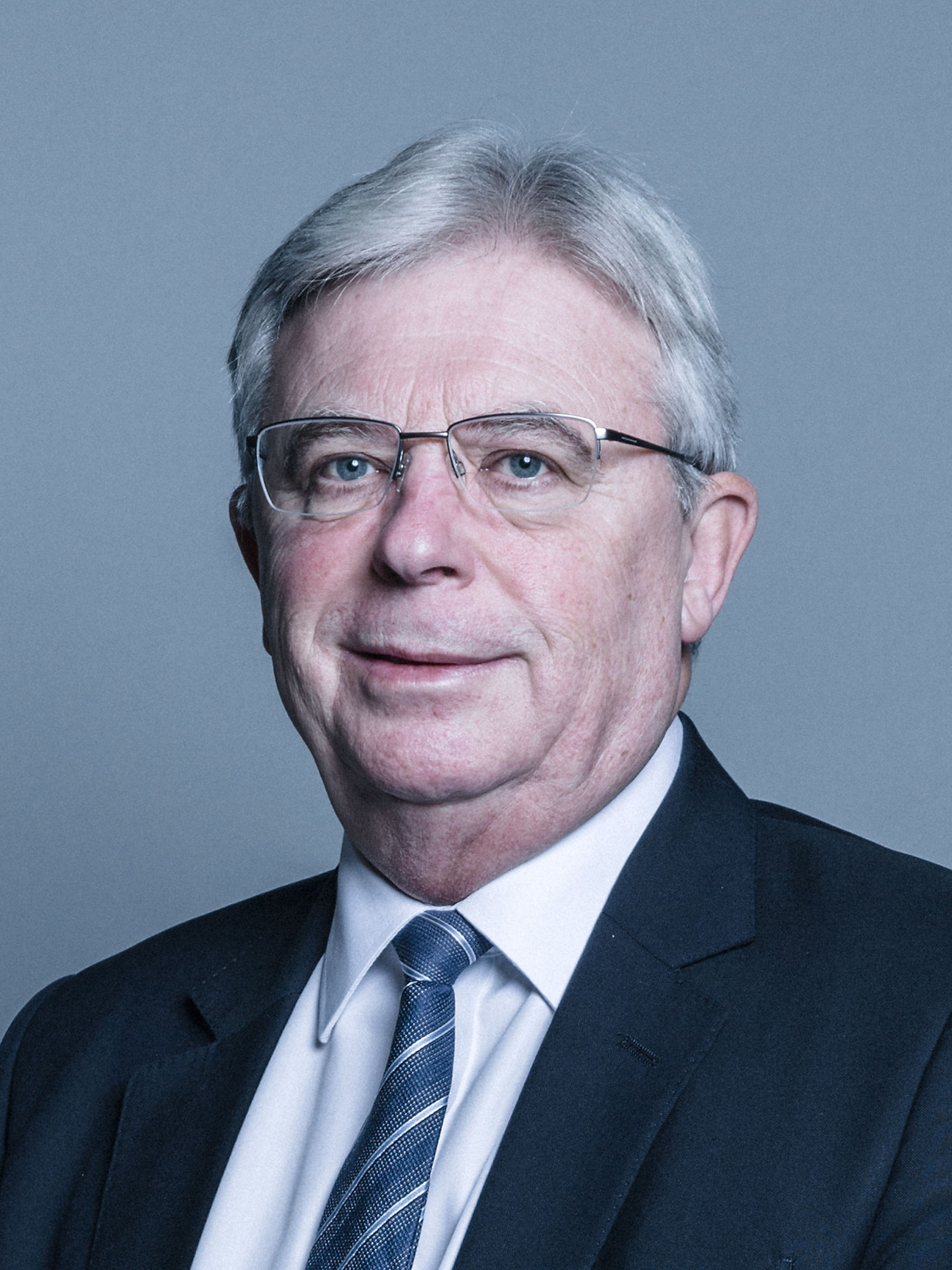
- Official portrait, 2018

Minister of State for Prisons
- In office 8 June 2001 – 28 May 2002
- Prime Minister: Tony Blair
- Preceded by: Charles Clarke
- Succeeded by: Hilary Benn

Deputy Chief Whip in the House of Commons Treasurer of the Household
- In office 27 July 1998 – 8 June 2001
- Prime Minister: Tony Blair
- Preceded by: George Mudie
- Succeeded by: Keith Hill

Parliamentary Under-Secretary of State for Social Security
- In office 2 May 1997 – 27 July 1998
- Prime Minister: Tony Blair
- Preceded by: Oliver Heald
- Succeeded by: Angela Eagle

Member of the House of Lords
- Lord Temporal
- Life peerage 12 June 2006

Member of Parliament for Manchester Withington
- In office 11 June 1987 – 11 April 2005
- Preceded by: Fred Silvester
- Succeeded by: John Leech

Personal details
- Born: 17 May 1950 (age 76) Birmingham, England
- Party: Labour
- Education: Aston University, University of York, Manchester Metropolitan University

Keith John Charles Bradley, Baron Bradley, PC (born 17 May 1950) is a British Labour Party politician and life peer. He was formerly the Labour Member of Parliament (MP) for Manchester Withington from 1987 until 2005.

== Early life ==
He went to Bishop Vesey's Grammar School in Sutton Coldfield. He studied at Aston University, gaining a DipAcct in 1970. From Manchester Polytechnic (now Manchester Metropolitan University), he gained a BA in Social Science in 1976. From the University of York, he gained an MPhil in 1978.

He worked for the chartered accountants Charles Impey & Co from 1969 to 1973. He was a research officer for Manchester City Council Housing Department from 1978 to 1981. From 1981 to 1987, he was Secretary of Stockport Community Health Council.

== Parliamentary career ==
He was first elected as Member of Parliament (MP) for the constituency at the 1987 general election, having served as a councillor in Old Moat ward (Manchester) since 1983. Following the 1997 general election he became a junior minister at the Department of Social Security, and then became Deputy Chief Whip and Treasurer of the Queen's Household in 1998. He was a junior minister in the Home Office for Criminal Justice, Sentencing, and Law Reform from 2001 to 2002, and then a backbench MP and member of the Health Select Committee. He is a member of the Privy Council. Bradley lost his seat in Parliament when he was defeated by a swing of over 17% to the Liberal Democrat candidate, John Leech, in the 2005 general election.

In April 2006 it was announced that Keith Bradley would become a working life peer in the House of Lords, and he became Baron Bradley, of Withington in the County of Greater Manchester on 12 June 2006. Lord Bradley is also a Special Adviser to the President and Vice-Chancellor of the University of Manchester.

In October 2006 it was announced that Keith Bradley had been appointed to the board of The Christie Hospital as a non executive director. He was appointed Chair of the Trust in May 2011. In February 2014 he announced that he would resign from the board as a consequences of disagreements about the way in which the suspension of the Chief Executive was being handled.

== Personal life ==
Lord Bradley and his wife, Rhona Bradley, have two sons (Matthew and Jonathan) and a daughter (Rebecca). He married Rhona Ann Graham in 1987. He was criticized for sending Jonathan to Manchester Grammar School. His sister, Sally Bradley and her partner William (Billy) Harrop, were killed on Sunday 21 April during breakfast at one of the Hotels in the 2019 Sri Lanka Easter bombings.

Parliament of the United Kingdom
Preceded by Fred Silvester	Member of Parliament for Manchester Withington; 1987–2005	Succeeded by John Leech
Political offices
Preceded by George Mudie	Treasurer of the Household (Deputy Chief Whip); 1998–2001	Succeeded by Keith Hill
Party political offices
Preceded by George Mudie	Labour Deputy Chief Whip in the House of Commons; 1998–2001	Succeeded by Keith Hill
Orders of precedence in the United Kingdom
Preceded by The Lord James of Blackheath	Gentlemen; Baron Bradley	Followed by The Lord Browne of Belmont
