= 1967 Walthamstow West by-election =

Historical election in the UK

The 1967 Walthamstow West by-election of 21 September 1967 was held after the death of Labour Member of Parliament (MP) Ted Redhead on 15 April of that year. The seat was gained by the Conservative Party by just 62 votes.

== Result ==
Walthamstow West by-election, 1967
Party	Candidate	Votes	%	±%
Conservative	Frederick Silvester	6,652	37.05	+12.27
Labour	Eric Deakins	6,590	36.71	−24.46
Liberal	Margaret Wingfield	4,105	22.87	+8.81
Anti-Common Market	Oliver Smedley	542	3.02	New
Independent	Robin Allen	63	0.35	New
Majority		62	0.34	N/A
Turnout		17,952		
Conservative gain from Labour		Swing		

The election was held on the same day as the Cambridge by-election, where the Conservatives also gained a seat held by Labour, however at Cambridge the swing between the two parties was 8.6% compared with the 18.4% swing to the Conservatives at Walthamstow West. The Walthamstow West result was also significant as Labour had held the seat since 1929, and it had formerly been the seat of Labour Prime Minister Clement Attlee. An editorial in The Glasgow Herald the day after the result said that while the Cambridge result was "always expected" the Conservative victory in Walthamstow "almost defies belief" given that the Labour Party had held the seat during its crushing national defeat in 1931.
