= Cyril Culverwell =

British politician (1895–1963)

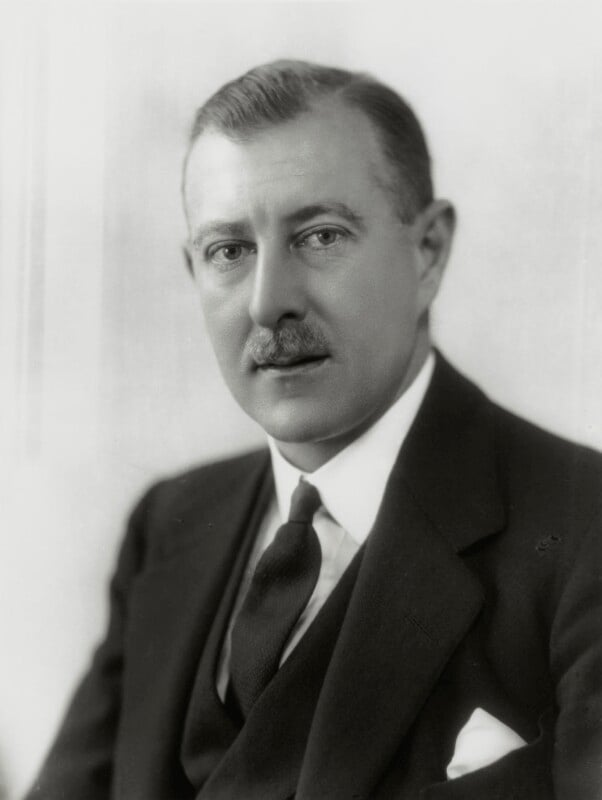
Culverwell in 1929

Cyril Thomas Culverwell (22 October 1895 – 29 October 1963) was a British Conservative Party politician.

He was elected at a by-election in February 1928 as the Member of Parliament (MP) for Bristol West. He was re-elected at the next three elections, holding the seat until the 1945 general election, which he did not contest.

In 1938, Culverwell caused controversy by writing an article for the Bristol Evening Post of 7 November 1938, which praised Nazi Germany. In November 1939, Culverwell drew further criticism when he called for "peace by negotiation" with Nazi Germany, arguing that the continuation of the war would strengthen the Soviet Union. Culverwell added that "I can even visualise our troops fighting side by side with the Germans to defeat the Bolshevist menace."

Parliament of the United Kingdom
Preceded by George Gibbs	Member of Parliament for Bristol West; 1928 – 1945	Succeeded by Oliver Stanley
