= List of deaths of candidates during general elections of the United Kingdom =

There have been ten instances of a death of a candidate during a British general election since 1918 (the first election in which all constituencies in the United Kingdom voted on the same day).

The rules governing the procedure for dealing with the death of a candidate occur in the Representation of the People Act 1983. Unless the deceased candidate was standing as an independent, their death results in the election being postponed whether it is a general election or a by-election. The poll is stopped immediately even if voting has closed and the votes are being counted, unless the death occurs after the declaration of the result.

The Returning Officer must be shown proof of the death; a new election is then arranged for 28 days after this date. The time at which the Returning Officer hears of the death is the relevant factor not the date of the death itself. There is no requirement for other nominated candidates to re-register, a new candidate may be nominated by the party of the deceased and any of the other candidates may at this point withdraw from the election, but independent candidates and candidates for other parties cannot be nominated.

According to the Electoral Commission, if the deceased candidate was standing as an independent, the election continues as normal. The Speaker of the House of Commons seeking re-election is treated effectively as if he were standing for a party, except that in this case other candidates may be nominated by any party or as independents as the proceedings begin afresh.

Under all circumstances the deposit will be returned to the estate of the deceased candidate. In the unlikely event that a deceased independent candidate wins, the election is re-held with no new candidates and all deposits are returned. If it is a tie between a deceased independent candidate and one or more living candidates, the deceased candidate is ignored.

In the 2015 general election, former Eurovision singer Ronnie Carroll, who was standing in the Hampstead and Kilburn constituency as an independent candidate, died on 13 April 2015. As he was an independent, the poll was not cancelled and proceeded with his name on the ballot paper. He gained 113 votes and sixth place in poll.

== Deaths during elections since 1900 ==
| Name | Election | Party | Date of death | Days before election | Age | Constituency | References |
|---|---|---|---|---|---|---|---|
| Francis Lucas | 1918 | Conservative | 9 December 1918 | 3 | 68 | Lambeth, Kennington | |
| Charles Frederick White | 1923 | Liberal | 4 December 1923 | 2 | 60 | Derbyshire, West | |
| H. Yates | 1929 | Labour | 27 May 1929 | 3 | | Rugby | |
| Walter Windsor^{*} | 1945 | Labour | 30 June 1945 | 6 | 61 | Kingston upon Hull Central | |
| Edward Fleming^{*} | 1950 | Conservative | 17 February 1950 | 6 | 59 | Manchester Moss Side | |
| Frank Collindridge^{*} | 1951 | Labour | 16 October 1951 | 9 | 60 | Barnsley | |
| Jo Harrison | 2005 | Liberal Democrat | 29 April 2005 | 5 | 53 | South Staffordshire | |
| John Boakes | 2010 | UKIP | 22 April 2010 | 14 | 63 | Thirsk and Malton | |
| Ronnie Carroll | 2015 | Independent | 13 April 2015 | 24 | 80 | Hampstead and Kilburn | |
| Anthony Watchorn | 2019 | Independent | 26 November 2019 | 16 | 69 | Rutland and Melton | |

notes: ^{*}= likely winner, had they lived. Replacement won in their place.

== Bibliography ==
Notes

References

- BBC News (22 April 2010). "Thirsk and Malton candidate death delays poll date". BBC News.
- BBC News Team (8 May 2015). "Ronnie Carroll: 113 vote for former Eurovision singer and election candidate who died in April". BBC News.
- Rallings, Colin; Thrasher, Michael (2007). British electoral facts, 1832-2006 (2007 ed.). Ashgate Publishing, Ltd. ISBN 978-0-7546-2712-8. - Total pages: 298
- Stead, Mark (23 April 2010). "Thirsk and Malton election postponed after candidate John Boakes dies". Gazette and Herald.
- Tingle, Len (23 April 2010). "Election cancelled in Thirsk and Malton". BBC News.
