= Margaret Wingfield =

British Liberal Party politician

Margaret Wingfield CBE
- Margaret Wingfield CBE

Personal details
- Born: 9 January 1912 Surrey, England
- Died: 6 April 2002 (aged 90) Kingston on Thames, England
- Occupation: President, Liberal Party (UK); President, National Council for Women

Margaret Elizabeth Wingfield CBE (19 January 1912 – 6 April 2002) was a British Liberal Party politician and President of the Liberal Party from 1975 to 1976.

== Background ==
Wingfield was educated at Freiburg University and the London School of Economics. She was a social worker and housewife. She was the niece of the Liberal Member of Parliament (MP) Charles McCurdy. Her granddaughter is Carita Ogden, who was a Liberal Democrat Councillor in the London Borough of Lambeth.

== Political career ==
Wingfield was active internally with the Liberal Party. She served on the Liberal Party Council from 1962. She was an executive member, of the British Group of Liberal International. She was Chairman of the Liberal Party social security panel. She was President of the Liberal Party from 1975 to 1976. Her term of office coincided with the time of the revelations about party leader, Jeremy Thorpe's private life and his subsequent resignation.

Wingfield also stood as a Liberal candidate for public office. She stood as a candidate in Putney at the 1961 London County Council election. She also stood four times for parliament; for Wokingham in 1964 and 1966, at the 1967 Walthamstow West by-election and for Chippenham in 1970.

Party political offices
Preceded by Arthur Holt	President of the Liberal Party; 1975–1976	Succeeded by Basil Goldstone
Non-profit organization positions
Preceded by Diane Reid	President of the National Council of Women of Great Britain; 1980–1984	Succeeded by Mary Mayne
