= Manchester Withington =

Parliamentary constituency in the United Kingdom, 1918 onwards

Coordinates: 53.433°N 2.234°W

Manchester, Withington
- Borough constituency for the House of Commons
- Interactive map of boundaries since 2024
- Location within North West England
- County: Greater Manchester
- Electorate: 71,614 (March 2020)
- Major settlements: Chorlton, Didsbury, Withington

Current constituency
- Created: 1918
- Member of Parliament: Jeff Smith (Labour)
- Seats: One
- Created from: Manchester South and Stretford

Manchester Withington is a constituency (Note: A borough constituency (for the purposes of election expenses and type of returning officer)) represented in the House of Commons of the UK Parliament since 2015 by Jeff Smith of Labour. (Note: As with all constituencies, the constituency elects one Member of Parliament (MP) by the first past the post system of election at least every five years.)

== Constituency profile ==
Manchester Withington is a suburban constituency located in Greater Manchester. It covers neighbourhoods of Manchester around 4 miles (6.4 km) south of the city centre, including Withington, Chorlton-cum-Hardy and Didsbury. Manchester is a major city that grew from textile manufacturing during the Industrial Revolution. The city has undergone strong economic development in the 21st century and is sometimes considered the United Kingdom's "second city".

Didsbury is made up of large houses on leafy roads.

Manchester Withington is the wealthiest of Manchester's constituencies; there is some deprivation in Withington but the rest of the constituency is generally affluent, especially in Didsbury. The constituency has a large student and graduate population due to its location close to the University of Manchester's Fallowfield Campus. Much of the area was developed during the Victorian era to house the growing city's middle-class residents and contains leafy suburbs and many large detached and semi-detached properties. House prices here are higher than the national average and considerably higher than the rest of North West England.

Residents of Manchester Withington are generally young and well-educated. Few residents are married and the homeownership rate is low, however household income is high and many residents work in professional occupations, particularly in the health and property sectors. Rates of unemployment and child poverty are lower than the rest of the region. White people made up 72% of the population at the 2021 census, including a large Irish community. Asians were the largest ethnic minority group at 15%, mostly of Pakistani origin.

The constituency is mostly represented by the Labour Party at the local city council, with some Liberal Democrats in West Didsbury and some Green Party representatives in the constituency's north. Voters in Manchester Withington overwhelmingly supported remaining in the European Union in the 2016 referendum; an estimated 80% voted to remain compared to 48% nationwide, making it the fifth most remain-supporting constituency out of 650 across the United Kingdom according to Electoral Calculus.

== History ==
In the post-war period, Manchester Withington has elected all three major parties. Mostly Conservative before 1987 (with three years of Liberal Party representation near its 1918 inception), it even resisted being gained by Labour in its landslide victories in 1945 and 1966. However, in 1987 the seat turned red for the first time and remained so until 2005 when it was gained by Liberal Democrat John Leech. Leech took the seat with an 18% swing – the largest of the 2005 general election. He retained the seat in 2010, with both of the major parties' losing candidates becoming MPs elsewhere by the next election: Lucy Powell of Labour in Manchester Central in a 2012 by-election, and Conservative Chris Green in Bolton West in 2015.

Amidst a UK-wide collapse in support for the Lib Dems, the seat swung back to Labour in 2015 and in 2017 it became one of the safest Labour seats in the country, with an almost 30,000 majority for Jeff Smith. It was also one of the few seats in England outside London in 2015 where UKIP lost their deposit.

Smith retained the seat in 2019 with a slightly reduced majority, but this was halved in 2024 when a resurgent Green Party jumped from fourth to second place, overtaking the Liberal Democrats, the Conservatives falling to fourth place, narrowly avoiding losing their deposit.

== Boundaries ==
=== Historic ===
Manchester Withington in Lancashire, boundaries used 1974-83

1918–1950: The County Borough of Manchester wards of Chorlton-cum-Hardy, Didsbury, and Withington.

1950–1955: The County Borough of Manchester wards of Rusholme and Withington.

1955–1974: The County Borough of Manchester wards of Barlow Moor, Burnage, Levenshulme, Old Moat, and Withington.

1974–1983: The County Borough of Manchester wards of Barlow Moor, Burnage, Didsbury, Old Moat, and Withington.

1983–2018: The City of Manchester wards of Barlow Moor, Burnage, Chorlton, Didsbury, Old Moat, and Withington.

Map of boundaries 1983-2024

2018–2024: The City of Manchester wards of Burnage (part), Chorlton (part), Chorlton Park (part), Didsbury East, Didsbury West, Old Moat, and Withington.

Following a local government review of ward boundaries which became effective from May 2018, the contents of the constituency were adjusted, but this did not affect its boundaries.

=== Current ===
Further to the 2023 review of Westminster constituencies which came into effect for the 2024 general election, the constituency is composed of the following wards of the City of Manchester (as they existed on 1 December 2020):

- Chorlton; Chorlton Park; Didsbury East; Didsbury West; Old Moat; Withington.

The boundaries were subject to minor changes to align with the revised ward boundaries, with the whole of the Burnage ward being included in new constituency of Gorton and Denton.

== Members of Parliament ==
Election	Member	Party
1918	Alfred Deakin Carter	Unionist
1922	Thomas Watts	Unionist
1923	Ernest Simon	Liberal
1924	Sir Thomas Watts	Unionist
1929	Ernest Simon	Liberal
1931	Edward Fleming	Conservative
1950	Frederick Cundiff	Conservative
1951	Sir Robert Cary	Conservative
Feb 1974	Fred Silvester	Conservative
1987	Keith Bradley	Labour
2005	John Leech	Liberal Democrats
2015	Jeff Smith	Labour

== Elections ==
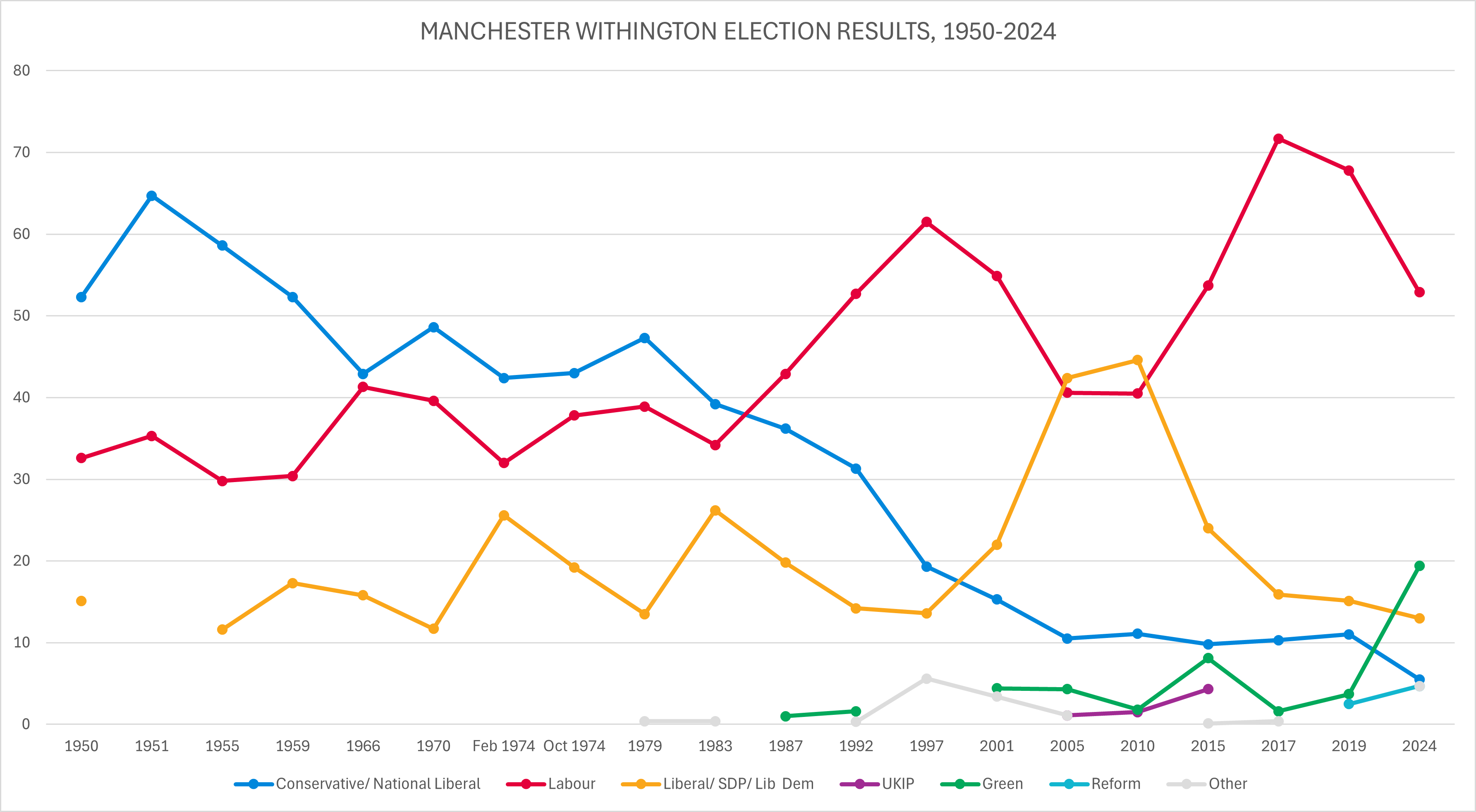
Election results 1983-2024

=== Elections in the 2020s ===
General election 2024: Manchester Withington
Party	Candidate	Votes	%	±%
Labour	Jeff Smith	22,066	52.9	–13.6
Green	Sam Easterby-Smith	8,084	19.4	+15.4
Liberal Democrats	Richard Kilpatrick	5,412	13.0	–2.7
Conservative	Sarah Garcia de Bustos	2,280	5.5	–5.8
Reform	Kaine Williams	1,961	4.7	+2.2
Workers Party	Lizzie Greenwood	1,774	4.3	N/A
SDP	Wendy Andrew	154	0.4	N/A
Majority		13,982	33.5	–17.3
Turnout		41,731	59.2	–10.3
Registered electors		70,549		
Labour hold		Swing	▼14.5	

=== Elections in the 2010s ===
2019 notional result
Party	Vote	%
Labour	33,100	66.5
Liberal Democrats	7,803	15.7
Conservative	5,607	11.3
Green	2,015	4.0
Brexit Party	1,269	2.5
Turnout	49,794	69.5
Electorate	71,614	

General election 2019: Manchester Withington
Party	Candidate	Votes	%	±%
Labour	Jeff Smith	35,902	67.8	–3.9
Liberal Democrats	John Leech	7,997	15.1	–0.8
Conservative	Shengke Zhi	5,820	11.0	+0.7
Green	Lucy Bannister	1,968	3.7	+2.1
Brexit Party	Stephen Ward	1,308	2.5	N/A
Majority		27,905	52.7	–3.1
Turnout		52,995	69.5	–2.4
Labour hold		Swing	–1.6	

General election 2017: Manchester Withington
Party	Candidate	Votes	%	±%
Labour	Jeff Smith	38,424	71.7	+18.0
Liberal Democrats	John Leech	8,549	15.9	−8.1
Conservative	Sarah Heald	5,530	10.3	+0.5
Green	Laura Bannister	865	1.6	−6.5
Women's Equality	Sally Carr	234	0.4	N/A
Majority		29,875	55.8	+26.1
Turnout		53,602	71.9	+4.4
Labour hold		Swing	+13.0	

General election 2015: Manchester Withington
Party	Candidate	Votes	%	±%
Labour	Jeff Smith	26,843	53.7	+13.2
Liberal Democrats	John Leech	11,970	24.0	−20.6
Conservative	Robert Manning	4,872	9.8	−1.3
Green	Lucy Bannister	4,048	8.1	+6.3
UKIP	Mark Davies	2,172	4.3	+2.8
Independent	Marcus Farmer	61	0.1	0.0
Majority		14,873	29.7	N/A
Turnout		49,966	67.5	+5.3
Labour gain from Liberal Democrats		Swing	+17.0	

General election 2010: Manchester Withington
Party	Candidate	Votes	%	±%
Liberal Democrats	John Leech	20,110	44.6	▲2.2
Labour	Lucy Powell	18,260	40.5	▼0.1
Conservative	Chris Green	5,005	11.1	▲0.6
Green	Brian A. Candeland	798	1.8	▼2.5
UKIP	Robert Gutfreund-Walmsley	698	1.5	▲0.4
Independent	Yasmin Zalzala	147	0.3	▼0.1
Independent	Marcus Farmer	57	0.1	N/A
Majority		1,850	4.1	▲2.3
Turnout		45,075	62.2	▲6.8
Liberal Democrats hold		Swing	▲1.4	

=== Elections in the 2000s ===
General election 2005: Manchester Withington
Party	Candidate	Votes	%	±%
Liberal Democrats	John Leech	15,872	42.4	+20.4
Labour	Keith Bradley	15,205	40.6	−14.3
Conservative	Karen Bradley	3,919	10.5	−4.8
Green	Brian A. Candeland	1,595	4.3	−0.1
UKIP	Robert Gutfreund-Walmsley	424	1.1	N/A
Independent	Ivan Benett	243	0.6	N/A
Independent	Yasmin Zalzala	152	0.4	N/A
Their Party	Richard Reed	47	0.1	N/A
Majority		667	1.8	N/A
Turnout		37,457	55.3	+3.4
Liberal Democrats gain from Labour		Swing	+17.3	

General election 2001: Manchester Withington
Party	Candidate	Votes	%	±%
Labour	Keith Bradley	19,239	54.9	−6.6
Liberal Democrats	Yasmin Zalzala	7,715	22.0	+8.4
Conservative	Julian Samways	5,349	15.3	−4.0
Green	Michelle Valentine	1,539	4.4	N/A
Socialist Alliance	John Clegg	1,208	3.4	N/A
Majority		11,524	32.9	−9.3
Turnout		35,050	51.9	−13.9
Labour hold		Swing		

=== Elections in the 1990s ===
General election 1997: Manchester Withington
Party	Candidate	Votes	%	±%
Labour	Keith Bradley	27,103	61.5	+8.8
Conservative	Jonathan M. Smith	8,522	19.3	−12.0
Liberal Democrats	Yasmin Zalzala	6,000	13.6	−0.6
Referendum	Mark B.B. Sheppard	1,079	2.5	N/A
ProLife Alliance	Simon P. Caldwell	614	1.4	N/A
Socialist	Julie White	376	0.9	N/A
Rainbow Dream Ticket	Stephen Kingston	181	0.4	N/A
Natural Law	Mark E.J. Gaskell	152	0.4	+0.1
Majority		18,581	42.2	+20.8
Turnout		44,027	65.8	−5.5
Labour hold		Swing	+10.4	

General election 1992: Manchester Withington
Party	Candidate	Votes	%	±%
Labour	Keith Bradley	23,962	52.7	+9.8
Conservative	Eric N. Farthing	14,227	31.3	−4.9
Liberal Democrats	Gordon Hennell	6,457	14.2	−5.6
Green	Brian A. Candeland	725	1.6	+0.6
Natural Law	Clive E. Menhinick	128	0.3	N/A
Majority		9,735	21.4	+14.7
Turnout		45,499	71.3	−5.8
Labour hold		Swing	+7.3	

=== Elections in the 1980s ===
General election 1987: Manchester Withington
Party	Candidate	Votes	%	±%
Labour	Keith Bradley	21,650	42.9	+8.7
Conservative	Fred Silvester	18,259	36.2	−3.0
Liberal	Audrey Jones	9,978	19.8	−6.4
Green	Michael Abberton	524	1.0	N/A
Majority		3,391	6.7	N/A
Turnout		50,411	77.1	+4.8
Labour gain from Conservative		Swing	+5.9	

General election 1983: Manchester Withington
Party	Candidate	Votes	%	±%
Conservative	Fred Silvester	18,329	39.2	−8.1
Labour	Frances Done	15,956	34.2	−4.7
SDP	Bernard L. Lever	12,231	26.2	N/A
Independent	Michael Gibson	184	0.4	0.0
Majority		2,373	5.0	−3.4
Turnout		46,700	72.3	−2.4
Conservative hold		Swing	−3.4	

=== Elections in the 1970s ===
General election 1979: Manchester Withington
Party	Candidate	Votes	%	±%
Conservative	Fred Silvester	18,862	47.3	+4.3
Labour	Geoffrey Hodgson	15,510	38.9	+1.1
Liberal	John T. Mitchell	5,387	13.5	−5.7
Independent	Michael George Gibson	157	0.4	N/A
Majority		3,352	8.4	+3.3
Turnout		39,916	74.7	+6.9
Conservative hold		Swing	+1.6	

General election October 1974: Manchester Withington
Party	Candidate	Votes	%	±%
Conservative	Fred Silvester	16,937	43.0	+0.6
Labour	Peter J. Hildrew	14,936	37.8	+5.8
Liberal	Nan Davies	7,555	19.2	−6.4
Majority		2,001	5.2	−5.2
Turnout		39,428	67.8	−5.8
Conservative hold		Swing	−2.7	

General election February 1974: Manchester Withington
Party	Candidate	Votes	%	±%
Conservative	Fred Silvester	17,997	42.4	−6.2
Labour	Sholto N.M. Moxley	13,584	32.0	−7.6
Liberal	Ian McWilliam-Fowler	10,877	25.6	+13.9
Majority		4,413	10.39	+1.39
Turnout		42,458	73.6	+5.8
Conservative hold		Swing		

General election 1970: Manchester Withington
Party	Candidate	Votes	%	±%
Conservative	Robert Cary	18,854	48.64	
Labour	Michael Noble	13,365	39.64	
Liberal	James Clarney	4,540	11.71	
Majority		3,489	9.00	
Turnout		36,759	67.84	
Conservative hold		Swing		

=== Elections in the 1960s ===
General election 1966: Manchester Withington
Party	Candidate	Votes	%	±%
Conservative	Robert Cary	16,676	42.92	
Labour	David Clark	16,029	41.25	
Liberal	Geoffrey Vaughan Davies	6,150	15.83	
Majority		647	1.67	
Turnout		38,855	71.18	
Conservative hold		Swing		

General election 1964: Manchester Withington
Party	Candidate	Votes	%	±%
Conservative	Robert Cary	18,259	44.28	
Labour	Keith Openshaw	13,117	31.18	
Liberal	Geoffrey Vaughan Davies	9,860	23.91	
Majority		5,142	13.10	
Turnout		41,236	72.35	
Conservative hold		Swing		

=== Elections in the 1950s ===
General election 1959: Manchester Withington
Party	Candidate	Votes	%	±%
Conservative	Robert Cary	23,170	52.28	
Labour	Robert Sheldon	13,476	30.41	
Liberal	Geoffrey Vaughan Davies	7,675	17.32	
Majority		9,694	21.83	
Turnout		44,321	74.54	
Conservative hold		Swing		

General election 1955: Manchester Withington
Party	Candidate	Votes	%	±%
Conservative	Robert Cary	25,707	58.64	
Labour	John B. Hayes	13,054	29.78	
Liberal	Geoffrey Vaughan Davies	5,077	11.58	N/A
Majority		12,653	28.86	
Turnout		45,838	71.94	
Conservative hold		Swing		

General election 1951: Manchester Withington
Party	Candidate	Votes	%	±%
Conservative	Robert Cary	26,804	64.73	
Labour	James Clough	14,604	35.27	
Majority		12,200	29.46	
Turnout		41,408	80.29	
Conservative hold		Swing		

General election 1950: Manchester Withington
Party	Candidate	Votes	%	±%
Conservative	Frederick Cundiff	22,817	52.32	
Labour	Lewis Wright	14,206	32.57	
Liberal	Leonard Behrens	6,591	15.11	
Majority		8,611	19.75	
Turnout		43,614	85.31	
Conservative hold		Swing		

=== Election in the 1940s ===
General election 1945: Manchester, Withington
Party	Candidate	Votes	%	±%
Conservative	Edward Fleming	30,881	46.4	−15.9
Labour	R. Edwards	22,634	34.0	−1.4
Liberal	Leonard Behrens	13,107	19.7	−4.6
Majority		8,247	12.4	−28.4
Turnout		66,622	74.5	+3.5
Conservative hold		Swing		

=== Election in the 1930s ===
General election 1935: Manchester Withington
Party	Candidate	Votes	%	±%
Conservative	Edward Fleming	35,564	62.27	
Labour	D. Scott Morton	12,248	21.45	N/A
Liberal	William Ross	9,298	16.28	
Majority		23,316	40.82	
Turnout		57,110	70.89	
Conservative hold		Swing		

General election 1931: Manchester Withington
Party	Candidate	Votes	%	±%
Conservative	Edward Fleming	36,097	62.8	+23.0
Liberal	Philip Guedalla	21,379	37.2	−6.6
Majority		5,562	11.6	N/A
Turnout		48,168	75.8	−2.0
Conservative gain from Liberal		Swing	+14.8	

=== Elections in the 1920s ===
General election 1929: Manchester Withington
Party	Candidate	Votes	%	±%
Liberal	Ernest Simon	20,948	43.8	+4.8
Unionist	Thomas Watts	19,063	39.8	−11.1
Labour	Joseph Robinson	7,853	16.4	+7.2
Majority		1,885	4.0	N/A
Turnout		47,864	77.8	−4.0
Liberal gain from Unionist		Swing	+8.0	

General election 1924: Manchester Withington
Party	Candidate	Votes	%	±%
Unionist	Thomas Watts	13,633	50.9	−7.3
Liberal	Ernest Simon	10,435	39.0	−19.2
Labour	Edgar Whiteley	2,467	9.2	N/A
Independent	Kenneth Burke	236	0.9	N/A
Majority		3,198	11.9	N/A
Turnout		26,771	81.8	+3.8
Unionist gain from Liberal		Swing		

General election 1923: Manchester Withington
Party	Candidate	Votes	%	±%
Liberal	Ernest Simon	13,944	58.2	+9.7
Unionist	Thomas Watts	10,026	41.8	−9.7
Majority		3,918	16.4	19.4
Turnout		23,970	78.0	+0.6
Liberal gain from Unionist		Swing	+9.7	

General election 1922: Manchester Withington
Party	Candidate	Votes	%	±%
Unionist	Thomas Watts	11,678	51.5	−17.8
Liberal	Ernest Simon	11,008	48.5	+17.8
Majority		670	3.0	−35.6
Turnout		22,686	77.4	+38.8
Unionist hold		Swing	−17.8	

=== Elections in the 1910s ===
General election 1918: Manchester Withington
Party	Candidate	Votes	%	±%
Unionist	Alfred Deakin Carter	11,677	69.3	
Liberal	George Frederick Burditt	5,166	30.7	
Majority		6,511	38.6	
Turnout		16,843		
Unionist win (new seat)				

== See also ==
- List of parliamentary constituencies in Greater Manchester
