= Edward Redhead =

British civil servant and politician

Edward Redhead JP MP

Member of Parliament for Walthamstow West
- In office 1 March 1956 – 15 April 1967
- Preceded by: Clement Attlee
- Succeeded by: Fred Silvester

Personal details
- Born: Edward Charles Redhead; 8 April 1902 Walthamstow, London, England
- Died: 15 April 1967 (aged 65) London, England
- Party: Labour
- Spouse: Gladys Pannell (m. 1928)
- Children: 1

Edward Charles Redhead, JP (8 April 1902 – 15 April 1967) was a British civil servant and Labour Party politician who became the successor to Clement Attlee as Member of Parliament for Walthamstow West, which he represented from 1956 until his death.

== Civil servant ==
Redhead was born in Walthamstow and went to Walthamstow Higher Elementary School as well as receiving a private education. He left school at 15 to be a boy clerk in the Post Office. Two years later he transferred into Her Majesty's Customs and Excise, and rose steadily through the ranks to finish as a Higher Executive Officer. Active in his trade union, Redhead left the civil service to be General Secretary of the Society of Civil Servants in 1948. A school on Higham Hill Road was later named, Edward Redhead Junior School.

== Political career ==
He was active in municipal affairs, and was elected as a Labour Party councillor to Walthamstow Borough Council in 1929. From 1945 he was an Alderman, and served as Mayor of the town in 1949-1950 and again in 1961–1962. At the 1951 general election, Redhead fought Gillingham.

=== Parliament ===
When Clement Attlee received an Earldom, Redhead was the local candidate picked to follow him. He kept the seat in a 1956 byelection. From 1959 to 1964 Redhead served as an Opposition Whip, and when Labour came into government, he was Minister of State at the Board of Trade. In October 1965 he transferred to the Department of Education and Science, retiring due to ill health in January 1967. He died the following April. The resulting by-election came at an inconvenient time for the Labour government, and the Conservative candidate Frederick Silvester gained the seat.

== Personal life and death ==
In 1928, Redhead married Gladys Pannell; they had a daughter. He died in London on 15 April 1967, at the age of 65.

Parliament of the United Kingdom
| Preceded by Clement Attlee | Member of Parliament for Walthamstow West; 1956–1967 | Succeeded by Fred Silvester |
