= Charles Jesson =

Cornelius (Charles) Jesson

Member of Parliament for Walthamstow West
- In office 1918–1922
- Succeeded by: Valentine McEntee
- Majority: 3,163 (22.3%)

Personal details
- Born: 1 June 1862 Leicester
- Died: 21 September 1926 (aged 64)
- Party: National Liberal

Cornelius (Charles) Jesson (1 June 1862 – 21 September 1926) was a British politician who served as the Member of Parliament (MP) for Walthamstow West from 1918 to 1922.

Born in Leicester, Jesson was the son of a boot and shoe manufacturer. He trained as a musician and was elected in a 1906 by-election to the London County Council, representing the Walworth division of Newington. Jesson represented Walworth on the LCC until he stood down in 1919.

Jesson also became an organiser for the Amalgamated Society of Musicians (later to become the Musicians' Union). The Musicians' Union supported the National Democratic and Labour Party in the 1918 general election and Jesson was elected for Walthamstow West as one of nine NDP MPs supporting the Coalition Government of David Lloyd George.

The NDP broke up in 1922 when its leader George Nicoll Barnes retired from Parliament, and along with the remaining other NDP MPs Jesson joined the National Liberal Party. He contested Walthamstow West at that year's general election as a National Liberal, but was defeated by the Labour Party candidate Valentine McEntee and did not stand for Parliament again.

Parliament of the United Kingdom
New constituency	Member of Parliament for Walthamstow West; 1918 – 1922	Succeeded by Valentine McEntee
