= Edward Fleming =

British politician

Edward Lascelles Fleming (c. 1891 – 17 February 1950) was a Conservative Party politician in the United Kingdom.

He unsuccessfully contested the Leigh constituency at the 1922 general election, and did not stand again until the 1931 general election, when he won the Manchester Withington seat. He remained Withington's member of parliament (MP) until the 1950 general election when he stood as a candidate in the Manchester Moss Side seat but died six days before polling day.

Parliament of the United Kingdom
Preceded by Ernest Simon	Member of Parliament for Manchester Withington; 1931–1950	Succeeded by Frederick Cundiff
