= Michael Ogden =

British barrister

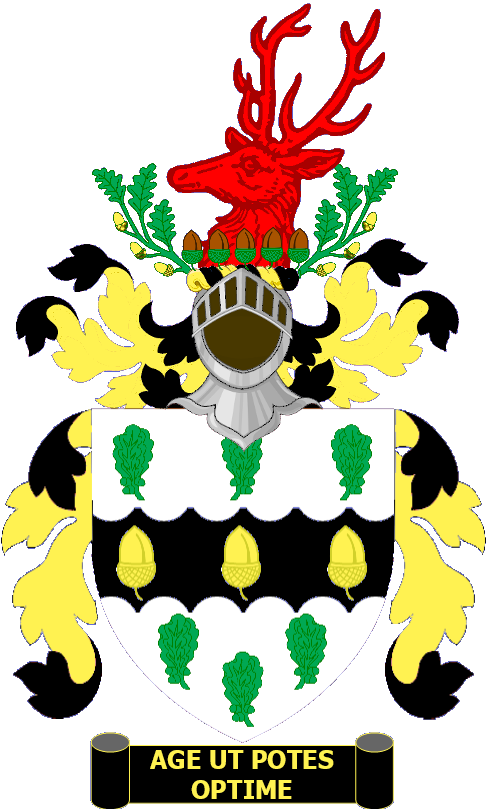
Arms displayed at Lincoln's Inn

Sir Edward Michael Ogden, QC (9 April 1926 – 31 January 2003) was a British barrister. The chairman of the Criminal Injuries Compensation Board from 1975 to 1989, he is best remembered for heading the working party which produced the eponymous Ogden tables, actuarial tables used by courts to assess future losses in personal injury and fatal accident cases.
