= Joseph Frederick Green =

British politician (1855–1932)

- Portrait by Walter Stoneman, 1921

Member of Parliament (MP) for Leicester West
- In office 1918–1922
- Preceded by: Constituency established
- Succeeded by: Alfred Hill

Personal details
- Born: 5 July 1855
- Died: 1 May 1932 (aged 76)
- Party: National Democratic and Labour Party (formerly)
- Other political affiliations: Liberal Party, Independent Labour Party, Fabian Society, Social Democratic Federation, British Workers League, National Liberal Party, Conservative Party
- Occupation: Politician

Joseph Frederick Green (5 July 1855 – 1 May 1932) was a British politician. He sat in the House of Commons from 1918 to 1922 as the Member of Parliament (MP) for Leicester West.

== Life ==
He was born in London, the son of Joseph Edwin Green JP of Lloyd's of London and his wife Hannah Rosa How. He was educated at Islington Proprietary School. He matriculated in 1875 at St Mary Hall, Oxford; he went on to King's College, London.

Green worked as a curate in his youth, but later left the church. He became involved in politics through the Liberal Party, serving as secretary of the St George's Hanover Square Liberal Association, and on the committee of the National Liberal Club. In the 1890s, he instead joined the Independent Labour Party and the Fabian Society, serving on its executive in 1899/1900. Around this time, he also served as secretary of the International Arbitration Association, and of the Friends of Russian Freedom.

In the 1900s, Green joined the Social Democratic Federation (SDF), serving as its treasurer for a time. He resigned in 1911 in protest at H. M. Hyndman's calls for the Royal Navy to be enlarged. However, his views changed dramatically with the outbreak of World War I, and he joined the Socialist National Defence Committee, a pro-war split from the SDF's successor, the British Socialist Party. A supporter of Victor Fisher, he followed him into the British Workers League, before joining the National Democratic and Labour Party (NDP).

Standing as a candidate of the NDP, with support of the Liberal-led and Conservative-dominated coalition government, Green contested the newly created Leicester West constituency at the 1918 general election. His only opponent was the Labour Party candidate Ramsay MacDonald, a sitting MP for the two-seat Leicester constituency until it was divided for this election.

With coalition support, Green won 76% of the votes, defeating MacDonald. However, at the 1922 general election, without coalition support, Green stood as a National Liberal Party candidate. He won only 28.4% of the votes, and lost his seat to the Labour Party candidate Alfred Hill. Green did not stand again. Instead, he joined the Conservative Party, and found work at its headquarters.

Parliament of the United Kingdom
New constituency see Leicester	Member of Parliament for Leicester West; 1918 – 1922	Succeeded by Alfred Hill
Party political offices
Preceded by F. J. Jones	President of the Social Democratic Federation; 1903	Succeeded by Peter Walker
