= Braunstone =

Braunstone may refer to:

- Braunstone Town, a town in the Blaby district of Leicestershire, England
- Braunstone Park, a public park in Braunstone Town, Leicester, England
- Braunstone Park & Rowley Fields, a ward of the city of Leicester, England, encompassing the suburb of Braunstone Frith
- Braunstone, New South Wales, a locality in Australia
