= Pethick-Lawrence =

Pethick-Lawrence may refer to:

- Emmeline Pethick-Lawrence (1867–1954), British suffragist
- Frederick Pethick-Lawrence, 1st Baron Pethick-Lawrence (1871–1961), British politician, husband of the above
- Helen Millar Craggs, second wife of Frederick Pethick-Lawrence, (1888–1969), British suffragette and pharmacist
