= Leicester West =

UK Parliament constituency (since 1974)

Coordinates: 52.65°N 1.16°W

- Borough constituency for the House of Commons
- Interactive map of boundaries since 2024
- Location within the East Midlands
- County: Leicestershire
- Electorate: 72,848 (March 2020)

Current constituency
- Created: 1974
- Member of Parliament: Liz Kendall (Labour)
- Seats: One
- Created from: Leicester North West and Leicester South West

1918–1950
- Seats: One
- Created from: Leicester
- Replaced by: Leicester North West and Leicester South West

Leicester West is a constituency (Note: A borough constituency (for the purposes of election expenses and type of returning officer)) in Leicestershire. The seat was created in 1974, and existed in a previous form from 1918 to 1950. The seat has been represented in the House of Commons of the Parliament of the United Kingdom by Liz Kendall of the Labour Party since 2010. (Note: As with all constituencies, the constituency elects one Member of Parliament (MP) by the first past the post system of election at least every five years.) Until July 2026, Kendall served as Secretary of State for Science, Innovation and Technology in the government of Keir Starmer. Since its creation in 1918 (and its recreation in 1974), the seat has sided with parties from the left wing of politics.

== Constituency profile ==
Leicester West is a constituency in Leicestershire. It covers the western neighbourhoods of the city of Leicester, including Beaumont Leys, Westcotes, New Parks, Rowley Fields and Aylestone. Leicester has a strong association with the textile, clothing and shoemaking industries, which – having suffered a devastating slump in the early 1980s – survived in the city in a vestigial form until recently but mostly collapsed during the 2020s. Potato crisp manufacturer Walkers is a significant local employer; the company's headquarters and main factory – the largest crisp factory in the world – is located in Beaumont Leys. Leicester West has high levels of deprivation, particularly in New Parks and around Braunstone Park, where there is a high proportion of council housing. House prices in the constituency are lower than the rest of the East Midlands and considerably lower than the national average.

In general, residents of Leicester West are young and have low levels of education. Rates of homeownership and household income are low. A high proportion of residents work in the health and manufacturing sectors, and few work in professional occupations. The child poverty rate is high, and the percentage of residents claiming unemployment benefits is higher than the country as a whole. White people made up 63% of the population at the 2021 census, the highest proportion of the three Leicester constituencies. Asians, mostly Indians, were the largest ethnic minority group at 18% and Black people were 10%. Unlike neighbouring Leicester East, the Asian population is mostly Muslim rather than Hindu. On Leicester City Council, the inner-city areas like Westcotes and the more deprived suburbs such as New Parks are represented by the Labour Party, while Beaumont Leys has elected Conservative councillors and Aylestone has elected Liberal Democrats. An estimated 55% of voters in Leicester West supported leaving the European Union in the 2016 referendum, higher than the nationwide figure of 52%.

== Boundaries ==
=== Historic ===
1918–1950: The County Borough of Leicester wards of Abbey, Newton, St Margaret's, Westcotes, and Wyggeston.

1974–1983: The County Borough of Leicester wards of Abbey, Newton, North Braunstone, St Margaret's, and Westcotes.

1983–2010: The City of Leicester wards of Abbey, Beaumont Leys, Mowmacre, New Parks, North Braunstone, Rowley Fields, St Augustine's, Westcotes, and Western Park.

2010–2024: The City of Leicester wards of Abbey, Beaumont Leys, Braunstone Park and Rowley Fields, Fosse, New Parks, Westcotes, and Western Park.

Further to a local government boundary review which became effective in May 2015, the New Parks ward was largely absorbed into the Western Park ward which was renamed the Western ward.

=== Current ===
The City of Leicester wards of Abbey, Aylestone, Beaumont Leys, Braunstone Park & Rowley Fields, Fosse, Westcotes, and Western.

Following the 2023 review of Westminster constituencies, which came into effect for the 2024 general election, the size of the constituency was increased to bring it within the permitted electoral range with the transfer of Aylestone ward from Leicester South.

== History ==
In 1950, the seat was replaced by the constituencies of Leicester North West and Leicester South West, until 1974. During that period Leicester North West was represented by Barnett Janner until 1970, and subsequently by his son Greville Janner.

This used to be the safest Labour seat in Leicester; at the 1983 general election it was the only one to remain in Labour hands. However, the high South Asian populations in Leicester South and Leicester East tended historically to push them away from the Conservative Party; conversely, while Leicester West is still a safe Labour seat and has been represented by that party since the Second World War, it has become the most marginal of the three Leicester seats. While it did, like the other two Leicester constituencies, see a significant swing to Labour in 2017, Liz Kendall's majority was not a record high for the constituency, unlike the results in Leicester East and Leicester South. However, Leicester West was the only Leicester seat to remain in Labour hands after the 2024 general election, with Leicester East becoming the sole Conservative gain of the election, and Leicester South won by independent candidate Shockat Adam.

== Members of Parliament ==
=== MPs 1918–1950 ===
Leicester prior to 1918

Election	Member	Party
1918	Joseph Frederick Green	Coalition National Democratic
1922	Alfred Hill	Labour
1923	Frederick Pethick-Lawrence	Labour
1931	Ernest Pickering	Liberal
1935	Harold Nicolson	National Labour
1945	Barnett Janner	Labour
1950	constituency abolished	

=== MPs since 1974 ===
Leicester North West and Leicester South West prior to 1974

Year	Member	Party
Feb 1974	Greville Janner	Labour
1997	Patricia Hewitt	Labour
2010	Liz Kendall	Labour

== Elections ==
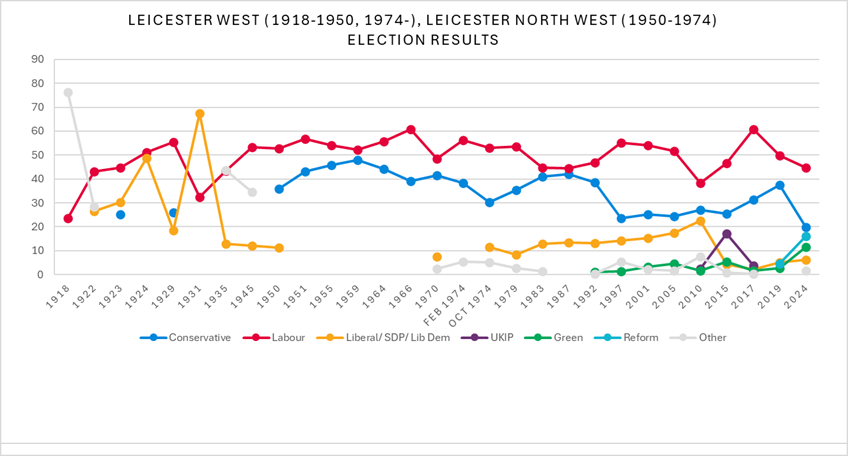
Leicester west and Leicester north west election results 1918–2024

=== Elections in the 2020s ===
General election 2024: Leicester West
Party	Candidate	Votes	%	±%
Labour	Liz Kendall	15,798	44.6	−4.7
Conservative	Max Chauhan	7,021	19.8	−16.8
Reform	Ian Hayes	5,666	16.0	+11.5
Green	Aasiya Bora	4,089	11.6	+8.8
Liberal Democrats	Benjamin Feist	2,179	6.2	−0.5
One Leicester	Rahoul Naik	327	0.9	New
TUSC	Steve Score	317	0.9	New
Majority		8,777	24.8	+12.7
Turnout		35,397	48.0	−5.2
Registered electors		74,102		
Labour hold		Swing	+6.1	

=== Elections in the 2010s ===
General election 2019: Leicester West
Party	Candidate	Votes	%	±%
Labour	Liz Kendall	17,291	49.7	−11.1
Conservative	Amanda Wright	13,079	37.6	+6.2
Liberal Democrats	Ian Bradwell	1,808	5.2	+3.1
Brexit Party	Jack Collier	1,620	4.7	New
Green	Ani Goddard	977	2.8	+1.2
Majority		4,212	12.1	−17.3
Turnout		34,775	53.6	−4.3
Labour hold		Swing	−8.7	

General election 2017: Leicester West
Party	Candidate	Votes	%	±%
Labour	Liz Kendall	22,823	60.8	+14.3
Conservative	Jack Hickey	11,763	31.4	+5.8
UKIP	Stuart Young	1,406	3.7	−13.5
Liberal Democrats	Ian Bradwell	792	2.1	−2.3
Green	Mel Gould	607	1.6	−3.8
Independent	David Bowley	121	0.3	New
Majority		11,060	29.4	+8.5
Turnout		37,512	57.9	+3.3
Labour hold		Swing	+4.3	

General election 2015: Leicester West
Party	Candidate	Votes	%	±%
Labour	Liz Kendall	16,051	46.5	+8.1
Conservative	Paul Bessant	8,848	25.6	−1.6
UKIP	Stuart Young	5,950	17.2	+14.7
Green	Peter Hague	1,878	5.4	+3.6
Liberal Democrats	Ian Bradwell	1,507	4.4	−18.2
TUSC	Heather Rawling	288	0.8	+0.4
Majority		7,203	20.9	+9.7
Turnout		34,522	54.6	−0.6
Labour hold		Swing	+4.8	

General election 2010: Leicester West
Party	Candidate	Votes	%	±%
Labour	Liz Kendall	13,745	38.4	−12.4
Conservative	Celia Harvey	9,728	27.2	+2.8
Liberal Democrats	Peter Coley	8,107	22.6	+4.4
BNP	Gary Reynolds	2,158	6.0	New
UKIP	Stephen Ingall	883	2.5	New
Green	Geoff Forse	639	1.8	−3.0
Independent	Steven Huggins	181	0.5	New
TUSC	Steve Score	157	0.4	New
Pirate	Shaun Dyer	113	0.3	New
Independent	David Bowley	108	0.3	New
Majority		4,017	11.2	−16.1
Turnout		35,819	55.2	+2.6
Labour hold		Swing	−7.6	

=== Elections in the 2000s ===
General election 2005: Leicester West
Party	Candidate	Votes	%	±%
Labour	Patricia Hewitt	17,184	51.7	−2.5
Conservative	Sarah Richardson	8,114	24.4	−0.8
Liberal Democrats	Zuffar Haq	5,803	17.5	+2.2
Green	Geoff Forse	1,571	4.7	+1.5
Socialist	Steve Score	552	1.7	New
Majority		9,070	27.3	−1.7
Turnout		33,224	53.3	+2.4
Labour hold		Swing	−0.8	

General election 2001: Leicester West
Party	Candidate	Votes	%	±%
Labour	Patricia Hewitt	18,014	54.2	−1.0
Conservative	Christopher Shaw	8,375	25.2	+1.5
Liberal Democrats	Andy Vincent	5,085	15.3	+1.1
Green	Matthew Gough	1,074	3.2	+1.8
Socialist Labour	Sean Kirkpatrick	350	1.1	0.0
Socialist Alliance	Stephen Score	321	1.0	New
Majority		9,639	29.0	−2.5
Turnout		33,219	50.9	−12.2
Labour hold		Swing	−1.2	

=== Elections in the 1990s ===
General election 1997: Leicester West
Party	Candidate	Votes	%	±%
Labour	Patricia Hewitt	22,580	55.2	+8.4
Conservative	Richard Thomas	9,716	23.7	−14.8
Liberal Democrats	Mark Jones	5,795	14.2	+0.9
Referendum	William Shooter	970	2.4	New
Green	Geoff Forse	586	1.4	+0.3
Socialist Labour	David Roberts	452	1.1	New
Socialist	Josephine Nicholls	327	0.8	New
BNP	Adrian Belshaw	302	0.7	New
National Democrats	Clive Potter	186	0.5	New
Majority		12,864	31.5	+23.2
Turnout		40,914	63.1	−10.6
Labour hold		Swing	+11.6	

General election 1992: Leicester West
Party	Candidate	Votes	%	±%
Labour	Greville Janner	22,574	46.8	+2.3
Conservative	John Guthrie	18,596	38.5	−3.6
Liberal Democrats	Geoffrey F. Walker	6,402	13.3	−0.2
Green	Claire D. Wintram	517	1.1	New
Natural Law	Jenny M. Rosta	171	0.4	New
Majority		3,978	8.3	+5.9
Turnout		48,260	73.7	+0.2
Labour hold		Swing	+2.9	

=== Elections in the 1980s ===
General election 1987: Leicester West
Party	Candidate	Votes	%	±%
Labour	Greville Janner	22,156	44.5	−0.3
Conservative	James Cooper	20,955	42.1	+1.0
SDP	William Edgar	6,708	13.5	+0.8
Majority		1,201	2.4	−1.3
Turnout		49,819	73.5	+4.7
Labour hold		Swing	−1.3	

General election 1983: Leicester West
Party	Candidate	Votes	%	±%
Labour	Greville Janner	20,837	44.8	−8.8
Conservative	Robert Meacham	19,125	41.1	+5.7
SDP	Sumal Fernando	5,935	12.8	New
BNP	Ray Hill	469	1.0	New
Workers Revolutionary	B.J. Prangle	176	0.4	New
Majority		1,712	3.7	−14.5
Turnout		46,542	68.8	−3.5
Labour hold		Swing	−7.3	

=== Elections in the 1970s ===
General election 1979: Leicester West
Party	Candidate	Votes	%	±%
Labour	Greville Janner	26,032	53.60	+0.69
Conservative	Alastair Ross Goobey	17,194	35.40	+5.01
Liberal	A. Lycett	4,032	8.30	−3.31
National Front	P. Ash	1,308	2.69	−0.75
Majority		8,838	18.20	
Turnout		48,566	72.26	
Labour hold		Swing	−4.32	

General election October 1974: Leicester West
Party	Candidate	Votes	%	±%
Labour	Greville Janner	23,406	52.91	
Conservative	Anthony Simpson	13,446	30.39	
Liberal	J. Windram	5,135	11.61	New
National Front	W. Newcombe	2,253	5.09	
Majority		9,960	22.52	
Turnout		44,240	68.43	
Labour hold		Swing		

General election February 1974: Leicester West
Party	Candidate	Votes	%	±%
Labour	Greville Janner	27,195	56.28	
Conservative	Anthony Simpson	18,543	38.38	
National Front	W. Newcombe	2,579	5.34	
Majority		8,652	17.90	
Turnout		48,317	75.45	
Labour win (new seat)				

=== Election in the 1940s ===
General election 1945: Leicester West
Party	Candidate	Votes	%	±%
Labour	Barnett Janner	20,563	53.34	
National	Harold Nicolson (Note: Due to National Labour dissolving as a party before the 1945 general election, Nicholson stood as a National candidate in the seat.)	13,348	34.63	
Liberal	Joseph Arnold Kirby	4,639	12.03	
Majority		7,215	18.71	N/A
Turnout		38,550	76.80	
Labour gain from National Labour		Swing		

=== Elections in the 1930s ===
General election 1935: Leicester West
Party	Candidate	Votes	%	±%
National Labour	Harold Nicolson	15,821	43.73	New
Labour	John Morgan	15,734	43.49	
Liberal	Horace Crawfurd	4,621	12.77	
Majority		87	0.24	N/A
Turnout		35,636	66.83	
National Labour gain from Liberal		Swing		

General election 1931: Leicester West
Party	Candidate	Votes	%	±%
Liberal	Ernest Pickering	26,826	67.49	
Labour	Frederick Pethick-Lawrence	12,923	32.51	
Majority		13,903	34.98	N/A
Turnout		39,749	74.64	
Liberal gain from Labour		Swing		

=== Elections in the 1920s ===
General election 1929: Leicester West
Party	Candidate	Votes	%	±%
Labour	Frederick Pethick-Lawrence	22,635	55.3	+4.1
Unionist	Paul Emrys-Evans	10,691	26.1	New
Liberal	Charles William Hartshorn	7,617	18.6	−30.2
Majority		11,944	29.2	+26.8
Turnout		40,943	78.3	+2.2
Registered electors		52,318		
Labour hold		Swing	+17.2	

General election 1924: Leicester West
Party	Candidate	Votes	%	±%
Labour	Frederick Pethick-Lawrence	16,047	51.2	+6.6
Liberal	Maurice Alfred Gerothwohl	15,310	48.8	+18.6
Majority		737	2.4	−12.0
Turnout		31,357	76.1	+0.1
Registered electors		41,207		
Labour hold		Swing	−6.0	

General election 1923: Leicester West
Party	Candidate	Votes	%	±%
Labour	Frederick Pethick-Lawrence	13,634	44.6	−0.4
Liberal	Winston Churchill	9,236	30.2	+3.6
Unionist	Alfred Instone	7,696	25.2	New
Majority		4,398	14.4	−2.2
Turnout		30,566	76.0	+3.5
Registered electors		40,244		
Labour hold		Swing	−2.0	

General election 1922: Leicester West
Party	Candidate	Votes	%	±%
Labour	Alfred Hill	12,929	45.0	+21.4
National Democratic	Joseph Frederick Green	8,137	28.4	−48.0
Liberal	Ernest Spero	7,631	26.6	New
Majority		4,792	16.6	N/A
Turnout		28,697	72.5	+6.3
Registered electors		39,604		
Labour gain from National Democratic		Swing	+34.7	

=== Election in the 1910s ===
General election 1918: Leicester West
Party		Candidate	Votes	%	±%
C	National Democratic	Joseph Frederick Green	20,570	76.4	
	Labour	Ramsay MacDonald	6,347	23.6	
Majority			14,223	52.8	
Turnout			26,917	66.2	
Registered electors			40,634		
	National Democratic win (new seat)				
C indicates candidate endorsed by the coalition government.

== See also ==
- List of parliamentary constituencies in Leicestershire and Rutland
