= Braunstone Park & Rowley Fields =

Electoral ward of Leicester, England

Coordinates: 52°36′N 1°10′W

- Population: 16,614
- Unitary authority: Leicester
- Ceremonial county: Leicestershire
- Region: East Midlands
- Country: England
- Sovereign state: United Kingdom
- Post town: LEICESTER
- Postcode district: LE3
- Dialling code: 0116
- Police: Leicestershire
- Fire: Leicestershire
- Ambulance: East Midlands
- UK Parliament: Leicester West

Braunstone Park & Rowley Fields is an electoral ward and administrative division of the city of Leicester, England. It comprises the western Leicester suburbs of Braunstone Frith, Braunstone Park and Rowley Fields.

== Geography ==
Braunstone Park & Rowley Fields is bounded by the wards of New Parks and Western Park to the north, Westcotes to the east and Aylestone to the south-east. South of the ward is the district of Blaby and the town of Braunstone in Leicestershire, which has a shared history with the Leicester suburbs.

== History ==
Braunstone was mentioned in the Domesday book when it was owned by Hugh de Grandmesnil. It was substantially extended in the early twentieth century, and included the first of Leicester's large estates of council housing.

Originally part of the parish of Braunstone, the area containing social housing was annexed by Leicester City Council in 1935 as the Braunstone Estate. The remainder of the build retained the Parish of Braunstone name, but was renamed in 1977 as Braunstone Town. This area was privately owned housing, created by the local company, Turnbull Building Co and Sons. Turnbull Drive, part of the estate, was named after the company; Edward Avenue and Francis Avenue nearby represent the then sons of the company owner.

The Braunstone Estate is dominated by the park, one of the largest in the city, while the striking feature of Braunstone Town is the wide Kingsway, a road which features a large village green at its heart running for the entirety of the street. Braunstone Park is a 168-acre (0.68 km^{2}) park in western Leicester, England. It is in the Braunstone area, and is approximately triangle shaped, with the base being at the south, and a small frontage north onto the A47 (Hinckley Road). The park is the setting for Braunstone Hall, and is the remnant of the large Braunstone estate.

There is a divide between the social housing of Braunstone Estate, and the privately owned housing in Braunstone Town (Formerly the Parish of Braunstone). This was created to maintain social class sensibilities, an important factor in 1930s British society. This division is created by Braunstone Lane, which runs through the heart of the old Braunstone Village. Both estates were created from 1935 onwards with the social housing appearing utilitarian and the private housing taking on a range of styles of the classic British 1930-40s semi-detached house.

Travelling along the Braunstone Lane from the city centre feed road (Narborough Road) to Leicester Forest East, the social housing (Braunstone Estate) lies to the right and the private housing (Braunstone Town) lies to the left. Many buildings of much earlier periods than the 1930s exist in the heart of the former village including the old school house, the former Shakespeare Inn, the former village shop and some private homes. Many of the former council houses are now also privately owned following a national wave of council property sales initiated by the Thatcher Government from the late 1970s to the present day. Pockets of both sections of both estates now also feature buildings from later development periods, including the multi purpose community centre in Braunstone Town, Braunstone Civic Centre, which lies at the end of the Kingsway. Some of the newer build properties in the heart of areas heavily proportioned by 30's style buildings, emerged as a result of vacant land created by World War II bomb damage from "stray" bombing. The two estates were within range of German planes in the bombing of the nearby City of Coventry. (The German Airforce would commonly offload excess bombs on unsuspecting/non-target residential areas).

The Braunstone Estate won £49.5 million of funding from the Tony Blair Labour Government's New Deal for Communities regeneration scheme in the late 1990s, after Government statistics showed that this estate was one of the most deprived in the East Midlands. The New Deal led to a series of improvements, including a new leisure centre, health centre and a library and learning complex called The BRITE Centre.

Key current issues for Braunstone Town include the continued development of the Thorpe Astley estate and Meridian Leisure, traffic management along Narborough Road South and into the neighbouring Fosse Shopping Park shopping complex, and the expansion of the shopping complex, alongside pollution issues from the neighbouring junction 21 of the M1 motorway and the expansion of some neighbouring greenfield sites into business premises such as seen at Grove Farm Triangle and Grove Park. The former Jones and Shipman Engineering works (once the biggest employer of Braunstone residents) has been redeveloped into a modern housing estate.

Braunstone Town was used as a film location site in 1985 for the filming of the Thames Television adaptation of the early Adrian Mole novels by the Leicester born Author Sue Townsend. The shops on the Turnbull Drive/Edward Avenue crossroads can be seen in the series as can the Braunstone Civic Centre.

== Amenities and facilities ==
Braunstone Park contains two large ponds, and a children's play area on the park. In the centre of the park is Braunstone Hall, which was built as a private house in 1775, and became a school in 1932. The school closed in 1997 but after becoming derelict, it has been redeveloped into a hotel and conference centre.

At the edge of the park is Braunstone Leisure Centre, which is run by Leicester City Council. Braunstone Swimming Club is the local competitive Swimming Club.
