= Alfred Hill (politician) =

British politician

Alfred Hill (1867 – 14 July 1945) was a British Labour Party politician. He sat in the House of Commons from 1922 to 1923 as the Member of Parliament (MP) for Leicester West.

At the 1922 general election, he won the Leicester West seat in a 3-way contest, defeating the sitting MP Joseph Frederick Green. Green had been elected in 1918 general election as a National Democratic and Labour Party, but stood in 1922 as National Liberal candidate.

Hill did not stand again at the 1923 general election, when the seat was held for Labour by Frederick Pethick-Lawrence.

Parliament of the United Kingdom
Preceded by Joseph Frederick Green	Member of Parliament for Leicester West; 1922 – 1923	Succeeded by Frederick Pethick-Lawrence
