= National Democratic League =

Defunct political organization in the United Kingdom

The National Democratic League was a cross-party political organisation in the United Kingdom, which aimed to unite Liberal Party and former Independent Labour Party (ILP) members in a campaign for basic democratic reforms.

The League was founded in October 1900 on the initiative of William Thompson, editor of Reynold's News. Concerned by the Conservative Party majority in the 1900 UK general election and the establishment of the Labour Representation Committee (LRC), he called the "Democratic Convention", aiming to bring together liberals and socialists on a basic democratic programme, inspired by Chartism.

The League's programme contained seven proposals: universal adult suffrage, automatic electoral registration, the abolition of multiple voting, for the state to cover election expenses, and to pay MPs, the abolition of the House of Lords, and the introduction of a two-round system of voting.

Although the programme was limited, it did attract the support of some branches of the ILP and Social Democratic Federation. Their national organisations did not seek to prohibit them from participating, but were strongly critical of the limited focus of the League.

Tom Mann became the league's first Secretary, serving for three years; he was simultaneously employed as its full-time organiser. He was succeeded by Victor Fisher. Thompson served as the President, while David Lloyd George, Robert Smillie, W. C. Steadman and Richard Bell were among its Vice-Presidents.

Although initial interest soon faded, Mann's work led to a short revival in its fortunes in 1902. At this time, the League was particularly strong in London; by 1902, it had 31 branches there, with 34 in the remainder of the country. However, it soon declined everywhere, particularly as the LRC gained strength and became the Labour Party. Thompson lost interest in the organisation, and Frank Hugh O'Donnell took over the presidency, while the Fabian James E. Dobson became Secretary, and John Ward became Chairman. It appears to have dissolved some time after 1911.
