= Marie du Sautoy Newby =

English suffragette (1880–1962)

Kathleen Marie Anstice du Sautoy Newby
- Born: 1880; Bromley, Kent, England
- Died: 1962 (aged 81–82); Devon, England
- Organisation(s): Women's Social and Political Union, Church League for Women's Suffrage
- Children: 1
- Awards: Hunger Strike Medal

Kathleen Marie Anstice Newby (née du Sautoy, 1880–1962) was an English suffragette.

== Family ==
du Sautoy was born in 1880 in Bromley, Kent. Her father Frederick du Sautoy was a clergyman. In 1902 she married Charles Henry Newby, a surgeon, and they had a daughter.

== Activism ==
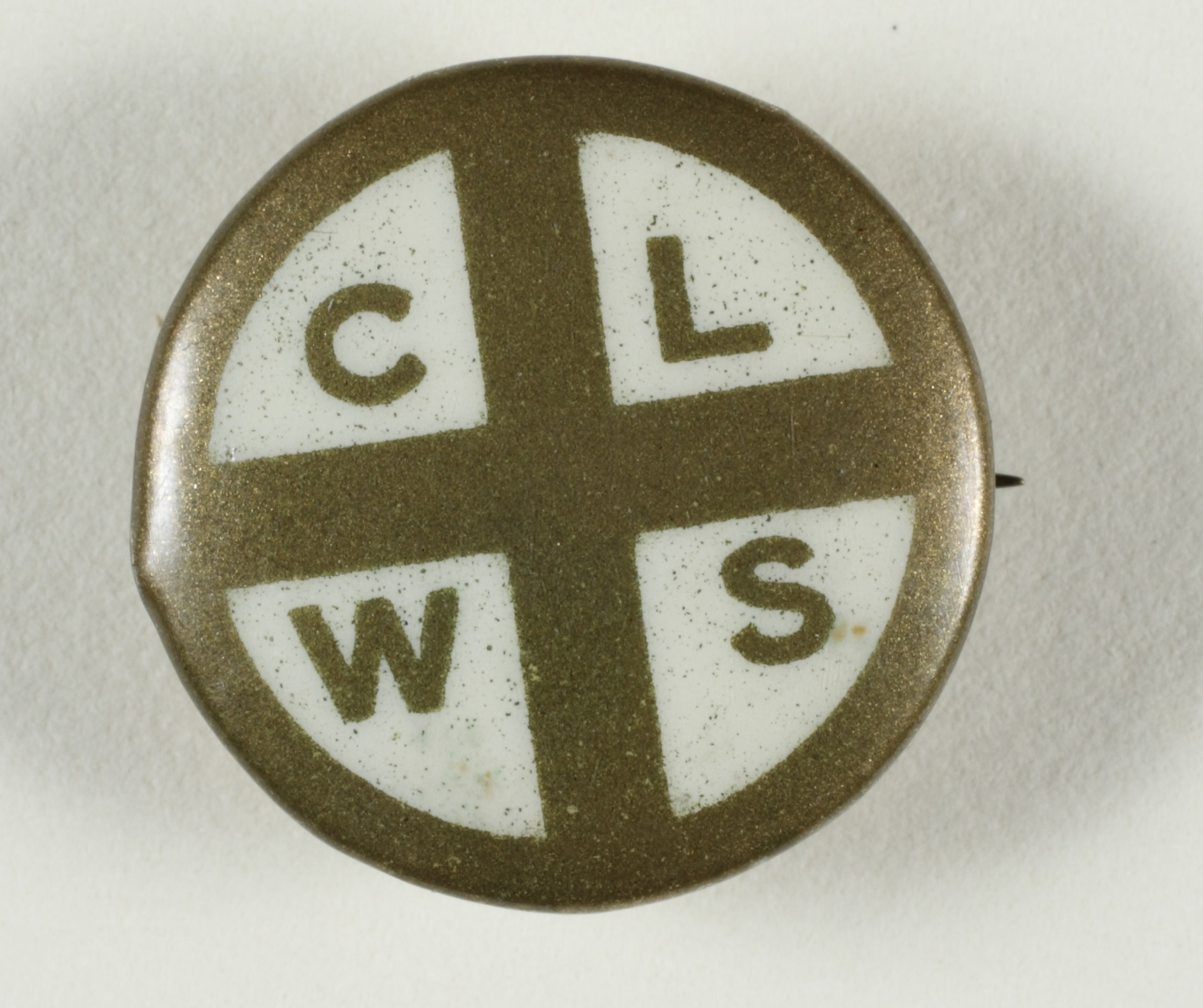
Church League for Women's Suffrage badge

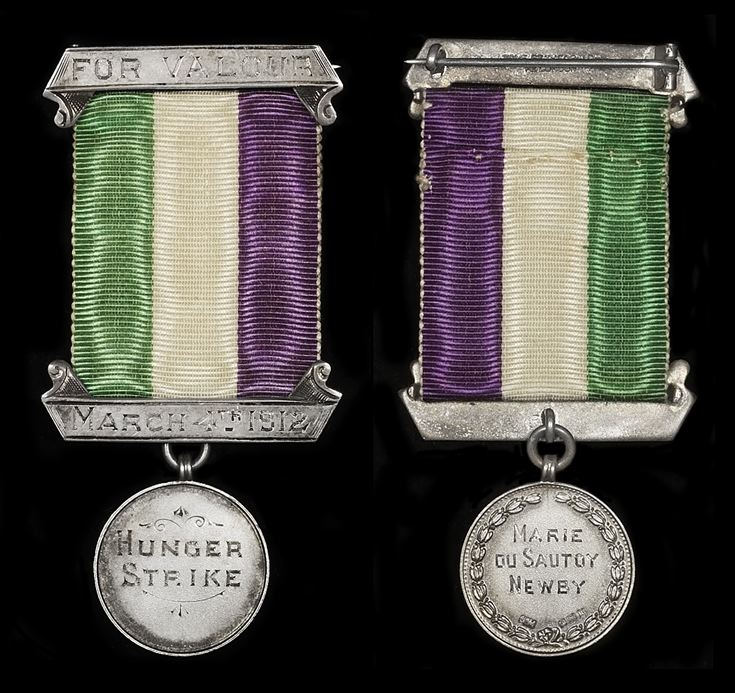
Hunger Strike Medal awarded to Newby

Newby joined the Women's Social and Political Union (WSPU) after hearing Annie Kenney speak at the Runnacleave Theatre in November 1910. She became Honorary Secretary of the Ilfracombe and Barnstable branch of the WSPU and campaigned in Ilfracombe wearing an apron advertising the newspaper Votes for Women. She also became Secretary of the Church League for Women's Suffrage.

In June 1911, Newby participated with Nurse Anne Ball in The Great Procession of Women. On 4 March 1912, Newby protested in London and broke a window at the Home Office. She was inspired by the suffragette glass breaker Helen Millar Craggs, who she had worked with when Craggs was employed in North Devon as a paid WSPU organiser. Newby was sentenced to two months imprisonment with hard labour. During her imprisonment, she went on hunger strike and was awarded the Hunger Strike Medal for valour after release.

She died in 1962.
