= Ernest Pickering (politician) =

British politician (1881–1957)

Pickering

Ernest Harold Pickering (1881 – 31 January 1957) was a British Liberal Member of Parliament for the Leicester West constituency. He was also Professor of English Literature at Tokyo University.

== Background ==
He was born in Leicester.

== Professional career ==
Pickering was a Unitarian Minister. He was author of A Brief Survey of English Literature. He was Professor of English at Yamagata, Koto Gakko, Japan. He was Professor of English Literature at Tokyo University.

== Political career ==
He was Liberal candidate for the Leicester West division at the 1931 General Election. Following the formation of the National Government, the Conservatives and Liberals agreed not to oppose each other in Leicester and as part of that arrangement, Pickering was given a free run against his Labour opponent. He managed to gain the seat. In parliament, Pickering took the official Liberal whip and sat on the government benches until the Liberal Party moved into opposition in 1933. He did not defend his seat at the 1935 General Election. He did not contest the 1945 General Election. He was Liberal candidate for the Newark division of Nottinghamshire at the 1950 General Election. He did not stand for parliament again.

=== Electoral record ===
General election 1931: Leicester West
Party	Candidate	Votes	%	±%
Liberal	Ernest Harold Pickering	26,826	67.49	
Labour	Frederick Pethick-Lawrence	12,923	32.51	
Majority		13,903	34.98	
Turnout			74.64	
Liberal gain from Labour		Swing		

General election 1950: Newark
Party	Candidate	Votes	%	±%
Labour	George Deer	28,959	54.20	
Conservative	Sidney Shephard	21,522	40.28	
Liberal	Ernest Harold Pickering	2,950	5.52	
Majority		7,437	13.92	
Turnout			88.08	
Labour gain from Conservative		Swing		

Parliament of the United Kingdom
Preceded by Frederick Pethick-Lawrence	Member of Parliament for Leicester West; 1931–1935	Succeeded by Harold Nicolson
