= National Democratic and Labour Party =

Political party in the United Kingdom

The National Democratic and Labour Party, usually abbreviated to National Democratic Party (NDP), was a short-lived political party in the United Kingdom. Its predecessors were the British Workers' National League, and the Socialist National Defence Committee.

== History ==
The party's origins lay in a split by the right wing of the British Socialist Party, primarily over issues raised by the First World War. In 1915, Victor Fisher formed the Socialist National Defence Committee along with Alexander M. Thompson and Robert Blatchford. They supported "the eternal idea of nationality" and aimed to promote "socialist measures in the war effort". The Committee was supported by John Hodge, George Henry Roberts, and for a time by Henry Hyndman who subsequently formed his own party, the National Socialist Party.

In 1916, this committee formed the British Workers League. It described itself as a "patriotic labour" group, and focused on support for the war and the British Empire and opposition to Little Englander and Cobdenite laissez-faire economics. The League was subsidised by Waldorf Astor through Lord Milner, who consulted with Fisher during the war. The League was supported by Labour MPs such as James O'Grady, Stephen Walsh and William Abraham.

The League sought to challenge pacificist Parliamentary candidates; this caused a rupture with the Labour Party. Eleven out of thirty-eight of the Labour Parliamentary MPs showed support for the British Workers League; however, many later returned to the Labour Party.

The British Workers League reconstituted itself in 1918 as the National Democratic and Labour Party, with the support of George Barnes, MP for Glasgow Blackfriars and Hutchesontown, when he resigned from the Labour Party (Barnes, however, never stood for election under the NDP banner, and was re-elected in 1918 as a Coalition Labour MP). The NDP policy was described as follows, 'Support of the Coalition Government and the war effort. Broadly socialist in outlook and claimed to represent "the patriotic working class." It was bitterly opposed to the pacifist elements within the Labour Party.' The group gained the support of the Musicians' Union and parts of other unions, including some sections of the Miners' Federation of Great Britain. It was primarily funded by Lloyd George Coalition Liberals.

At its high water mark, the party fielded twenty-eight candidates in the 1918 general election—twenty of them on the Coalition Coupon—and won ten seats. After the election, Clement Edwards was elected chairman of the NDP in parliament.

The National Democratic and Labour's remaining MPs joined the National Liberal Party and stood under that label in the 1922 general election. The National Democratic and Labour Party was wound up in 1923, but a grouping continued as the Empire Citizens' League from 1925 until the late 1920s. Its journal was renamed the Empire Citizen, which ceased publication in September 1927. Victor Fisher stood, unsuccessfully, for the Conservative Party.

== Election results ==
=== 1918 UK general election ===
Constituency	Candidate	Votes	Percentage	Position
Aberdare	Charles Stanton	22,824	78.6	1
Accrington	William Hammond	738	2.5	4
Birmingham Duddeston	Eldred Hallas	8,796	79.4	1
Bradford East	Charles Edgar Loseby	9,390	41.1	1
Broxtowe	H. H. Whaite	4,374	21.6	3
Consett	Robert Gee	7,283	32.9	2
Derby	Harold M. Smith	13,012	19.6	4
Don Valley	James Walton	6,095	46.2	1
Dumbarton Burghs	John Taylor	11,734	52.6	1
East Ham South	Clement Edwards	7,972	42.8	1
Edinburgh East	Alexander E. Balfour	5,136	37.8	2
Hamilton	David Gilmour	4,297	25.9	3
Stoke-on-Trent Hanley	James Seddon	8,032	40.4	1
Houghton-le-Spring	John Lindsley	6,185	30.7	3
Leicester West	Joseph Frederick Green	20,150	76.0	1
Mansfield	George Jarrett	6,678	32.6	2
Nuneaton	William Henry Dyson	1,101	4.5	4
Paisley	John Taylor	7,201	32.5	3
Rochdale	John Joseph Terrett	2,358	7.8	4
Rotherham	Edmund Smith Bardsley	564	2.2	4
Rother Valley	Ernest George Bearcroft	4,894	27.2	2
Stourbridge	Victor Fisher	6,690	28.8	3
Tottenham South	Albert Ernest Harvey	1,916	12.3	3
Wallsend	Matt Simm	10,246	50.9	1
Wolverhampton East	James A. Shaw	7,138	48.2	2
Walthamstow West	Charles Jesson	7,330	51.6	1

Some prominent members such as George Barnes were elected as Coalition Labour. Taylor ran as a joint NDP-Liberal candidate, and sat as a Coalition Liberal MP after election.

=== By-elections, 1918-1922 ===
Election	Candidate	Votes	Percentage	Position
1919 Chester-le-Street by-election	David Gilmour	5,313	22.9	2
1920 Louth by-election	Christopher Hatton Turnor	7,354	42.7	2

Turnour ran as a joint NDP-Conservative candidate.

== Other Reading ==
- David Butler and Gareth Butler, British Political Facts 7th Ed, 1900-1994
