= Frederick Pethick-Lawrence, 1st Baron Pethick-Lawrence =

British politician, editor (1871–1961)

The Right Honourable The Lord Pethick-Lawrence PC
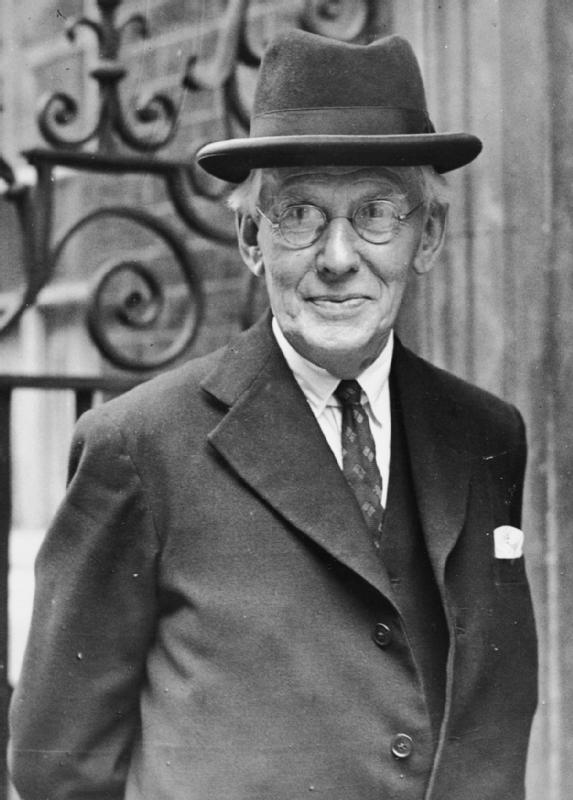
- Lord Pethick-Lawrence at 10 Downing Street (1945)

Leader of the Opposition
- In office 21 January 1942 – February 1942
- Monarch: George VI
- Prime Minister: Winston Churchill
- Preceded by: Hastings Lees-Smith
- Succeeded by: Arthur Greenwood

Financial Secretary to the Treasury
- In office 11 June 1929 – 24 August 1931
- Monarch: George V
- Prime Minister: Ramsay MacDonald
- Preceded by: Arthur Samuel
- Succeeded by: Walter Elliot

Secretary of State for India and Burma
- In office 3 August 1945 – 17 April 1947
- Monarch: George VI
- Prime Minister: Clement Attlee
- Preceded by: Leo Amery
- Succeeded by: The Earl of Listowel

Personal details
- Born: Frederick William Lawrence; 28 December 1871 London, England
- Died: 10 September 1961 (aged 89) Hendon, London, England
- Party: Labour
- Spouses: Emmeline Pethick (m. 1901; died 1954) Helen Millar Craggs (m. 1957)
- Education: Trinity College, Cambridge

Frederick William Pethick-Lawrence, 1st Baron Pethick-Lawrence (né Lawrence; 28 December 1871 – 10 September 1961) was a British Labour politician who campaigned for women's suffrage.

== Background and education ==
Born in London as Frederick William Lawrence, he was the son of wealthy Unitarians who were members of the Liberal Party. Three of his father's brothers, William, James, and Edwin, were politically active in various roles, including as Lord Mayor of London and as members of parliament. Frederick was educated at Wixenford, Eton, and Trinity College, Cambridge, where he was a member of Cambridge University Liberal Club. He gained a B.A. with first class honours in mathematics and physics. In 1896 he published the paper "Factorisation of numbers": this contained probably the first published description of an automated, mechanical prime sieve, and was to inspire the construction of the first such machine by 1919. In 1897 he was made a fellow of Trinity College, but he gave up his fellowship in 1903 and then went on a world tour. After returning to England he became a barrister.

== Political career ==
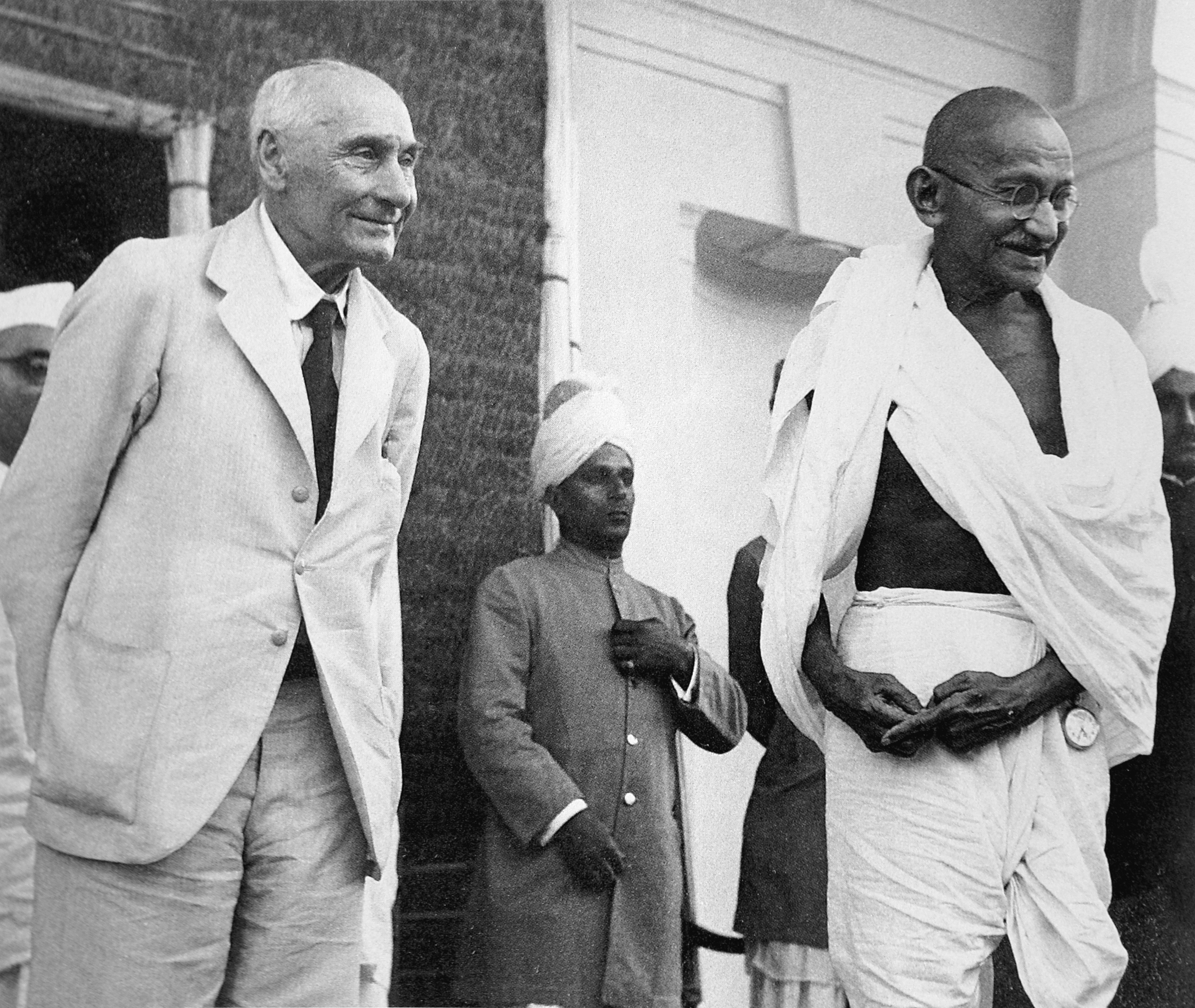
Lord Pethick-Lawrence with Gandhi in 1946

Lawrence met and fell in love with Emmeline Pethick, an active socialist and campaigner for women's votes. They finally married in 1901 after Lawrence converted to socialism. They kept separate bank accounts and they both took the surname 'Pethick Lawrence' (later Pethick-Lawrence). He published various left-wing newspapers, including Votes for Women and became involved in the Labour Party. His involvement in the Women's Social and Political Union (WSPU), on behalf of women's rights, led to him serving a nine-month prison sentence in 1912, following Christabel Pankhurst's window-smashing campaign, even though he had disagreed with that form of action; because of his disagreement, indeed, he was expelled from the WSPU by Emmeline Pankhurst and Christabel. On account of his prison sentence he was expelled from the Reform Club. Early in the First World War Pethick-Lawrence joined with others in founding the Union of Democratic Control (UDC), a leading anti-war organisation of which he became Treasurer. After acceptance by a Tribunal in Dorking in 1918, he worked on a farm in Sussex as a conscientious objector.

In 1923 Pethick-Lawrence was elected Member of Parliament (MP) for Leicester West, and was Financial Secretary to the Treasury from 1929 until the formation of the National Government in 1931; in the ensuing general election and the rout of the Labour Party he lost his seat. He was elected for Edinburgh East in 1935 and sworn of the Privy Council in 1937. For a short period in January and February 1942 he acted as Leader of the Opposition to the coalition government. In 1945 Pethick-Lawrence was elevated to the peerage as Baron Pethick-Lawrence, of Peaslake in the County of Surrey. From 1945 to 1947 he was Secretary of State for India and Burma, with a seat in the cabinet, and was involved in the negotiations that led to India's independence in 1947. Prime Minister Clement Attlee, however, made all the government's major decisions regarding India.

== Personal life ==
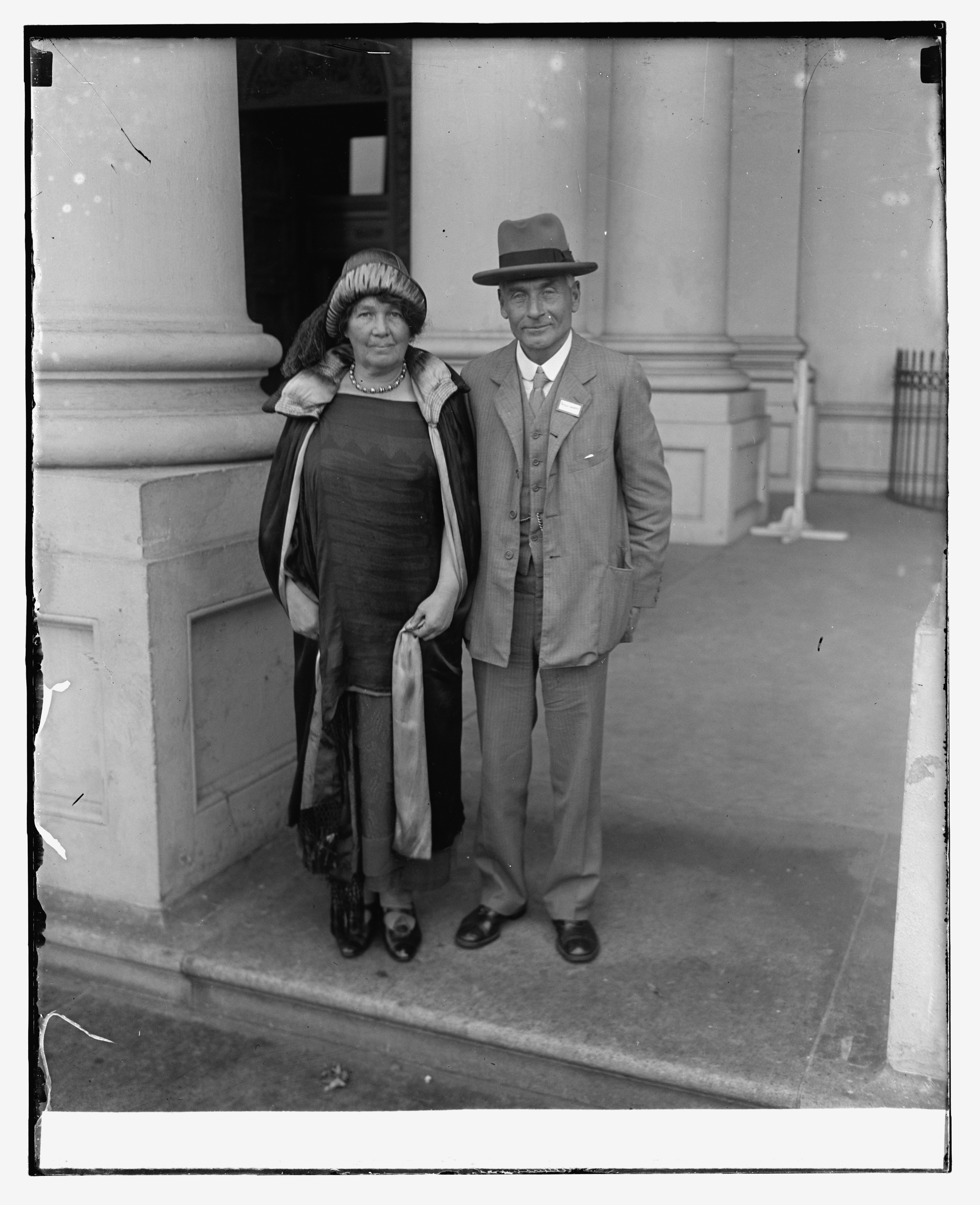
Pethick-Lawrence and his wife Emmeline Pethick-Lawrence in 1925

His first wife, Emmeline, Lady Pethick-Lawrence, died in 1954. Lord Pethick-Lawrence later married Helen Craggs in 1957. He died at Hendon, London, in September 1961, aged 89.

In 1976 the historian, Brian Harrison, conducted various interviews related to Frederick and Emmeline Pethwick-Lawrence as part of the Suffrage Interviews project, titled Oral evidence on the suffragette and suffragist movements: the Brian Harrison interviews. Elizabeth Kempster was employed as their housekeeper in 1945 following an interview at Lincoln's Inn, and worked at their home, Fourways, in Surrey, where Sylvia Pankhurst was a frequent visitor. She talks about his interest in people, sport and health, and the effect his trip to India had on him. Gladys Groom-Smith, interviewed in June and August 1976, was secretary to the Pethick-Lawrence's, working alongside Esther Knowles who trained her. She talks about his background, childhood and personality as well as his concerns when Secretary of State for India. Harrison also interviewed the niece of Esther Knowles, who recalled her Aunt's relationship with the Pethick-Lawrence's and her work for them.

His older sister Annie Jane Lawrence (1863-1953) was responsible for building the open-air Arts and Crafts school The Cloisters in Letchworth Garden City.

== Posthumous recognition ==
His name and picture (and those of 58 other women's suffrage supporters) are on the plinth of the statue of Millicent Fawcett in Parliament Square, London, unveiled in 2018.

Parliament of the United Kingdom
Preceded by Alfred Hill	Member of Parliament for Leicester West; 1923–1931	Succeeded by Ernest Harold Pickering
Preceded by David Marshall Mason	Member of Parliament for Edinburgh East; 1935–1945	Succeeded by George Thomson
Political offices
Preceded by Arthur Samuel	Financial Secretary to the Treasury; 1929–1931	Succeeded by Walter Elliot
Preceded by Hastings Lees-Smith	Leader of the Opposition; 1942	Succeeded by Arthur Greenwood
Preceded by Leo Amery	Secretary of State for India and Burma; 1945–1947	Succeeded by The Earl of Listowel
Peerage of the United Kingdom
New creation	Baron Pethick-Lawrence; 1945–1961	Extinct
