= British Workers League =

- Chairman: James Seddon
- Secretary: Victor Fisher
- Founded: 1916
- Dissolved: 1927
- Preceded by: Socialist National Defence Committee
- Newspaper: British Citizen and Empire Worker; Empire Citizen
- Ideology: British Unionism
- Political position: Right-wing

The British Workers League was a 'patriotic labour' group which was pro-British Empire. Founded originally as the Socialist National Defence Committee, the league operated from May 1916 to 1927.

The league's origins lay in a split in the British Socialist Party in 1915, primarily over the need to win the First World War. A group, dissenting from the pacifism of the Labour Party, would be formed by Victor Fisher and supported "the eternal idea of nationality" and aimed to promote "socialist measures in the war effort". Fisher, and Alexander M. Thompson, would form the Socialist National Defence Committee. This group, included H. G. Wells and Robert Blatchford.

In 1916 the Committee transformed itself into the British Workers National League, subsequently shortened to the British Workers League. It executive included Edward Carson, Leo Maxse, H.G. Wells and fifteen Labour MPs including Will Crooks and John Hodge. Hodge would preside as chairman, and James Andrew Seddon was chairman of the organization committee. The league's first public meeting was held at the Queen's Hall in London on 10 May 1916, and its guest speaker and big advocate was Prime Minister Billy Hughes of Australia.

Describing itself as a "patriotic labour" group, it focused its activities on support for the war. The Rev. A.W. Gough, Prebendary of St. Paul's Cathedral, was chairman of the British Workers League for London and the Home Counties. Edward Robertshaw Hartley was also a member. The Labour MP Stephen Walsh and the Liberal MP Leo Chiozza Money were vice presidents. During the war period the British Workers League sometimes threatened to break up pacifist meetings.

The League received funding from Viscount Milner and had links to the British Commonwealth Union. The first issue of the league's newspaper, the British Citizen and Empire Worker, published the party's platform:

A Standard Living Wage for Industrial and Agricultural Workers;
The Revival and Development of National Agriculture;
Adequate Pensions for all Our Disabled Soldiers and Sailors;
Victory in the War to be followed by the Expropriation of Enemy Economic and Industrial Interests Within the Empire;
National or Municipal Control of National Monopolies and Vital Industries;
The Full Exploitation of the Natural Resources of the Empire in the Interests of the Whole People.

The league's secretary, Victor Fisher, stressed the need for 'respectable' socialism, noting that, "The British Commonwealth still remains the highest and finest embodiment of social life which men had yet developed...the main business of our public life and of our public activities...must be..To unite by every possible link the scattered states of the British Commonwealth." As such, it was an advocate for Imperial Preference.

In 1916, the newspaper severely criticized Prime Minister Asquith, nicknamed "Squiff", for drinking too much, allowing no crisis to interfere with his two hours of bridge every evening, and, while hundreds of thousands died, spending leisurely nonworking weekends at friends' country houses. He even raised eyebrows on one occasion by attending a Saturday morning meeting at 10 Downing Street in his golf clothes.

1917 was the high water mark for the British Worker's League, with over 150 branches and in open opposition with the Labour Party, and its decision to send politician Arthur Henderson to Stockholm for an international labour conference supported by communists. The conference proved to be Henderson's downfall.

In 1918 the British Workers League stood candidates in the general election as the National Democratic and Labour Party. From 1921 to 1927 the League published a newspaper entitled The Empire Citizen.

== Video ==
- British Workers League in Hyde Park (1917)
- British Workers' League & March video newsreel film (1914-1918)
- British Workers' League - celebrate France's Day in Hyde Park

== Sources ==
- The Times, digital archive
- Thompson, J. Lee., A Wider Patriotism: Alfred Milner and the British Empire, Pickering: London, 2007
- Hochschild, Adam, To End All Wars: A Story of Loyalty and Rebellion: 1914-1918, Boston: Houghton, 2011
