= Helen Millar Craggs =

British suffragette

The Right Honourable The Lady Pethick-Lawrence
- Born: 1888; Westminster, London, England
- Died: 1969 (aged 80–81); Victoria, British Columbia, Canada
- Education: Roedean School
- Occupations: Pharmacist; teacher
- Organization: Women's Social and Political Union
- Known for: Suffragette activism
- Spouses: Duncan Alexander McCrombie (m. 1914; died 1936) Frederick Pethick-Lawrence, 1st Baron Pethick-Lawrence (m. 1957; died 1961)

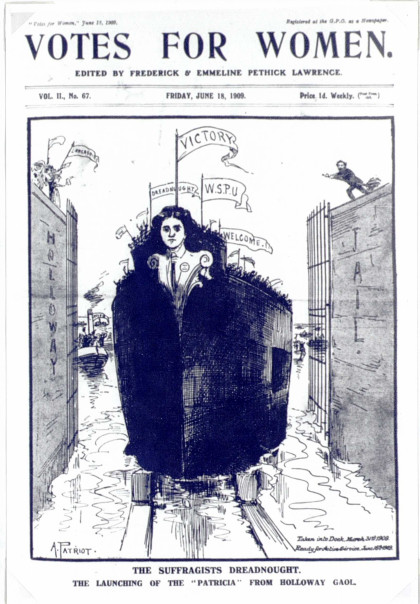
Votes for Women newspaper

Helen Millar Pethick-Lawrence, Baroness Pethick-Lawrence (née Craggs; 1888–1969) was a British suffragette and pharmacist.

== Early life and education ==
Craggs was born in Westminster, London on 24 November 1888. Her father was Sir John Craggs, an accountant who donated money for tropical medicine research, and her mother was Helen Craggs (née Millar). She had seven siblings.

Craggs was educated at Roedean School in the Sussex Downs. She wished to study medicine, but her father refused that idea and Craggs went to teach science and physical exercise at her former boarding school for a time. Although Craggs' mother supported suffragism and was a lead committee member in the national and Kensington Conservative and Unionist Women's Franchise Association, she deplored activism.

== Activism ==
Craggs used a pseudonym 'Helen Millar' (perhaps to protect her family and her teaching post) when she joined the Women's Social and Political Union activists during the Peckham election in 1908. She chalked pavements and handed out campaigning literature on the women's suffrage. Craggs assisted Flora Drummond with the aim of ousting Winston Churchill in the successful campaign to wipe out his majority on this and other equality themes during the election in Manchester. Churchill was then put forward for the Dundee seat, where WSPU were ready to challenge him again

Within two years, Craggs had to leave an unsympathetic home to become a full time WSPU organiser at 25 shillings per month, living in rented property in Bloomsbury. Craggs was joined at the Women's Press shop by Mary Richardson who spoke about the obscene abuse whispered by male 'bystanders' and others who came in to tear up the suffrage materials.

The Museum of London has an image of Craggs on a horse drawn carriage distributing the Votes for Women newspaper.

Craggs was close to Emmeline Pankhurst's son Harry, who suffered from polio, and visited his nursing home throughout and was with him when he died in January 1910. Craggs became the organiser, after Grace Roe, at Brixton WSPU branch, and later at Hampstead. Within the movement, Craggs befriended Ethel Smyth, Evelyn Sharp and Beatrice Harraden. Craggs also spent time with Marie Newby in Devon influencing the campaign there. Craggs was also in Wales and identified as the protester who jumped out at the Home Secretary at Llandaff Cathedral during a Royal Visit at Cathays Park saying 'it was a shame he was going about the country while suffragettes where starving in prison'

In November 1910, Craggs went to the Paragon Theatre, Whitechapel at 2a.m. to hide in the freezing roof space overnight before Lloyd George was due to speak. Craggs broke through the crowd from her hideout shouting at the Chancellor about women's rights, and was thrown down a stone staircase. A bystanding man who said, "women pay taxes too" was beaten.

Craggs became the first paid WSPU organiser for Peterborough in 1911, employed as Secretary until she departed in 1912 and was succeeded by Mrs Fordham. Also in 1912, Craggs participated in the Great Militant Protest window smashing campaign in London. Unlike before, when she was arrested she gave her real name. She was imprisoned in Holloway Prison and went on hunger strike. Cardiff University Archive has an image of Craggs from the Daily Sketch in 1912.

Later Craggs was arrested for carrying materials for causing arson, near Nuneham Courtney, the home of Government Cabinet member, Lewis Harcourt. WSPU insisted Craggs was acting alone, as this was the first threat to property. The incident was described in detail in court about two women hiring a canoe, and surprise encounter with a policeman, to whom Craggs said they were camping nearby and had come to 'look around the house'. The constable later identified Craggs, but the second woman (Norah Smyth) escaped and police found food and WSPU flag colours (white green and purple) and phone numbers of the property and the Oxford Fire Station. Craggs wore "a striking costume prominently displaying the suffragist colours" when she appeared in Bullingdon Petty Sessions court the next day and admitted her intent but would not give her name. Craggs was held in remand due to the seriousness of the crime (as 8 people were in the house) and sentenced at the Assizes court in Oxford, bailed at £1000, half was provided by Ethel Smyth. Craggs was sent for 9 months with hard labour in Oxford Prison, and wrote thanking Hugh Franklin for allegedly getting photographs of the property. Craggs was moved to Holloway Prison, again went on hunger strike and was force fed five times in two days and suffered internal and external bruising for 11 days then released due to her health. Lewis Harcourt gave £1000 donation to the League for Opposing Women's Suffrage.

== Post suffrage ==
Craggs moved to Dublin where she trained at the Rotunda Hospital as a midwife, married a London East End General practitioner, Duncan Alexander McCrombie, from Aberdeen. Her parents did not attend the wedding in 1914. Craggs trained as a pharmacist to support her husband's practice. Craggs was widowed in 1936, at a young age, starting in business making jigsaws as a means of earning income for her two children.

== Later life ==
After World War II, Craggs and her daughter emigrated to North America, settling in Canada, and saw Christabel Pankhurst sometimes in Los Angeles. Craggs returned to London and became a private secretary. She married, as his second wife, Frederick Pethick-Lawrence, 1st Baron Pethick-Lawrence, a long-standing suffrage movement leader and sponsor from Surrey, three years after his first wife suffragette Emmeline had died.

In 1969, Craggs, then Baroness Helen Pethick-Lawrence, died on 15 January in Victoria, British Columbia, Canada.
