= Socialist National Defence Committee =

- Abbreviation: SNDC
- Leader: Victor Fisher
- Founded: 1915
- Dissolved: 1918
- Split from: British Socialist Party (interventionist factions)
- Succeeded by: National Democratic and Labour Party
- Ideology: Socialism; British nationalism Left-interventionism; Left-wing nationalism Defencism; Anti-germanism
- Political position: Left-wing

The Socialist National Defence Committee also known as the Socialist National Defence League was a pro First World War socialist faction.

== History ==
The party's origins lay in the 1915 split by the right wing of the British Socialist Party, led by Victor Fisher, primarily over issues raised by the First World War, comprising the supporters of the failed leadership candidate Henry M. Hyndman. They supported "the eternal idea of nationality" and aimed to promote "socialist measures in the war effort". This group, including H. G. Wells and Robert Blatchford, formed the Socialist National Defence Committee.

They believed that it was desirable to support the United Kingdom in World War I against "Prussian militarism". They still maintained that they were a Marxist party. They were grouped around the newspaper Justice.

Elements later became part of Hyndman's National Socialist Party which affiliated with the Labour Party in 1918. They were to renounce vanguardism and see the Russian Revolution as a danger that in weakening the United Kingdom's war effort.

Other supporters joined the British Workers League, formed in March 1916, which in turn became part of the pro-coalition National Democratic and Labour Party, in May 1918.

Coinciding with the Socialist National Defence Committee was Lord Alfred Milner's leadership of the National Service League. Milner's strong position on conscription brought him into contact with Victor Fisher, through R. MacLeod, the Secretary of the National Service League. Through talks, Fisher decided to take up an, 'imperial labor' platform, based on Lord Milner's book, The Nation and the Empire. For his service, Waldorf Astor agreed to pay Fisher a salary of £660 a year for three years (£68,000 in 2020), and £1,000 a year (£104,000 in 2020) for advertising. After a name change, on 17 March 1916 The British Workers National League published its manifesto in the Clarion, on 25 August Fisher published the first edition of its weekly newspaper, The British Citizen and Empire Worker, and by the end of the year the league claimed to have 70 branches throughout the country.

The British Workers National League changed its name to the National Democratic and Labour Party in May 1918, it merged with the National Liberal Party in 1922, and it reemerged as the Empire Citizens' League in 1925, and likely dissolved toward the end of 1927.

== Sources ==
- Archive.org (sign up to view sources and citations) Link
- The Times digital archives
- Lockwood, P. A. Milner's Entry into the War Cabinet, December 1916 The Historical Journal, vol. 7, no. 1, 1964. JSTOR
- Milner, Alfred, The Nation and the Empire, London: Constable, 1913
- Thompson, J. Lee, A Wider Patriotism, Alfred Milner and the British Empire, London: Pickering, 2007
- Marlowe, John, Milner: Apostle of Empire, London: Hamish Hamilton, 1976

== Other Reading ==
- Hochschild, Adam, To End All Wars: A Story of Loyalty and Rebellion: 1914-1918, Boston: Houghton, 2011, pgs. 177-179
