= Braunstone Town =

Town and civil parish in England

Coordinates: 52.616°N 1.175°W

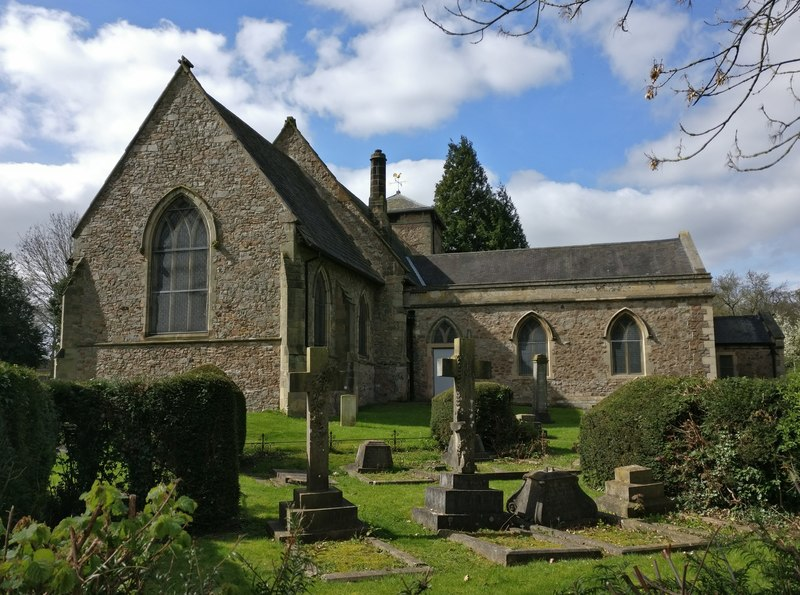
- St Peter's Church, Braunstone Town

- Location within Leicestershire
- Population: 16,850
- District: Blaby
- Shire county: Leicestershire
- Region: East Midlands
- Country: England
- Sovereign state: United Kingdom
- Post town: LEICESTER
- Postcode district: LE3
- Dialling code: 0116
- Police: Leicestershire
- Fire: Leicestershire
- Ambulance: East Midlands
- UK Parliament: Mid Leicestershire

Braunstone is a town and civil parish in the district of Blaby in Leicestershire, England. At the 2011 census the population of the town was 16,850.

Braunstone is mentioned in the Domesday Book of 1086, giving a population of "two sokemen and four villeins". The village remained a small settlement (population 238 in 1921) until 1925 when the Leicester Corporation compulsorily purchased the bulk of the Winstanley Braunstone Hall estate.

It is just outside the city boundary of Leicester, and the part of the old civil parish now inside the city boundary is also called Braunstone. This part of the parish, which contains a large council estate, was detached in 1935 from the Blaby district and Braunstone Parish to become part of the county borough of Leicester, hence the present split. The use of the name Braunstone Town is more recent, and is an attempt by Braunstone Town Council to distinguish their village from the council estate of the same name.

Braunstone Town is adjacent to the M1 motorway (junction 21) and is adjoined by the Meridian Business and Leisure Parks, and the Fosse Shopping Park and Grove Triangle retail outlets.

Although the parish has no railway station of its own, Leicester station is accessible by frequent bus services operated by Arriva East Midlands and First Leicester into Leicester City Centre.

== History ==
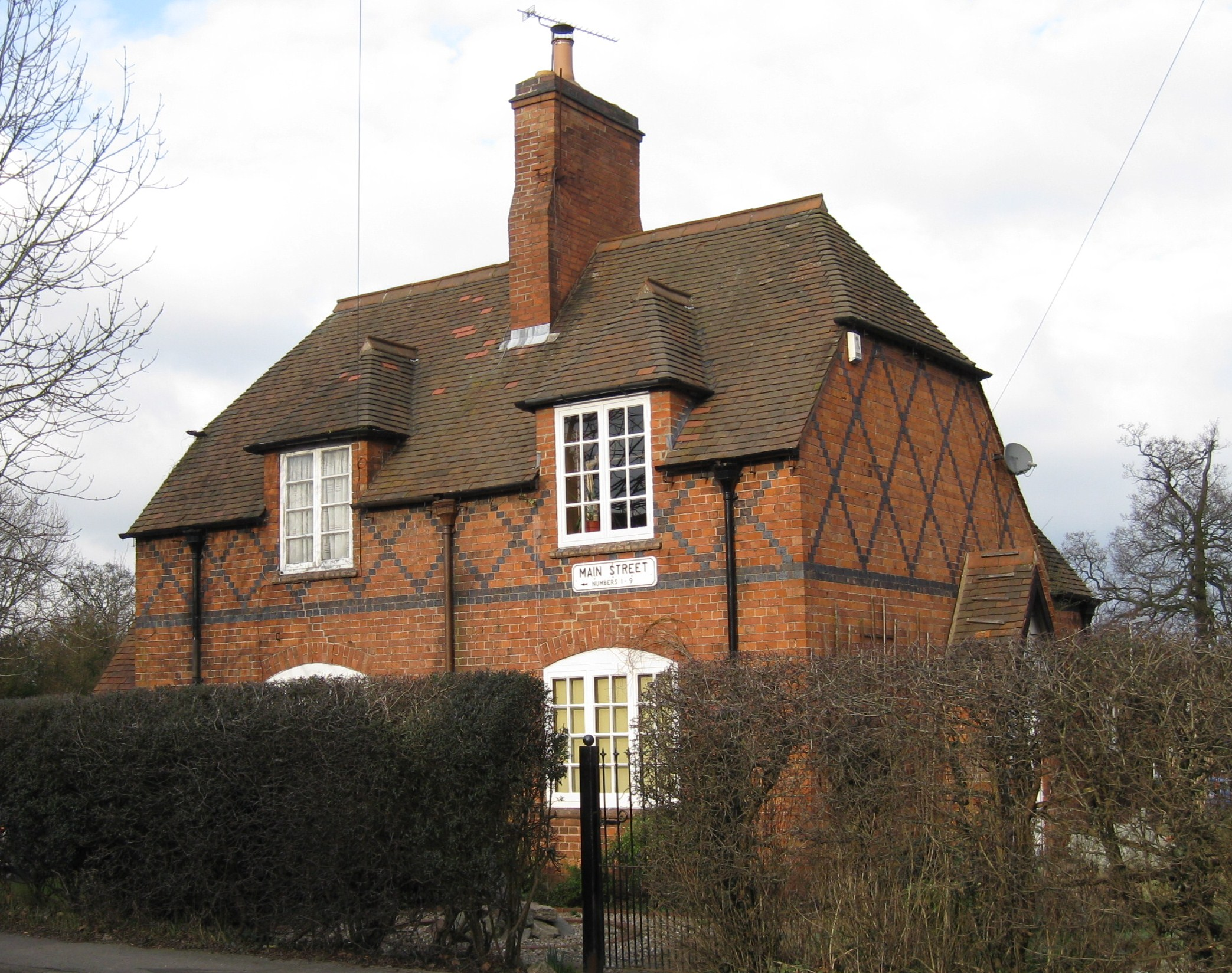
House on Main Street

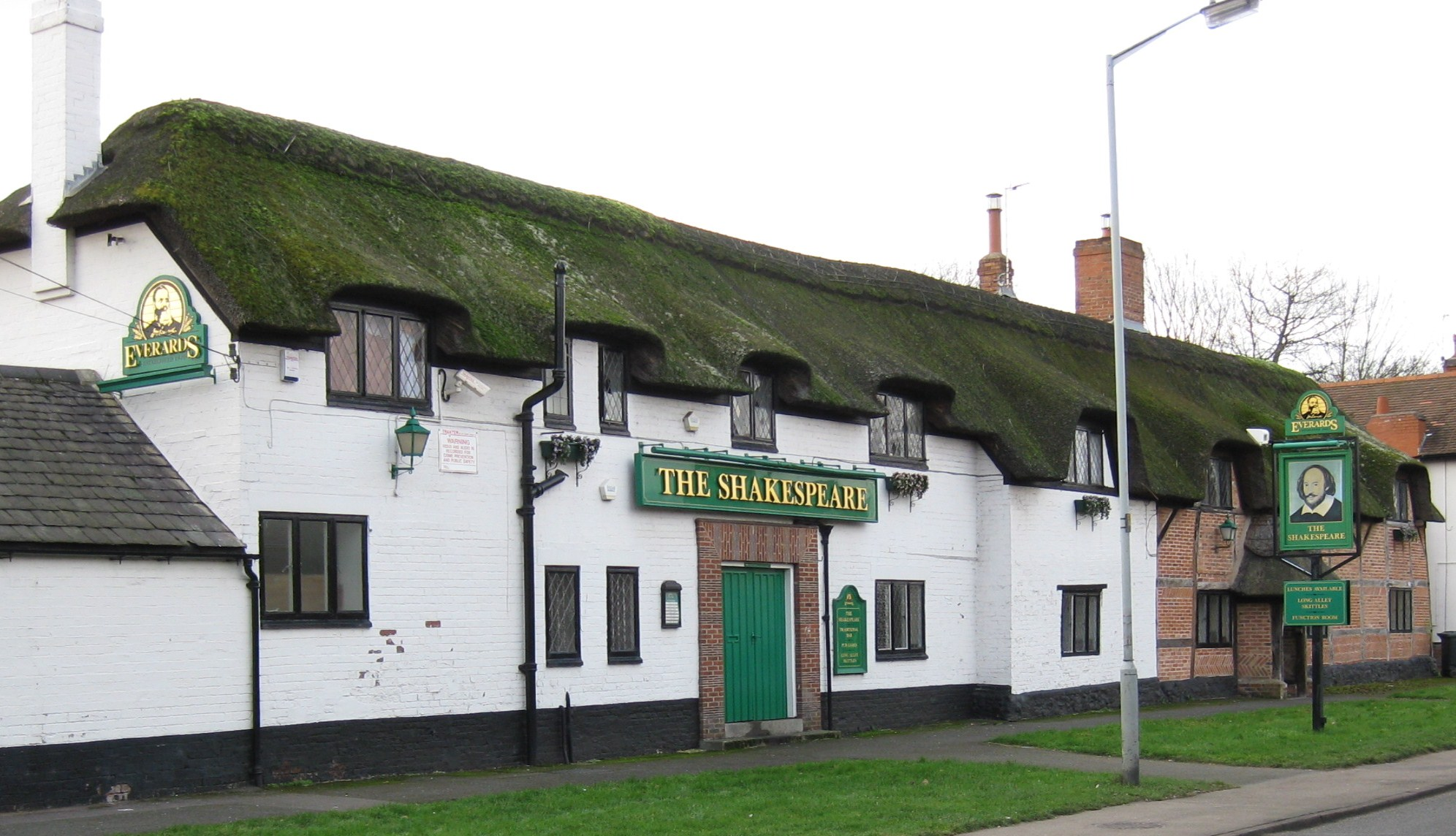
The Shakespeare public house

The name 'Braunstone' means 'the farm/settlement of Brant'.

The earliest dated human find recorded is a Bronze Age axe (about 1000 BC) found in 1893.

Next came the building of the Roman road from Leicester, through the site of the Narborough Road South to the High Cross near Sharnford. It is also evident that the Vikings of the early or later period had settlements in or near Braunstone, hence the nearby names of Viking origin – Lubbesthorpe, Countesthorpe, Enderby, Elmesthorpe, Cosby, Kilby, Kirby etc. Throughout this period Braunstone was covered with forest (as were most county areas surrounding) in what was known as Leicester Forest. Like most forests, these were composed of a series of large woods containing small early settlements or hamlets inter-connected by rough trackways – from which most of our public field paths owe their origin.

Braunstone is mentioned in the Domesday Book (1086) where it is referred to as BRANTESTONE or BRANSTUN.

"Braunstone – six plough lands, all but for oxgangs, in Braunstone which is the reign of The Confessor had been valued at twenty shillings, were worth sixty shillings at the general survey and were then held by the son of Robert Burdet. The land was equal to four ploughs, one was in Demesne, and four Bondmen; and two socmen and five villains, with one border, had two ploughs. There was a wood five furlongs long and three broad, and there were 5 acres (20,000 m^{2}) of meadow. Two socmen abiding in Braunstone had five oxgangs of land in Lubbesthorpe; and jointly with ten villains and six borders in that lordship had two ploughs and five ploughing oxen.

The above lands were held by Robert Burdet under Hugh de Grandmesnil, one of William I's most powerful barons.

Note:

- A ploughland or carucate = about 80 to 120 acres (0.32 to 0.49 km^{2}) of land.
- Socman = Scandinavian Villein = Peasant or serf.

A copy of the Domesday Book is displayed at Braunstone Civic Centre.

The first Lord of the Manor was de Grandmesnil. At this time the village consisted of 8 households and was worth about 60 shillings.

The Harcourt or Horecut family held the over-riding interest in the estate from the 13th to the 16th centuries. A survey taken in 1299 showed a growth to 24 households in the village.

The 14th century saw several outbreaks of the Black Death in the area. Its effect on Braunstone is not recorded, but nearby Glenfield was seriously affected. At this time the Leicester Forest extended into Braunstone as far as Bendbow Spinney.

Several portions of Braunstone were sold off in the late 16th century. 150 acres (0.61 km^{2}) of arable land were sold to the Manners family in 1579 and a further 100 acres (0.40 km^{2}) went to the Bennett family ten years later. 240 acres (0.97 km^{2}) of land were converted to pasture in 1596 by the Hastings family, who owned the estate at that time.

Woodlands were gradually converted to pastures, mainly for sheep – being then the more profitable husbandry. Leicester Forest was fully enclosed in 1628. Villagers of Braunstone were compensated for the loss of Forestry Rights.

=== 18th century onwards ===
The 18th century was a period of prosperity for Braunstone. The largest estate of the time was owned by Abraham Compton and comprised 68 ewes, 25 lambs, 14 cows, 6 heifers, 4 calves and 6 pigs.

In 1750 James Winstanley III tried to sink a pit on the manor. His attempts were thwarted when his bore hole was filled with stones by intruders, thought to be from local mining districts.

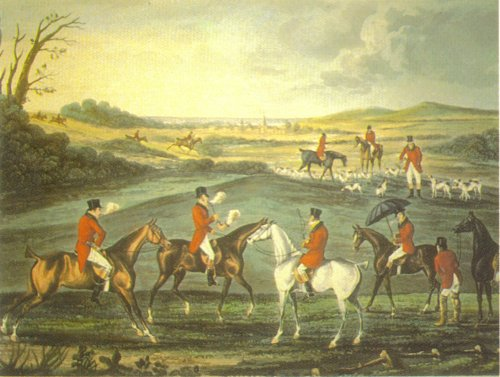
Rendezvous at Braunstone by Charles Loraine Smith

In the 1820s Braunstone was known as a place to go fox-hunting. Charles Loraine Smith painted a set of parodies known as the "Smoking Hunt" which pokes fun at the fashionable sport of hunting here.

Braunstone remained a village with various tenanted farmsteads until, in 1925, the Leicester Corporation compulsorily purchased the bulk of the Winstanley Braunstone Hall estate for £116,500.

Braunstone's population rose from 238 in 1921 to 6,997 in 1931.

In 1935 the part of Braunstone on the city side of Braunstone Lane became the North Braunstone Ward of the City of Leicester, and the parish of Braunstone in compensation had part of Lubbesthorpe added to its boundary. It mostly consists of council housing built between 1925 and 1940.

During World War Two Braunstone Park was put to agricultural use. Wheat, barley, and potatoes were grown, and sheep allowed to graze. What is now the Memorial Gardens was used as a military camp, occupied first by the British Army and later by the American 82nd Airborne Division troops. After the war, due to the severe housing shortage, people were allowed to occupy the camp until they found homes of their own.

By the 1990s, however, Braunstone was perhaps the most troubled part of Leicester, with crime rates and unemployment among the highest in the city. In April 1994, The Independent newspaper reported that unemployment on the estate was above 25% and was blighted by youth gangs engaging in anti-social behaviour.

The area is also known for housing the head office of British Shoe Corporation on Sunningdale Road, from 1965 to 1999. A plaque on the corner of Sunningdale Road shows the site's history and connection with British Shoe Corporation (BSC as it was known) and the founder of BSC, Charles Clore.

== Braunstone Town Council ==
The Braunstone Town Council is the parish council level local council of the parish of Braunstone Town. The Town Council was established in 1977 when the former parish council resolved to change its status to that of a town council.

The Town Council has 21 elected members (i.e. councillors) who are elected for terms of office of four years.

Braunstone Town Council was the winner of the National Association of Local Council's Star Council of the Year in 2023.

== Braunstone Hall ==
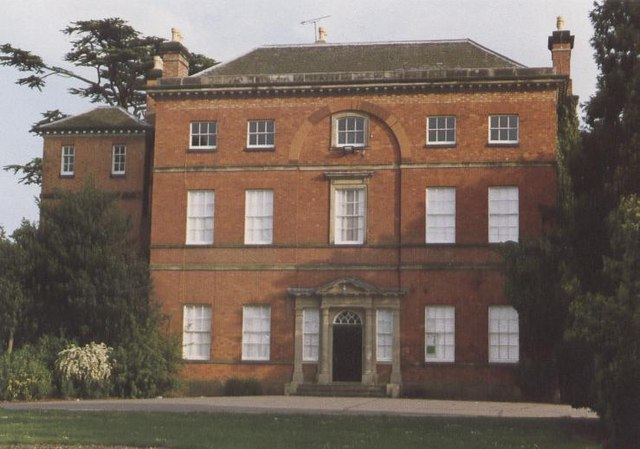
Braunstone Hall, c.1994

Braunstone Hall is a Grade II listed building in the centre of Braunstone Park. It was built in 1776 for the Winstanley family, lords of the manor and the main land owners in the village of Braunstone. In many ways the Hall resembles town houses like 17 Friar Lane. It is built in similar materials and has similar Classical proportions and decoration. But, while the Friar Lane houses were lived in by wealthy merchants and professional people or were used as town houses by landed families, Braunstone Hall was the centre of a country estate passed on through the Winstanley family from generation to generation. As country houses go, Braunstone Hall is fairly unassuming. It was not designed by one of the many fashionable country house architects of the day but by local builder and Leicester politician, William Oldham. He used red brick and Swithland slate, common local materials. The central doorway and windows are emphasised just as they are at 17 Friar Lane. Here they are set in an arched recess reaching up to the top of the facade. The Hall has a slightly less elaborate frontage to the Park at the back and, inside, Classical columns in the entrance hall and an elegant staircase. Building has always been a dangerous occupation and the building records show that a stonemason and a labourer were killed in the construction of Braunstone Hall.

Around the Hall, the Winstanleys had a Park laid out with a lake and gardens. As a wealthy family they had horses and carriages which were kept in the stable block next to the house. These buildings did not share the refinement of the house and were more like farm buildings, but they were still carefully designed, with fine brickwork arches and decoration at the eaves. The walled garden, restored and beautifully planted by the city council, once contained fruit trees, serving the household both as a source of food and as a place to stroll. There are also reminders of the Winstanleys in the village. They commissioned one of the most famous of Victorian Architects, William Butterfield, to design cottages for estate workers at Cressida Place and in Main Street. Both groups of cottages were built in 1859. Butterfield modelled the houses on traditional buildings and used local materials but their design has a deliberate, thought-out quality which suggests that it was the work of an architect.

The parsonage, built in 1864, and the village school of 1867, were paid for by the Winstanleys. In 1902 parts of the estate adjacent to Narborough Road were offered for sale as building plots. Braunstone was greatly changed in the 1930s when the Winstanley estate was bought by the Leicester Corporation, partly as land for new housing. Initially held by the Parks Department with the Hall being used as a junior school with over 600 places from 1932, the Hall and two acres of surrounding land were purchased by the Leicester Education Committee in 1939 for £3,500, allowing the construction of an assembly hall and further alterations to the building.

The Hall was used as a school until 1996, after which it fell into disrepair. In 2013 plans were unveiled for the restoration of the building and its conversion into a hotel, restaurant, wedding venue and conference centre. Now renamed Winstanley House, the hall operates as a hotel and wedding venue.

== St Peter's Church ==
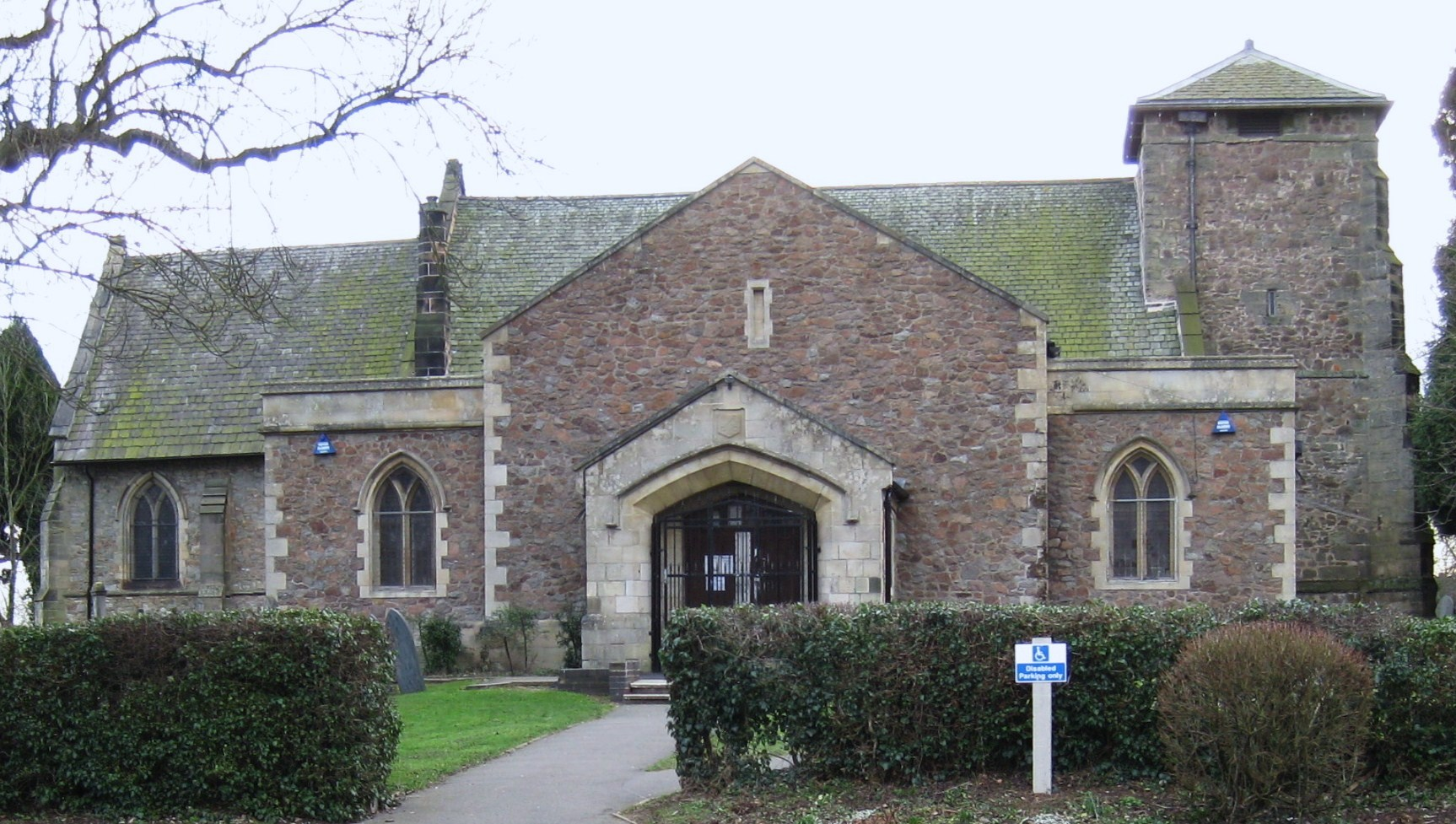
St Peter's Church

The first record of a church is 1168; the earliest parts of the existing church date from the 12th or 13th century. It is built of limestone and consists of a short square tower, nave and chancel. It was re-roofed in 1867 and had some minor refurbishment in the 20th century. In 1937 Braunstone became a parish in its own right, and St Peter's became the parish church with its own vicar.

== Arms ==
Coat of arms of Braunstone Town

Notes
Granted 1976.
Crest
On a wreath Argent and Gules a stag statant resting its dexter leg on a mound of brown stones Proper.
Escutcheon
Gules on a fess wavy Azure frimriated Or between in chief a maunch Argent between two roundels Or and in base a cross formy Argent two shovellers Argent.
Motto
Spectemur Agendo (Let Us Be Judged By Our Actions)
