= Victor Fisher =

British political activist

Frederick Victor Fisher (10 July 1870 – 30 January 1954) was a British political activist.

Fisher was born in London; his mother was English, and his father was Hungarian. He was privately educated in London and Paris, then worked in journalism and banking in Paris before moving to Manchester, again to work in journalism. Although he was not a pacifist, he was strongly opposed to the Second Boer War, and this led him to become interested in socialism. He became secretary of the National Democratic League and joined the Fabian Society, and then the Marxist Social Democratic Federation (SDF).

The SDF became the British Socialist Party (BSP), and Fisher initially became a member. However, he was upset that it would not support his proposals of a citizen army and expansion of the Royal Navy, and became an informant to MI5. In 1915, he led a right-wing split, the Socialist National Defence Committee. This attracted some prominent members, including H. G. Wells and Robert Blatchford. The following year, a group around the leadership of the BSP formed the new National Socialist Party, which attracted some Defence Committee members. Fisher instead refounded Defence Committee as the British Workers League, which at its peak included fifteen Labour Party Members of Parliament.

Fisher worked with George Nicoll Barnes to reconstitute the British Workers' League as the National Democratic and Labour Party (NDP), and stood candidates at the 1918 general election. Fisher stood for the party in Stourbridge, and received the Coalition Coupon, but he took only 28.8% of the vote and was not elected. His Labour opponent was the woman trades unionist, Mary Macarthur, one of only seventeen women candidates to take the opportunity of standing in the first parliamentary election in which women could be nominated as parliamentary candidates. Fisher's campaign against Macarthur was particularly unpleasant. He received substantial secret funding through Viscount Milner and worked closely with the Unionist Chamberlain family in Birmingham. The non-Coalition Liberal candidate John Wilson, a local industrialist, with whom the Chamberlains had a long running feud, won.

In 1919 Fisher fell out with other figures in the NDP, and left the group. He soon joined the Conservative Party, leading its Conservative Workers' Union. He stood for the party in Stratford West Ham at the 1923 general election, but was again unsuccessful. He then withdrew from formal politics, but subsequently led a variety of organisations, including the Society for the Study of Religions, Anglo-French Alliance, and National Organization of Ratepayers.
