= Narborough Road =

Street in Leicester, United Kingdom

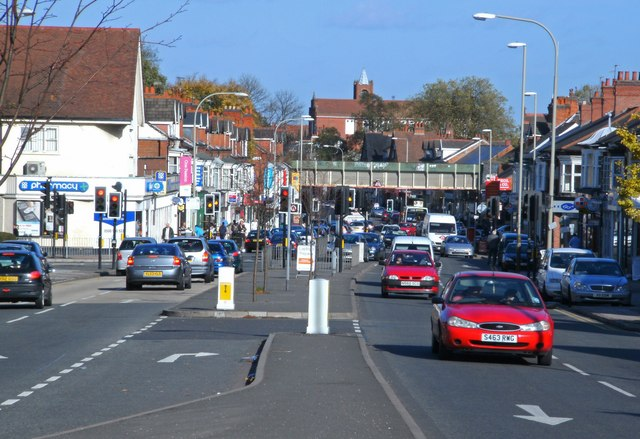
- Narborough Road, October 2008
- Interactive map of Narborough Road
- Former name: A46
- Part of: A5460
- Length: 2.68 km (1.67 mi)
- Location: Leicester
- Postal code: LE3
- Coordinates: 52.6259°N 1.1515°W
- south end: Braunstone Lane junction
- Major junctions: Upperton Road, Braunstone Gate
- north end: A47 King Richard's Road

Construction
- Construction start: c. 48 AD (Roman)

Other
- Known for: Most diverse shopping street

Narborough Road is a street in the Westcotes and Rowley Fields districts of the city of Leicester, UK. Following the route of the Ancient Roman Fosse Way, today it is the principal route between Leicester City Centre and the M1 and M69 motorway, and a busy residential and shopping street. In February 2016, it was named the UK's "most diverse" road in a research project by the London School of Economics (LSE).

== Geography ==
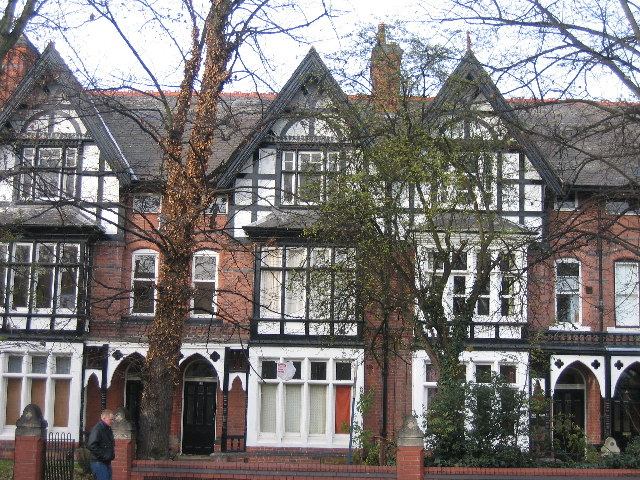
Victorian housing in Narborough Road

Narborough Road is a 2.7 kilometres (1.7 miles)-long road on the west of Leicester. It stretches from Braunstone Lane/Middleton Street in the south to King Richard's Road (A46) in the north, and runs through the Braunstone Park & Rowley Fields and the Westcotes electoral wards of Leicester. The road is a section of the A5460 leading from the M1 motorway towards the city centre. According to the 2015 Index of Multiple Deprivation, Narborough Road is located within areas that are among the 10–20% most deprived in England.

== History ==
During the period of Roman Britain, Narborough Road formed part of the Fosse Way, the longest of Britain's Roman roads, which passed through Leicester and linked Exeter in the south-west to Lincoln on the east coast. The route left Leicester (then a regional town known by its Roman name Ratae Corieltauvorum) via the West Bridge before heading south-west down the Fosse Way for some 270 kilometres (170 miles) towards Exeter, and was the main route towards the nearby city of Coventry. In 1769, when a Turnpike road was established by act of parliament, it chose to connect to the road already running from Hinckley to Coventry, and thus took a more northerley line, via the Hinckley Road. The Fosse Way route was also included in the same act, but only over the 7 kilometres (4.3 miles) to Narborough. It would appear to be this that gave the name to the short stretch of toll-road serving local traffic through much of the 19th century.

By the 1870s the railways had become established as the main movers of goods traffic. This undermined the economics of the tollroads, and disturnpiking was in full swing across the country. The Turnpike act for the Narborough Road finally expired in November 1874, ending any responsibility for the upkeep of the road. The turnpike had its northern end where it met Braunstone Gate and Hinckley Road. An early suburb for Leicester grew up around these three roads, west of the river, and by this period terraced housing was being built out from both sides of the Narborough Road. The boundaries of the city had undergone a major expansion in 1835, so the town corporation became responsible for a one-mile length of the former turnpike, the town boundary being close to what would later become the junction with Evesham Road and Fullhurst Road, but at that time was still fields.

During the final decades of the 19th century, industries that manufactured products such as footwear, hosiery and knitwear began to grow in Leicester. As a result, the local population increased rapidly as more workers moved to the city from places such as Coventry and Northampton. This, in turn, stimulated the building of new houses and new tramway infrastructure on Narborough Road. In the mid-20th century, Narborough Road was closer to being a residential area; it then became a fashion street, with its retail units mainly selling clothes and fabrics. The opening of a number of restaurants and bars brought in students from the city's two universities, University of Leicester and De Montfort University. As of December 2015, 204 of the 222 units along the street (92%) are non-residential.

== Notable buildings ==
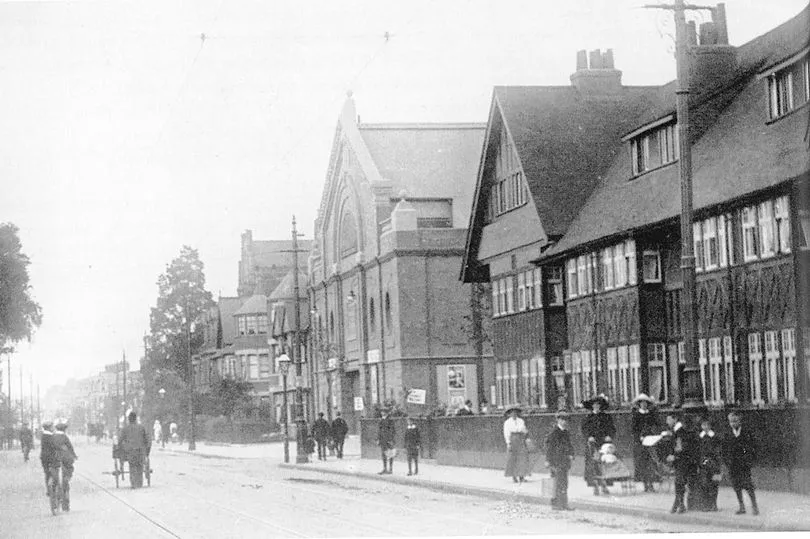
Narborough Road in the 1910s. The Olympia Theatre can be seen in the centre.

The Olympia Theatre (also known as the Olympia Electric Theatre and the Olympia Picture Theatre) was a cinema on Narborough Road, located on the corner of Walton Street. Opened in 1913, it was built by the Loughborough architect Albert King, and could hold up to 1,100 attendees. The cinema was initially ran by Frank D. Gray for over 20 years, until he was replaced by Fred Trueman Towers, who managed the building during World War II. The first sound film to be screened at the Olympia was The Singing Fool, starring Al Jolson, in 1929. The cinema closed in 1959, to be demolished to make way for a garage.

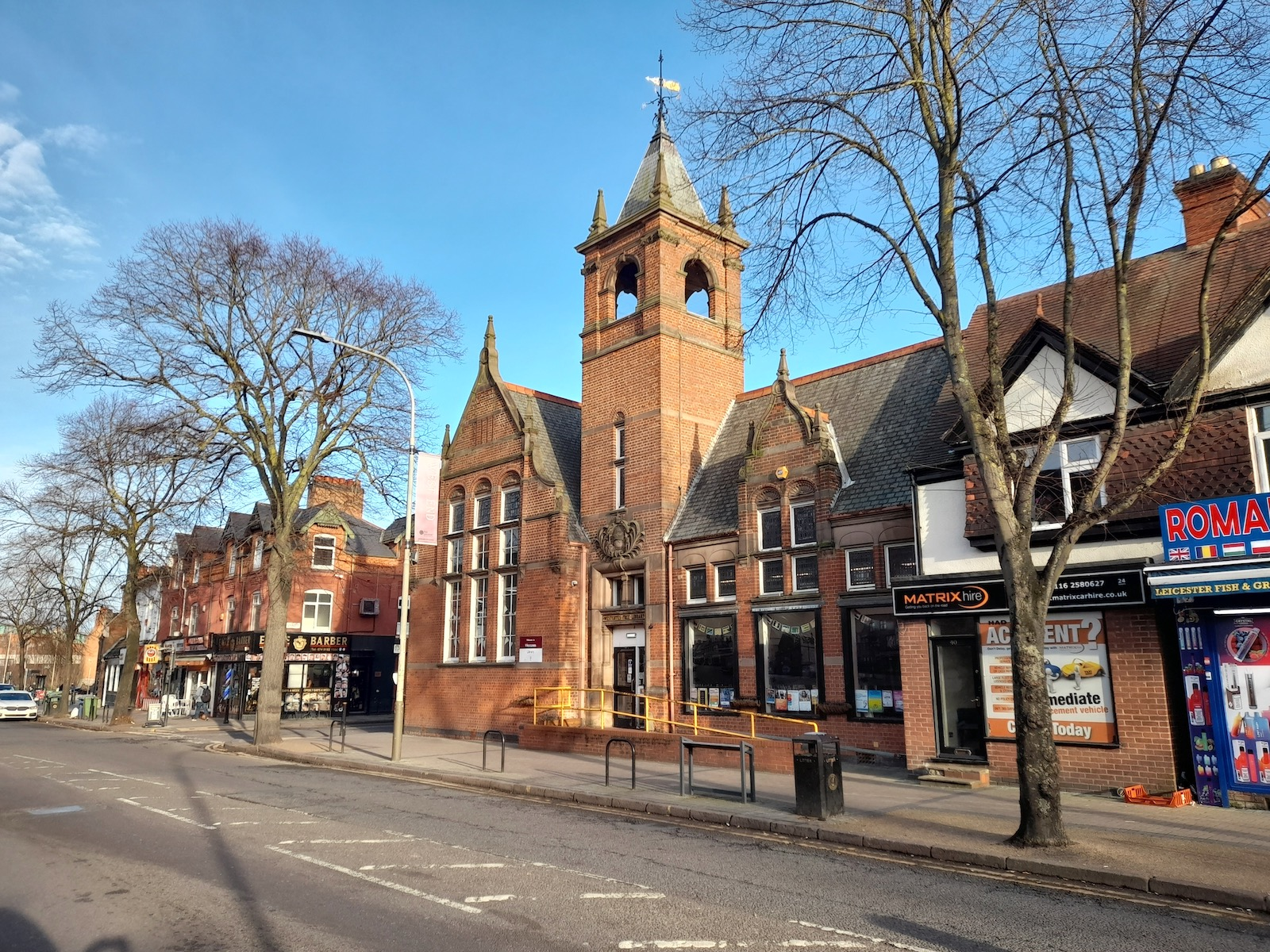
Westcotes Library was opened on 25 March 1889.

Westcotes Library is a library of Leicester City Council, and was built to celebrate the Golden Jubilee of Queen Victoria in 1887. It was funded in part by public subscriptions, and was designed by the Leicester architect Stockdale Harrison. The building opened during the afternoon of 25 March 1889 as the Westcotes Free Library—a branch of the Leicester Free Libraries—and originally held approximately 6,000 books. As of 2024, the library continues to operate and serve the local community.

Narborough Road also includes two Grade II listed buildings. The first to be listed was the former Narborough Road School in March 1999. The school opened in 1900, and was also known as Westcotes Secondary Modern School. The second building to be listed was the Robert Hall Memorial Baptist Church in September 2006.

== Diversity ==
In 2015, a research project titled "Super Diverse Streets", funded by the Economic and Social Research Council (ESRC), was undertaken by the LSE. Led by urban ethnographer Suzanne Hall, the project sought to "explore how urban retail economies and spaces are shaped by and shape migrant practices". Four streets were selected to be studied by the project: Rookery Road in Birmingham, Stapleton Road in Bristol, Cheetham Hill in Manchester, and Narborough Road. These four streets were selected for their ethnic diversity and their deprived urban locale. After surveying a sample of shopkeepers from each of the four streets, the project concluded that Narborough Road's 108 surveyed proprietors came from a total of 22 countries of birth, over four continents. The street was thus named the most diverse in the UK.

The sampled shopkeepers observed that the ethnic make-up of the street had changed quickly. Tajinder Reehal, a Kenyan-born owner of an accessories shop, remarked: "I've seen the street change in the past 16 years. ... It's much more vibrant." Hairdresser Dipak Maru, also Kenyan-born, agreed, and felt that "in the last ten years [the road has] become lively and vibrant". The researchers observed that, despite its high levels of economic deprivation, the high levels of diversity in the street had enabled business owners to trade skills with one another – for example, a Canadian couple who ran a book shop helped others with filling in forms in exchange for a free meal or a free haircut. Speaking about the street's community, Lloyd Wright—the half-English, half-Polish owner of the music shop IntaSound—noted: "There's no tension. It's a very relaxed atmosphere."

As a result of the conclusions of the project, in July 2016 the TV channel Channel 4 invited some of the shopkeepers of Narborough Road to provide voiceovers for announcements for their programmes. A total of 21 residents and shopkeepers were invited to provide announcements, which took four days to record. These announcements were broadcast on Channel 4 during the week beginning 23 July.
