= Westcotes =

Area in the west of the city of Leicester, England

Coordinates: 52.630°N 1.156°W

Westcotes, also known as West End, is an inner city area of Leicester, England, UK and an electoral ward of Leicester City Council. It is located just west of the city centre over the River Soar and south of West Bridge and the old town West Gates. Its neighbouring districts are Braunstone to the south, and Dane Hills to the west. The main roads in the area are Braunstone Gate, Hinckley Road and Narborough Road. The proximity to De Montfort University makes it a popular student area. The area is quite small in comparison with other areas of the city, but it is well known for its many shops, bars and restaurants and is a popular choice for students and young professionals.

The area was developed quite late, because the land remained part of two privately held estates until the 1870s. and therefore is somewhat less dense than other inner city areas like Highfields and Belgrave. At the 2011 census the population of the ward was 11,644.

== History ==
=== Roman ===
Two Roman roads crossed the West End. Both of these roads crossed the River Soar at a place close to where the West Bridge stands today. One of these roads headed in a south-westerly direction, which was the Fosse Way. The Fosse Way ran from the vicinity of Exeter to Lincolnshire, passing through Leicester. A second road ran directly westwards to join Watling Street, another important Roman Road, at Mancetter in Warwickshire.

In the 1970s the remains of a Roman villa were discovered close to the course of the Mancetter road on Saxon Street. The dwelling included many features that were characteristic of life throughout the Roman Empire; including under-floor heating and painted wall-plaster. The remains of the decorations can still be seen at the Jewry Wall Museum.

=== Medieval and early modern periods ===
According to the Domesday book of 1086, the West End formed part of what was known as Bromkinsthorpe. The land was then divided into two areas under the inclosure acts during the reign of Charles I in 1626. In the early 1780s, some Roman mosaics were found amongst the cherry tree roots at Danet's Hall (which belonged to the Danet family from the 15th to the late 17th centuries), located "between Bow Bridge and Fosse Road on a wooded lane known as Watt’s Causeway, later to become King Richards Road". In 1850, the owner (Dr Noble), on finding the possibility that there may be Roman remains on his property, donated any finds to the Town Hall and a dig was commenced. Finds can now be seen at the Jewry Wall Museum.

=== The Victorian era ===
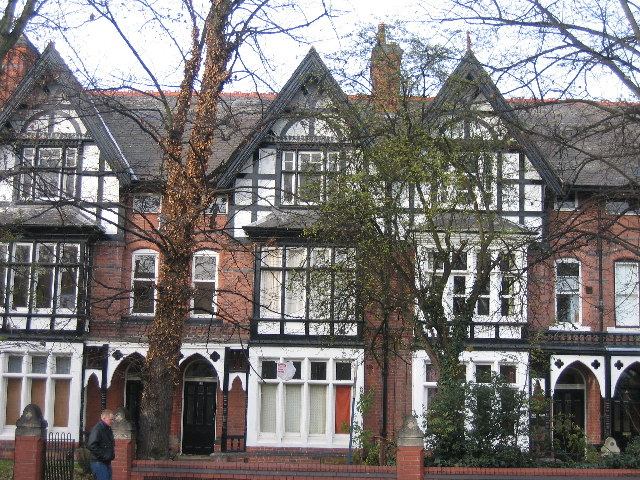
Victorian housing in Narborough Road

In 1861, Dr Noble died of cholera in Spain. The Danet's Hall estate passed to the Leicester Freehold Land Society, and building soon followed. As the Leicester Improvement Act 1881 (44 & 45 Vict. c. lxxiii) was passed in Parliament, a long straight cut was made from the Burton Railway Bridge north to the King Richards Road. This allowed the canalisation of the River Soar into the "Mile Straight" and allowed the draining of the marshy land to the west of the river. This permitted the development of land to the west of the river. More new streets were laid out towards the end of the 19th century, and much of the area to the east was built up by 1900. In the next 40 years the area was to become completely built up. The street pattern laid down in these times remains to this day.

Much of the area belonged to the Westcotes Estate (from where the area derives its name), formerly in the possession of the Ruding family since 1558, was sold, in 1821, to Thomas Freer, Clerk of the Peace, with office in New Street. His son sold it in 1843 to Joseph Harris, the last owner. The mansion, known as Westcotes, was sited in the area now occupied by Cranmer Street, and it was the home of Joseph Harris until 1886 when much of the estate was sold and the house demolished.

During the latter half of the 19th century industry in Leicester grew at a great pace, principally in its already well established knitting, hosiery and boot and shoe industries. The increase in the workforce created a need for more housing. Much of the house construction in the West End area was undertaken by small enterprise, leading to considerable diversity in building design and form, even over relatively narrow geographical scales. The area to this day still mainly consists of Victorian housing stock.

=== Twentieth century ===
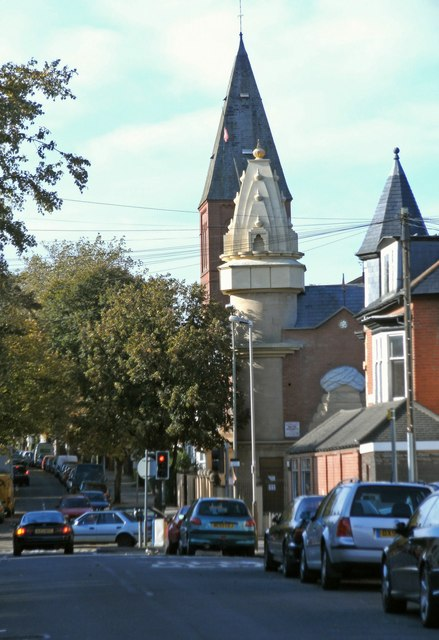
The Hindu temple and the Church of the Martyrs

The West End area, together with the Walnut Street district on the other side of the River Soar, was an important residential area in the early twentieth century. With textile, clothing and shoe-making employers such as Liberty Shoes and N. Corah and Sons nearby, and with the manufacturing centres of Woodgate and Frog Island in adjacent districts, the West End was home to many of the employees of Leicester's dominant industries. As a consequence, these areas had a vibrant community based around factory life, and around other social institution such as sports clubs and churches.

Following the end of World War II, there were changes in the make up of the population in the West End. The 1951 Census recorded 1,029 people born in the USSR, mainly Ukrainians, in the city. The older terraced houses in the West End provided rented accommodation.

Due to the nature of the migration, the Ukrainian men were separated from the women and twice as many males than women arrived in Leicester. As a consequence many single men married local girls and a close-knit community was formed. Orthodox Ukrainians held services at the Church of the Martyrs on Westcotes Drive. This helped maintain Ukrainian culture in the area. This group amassed enough capital and later bought its own church on the corner of Hinckley road and Fosse Road South which they bought from the Methodists.

The condition of housing much of central Leicester was, by post-war standards, very poor. From 1970 to 1971 a Compulsory Purchase Order (CPO) was made under the Housing Act 1957 to allow "outworn terraces" to be cleared. This allowed road works for an improved western approach to the city along the A47 and King Richards Road. 1,084 houses were cleared in total under the CPO.

==== Westcotes Gardens ====
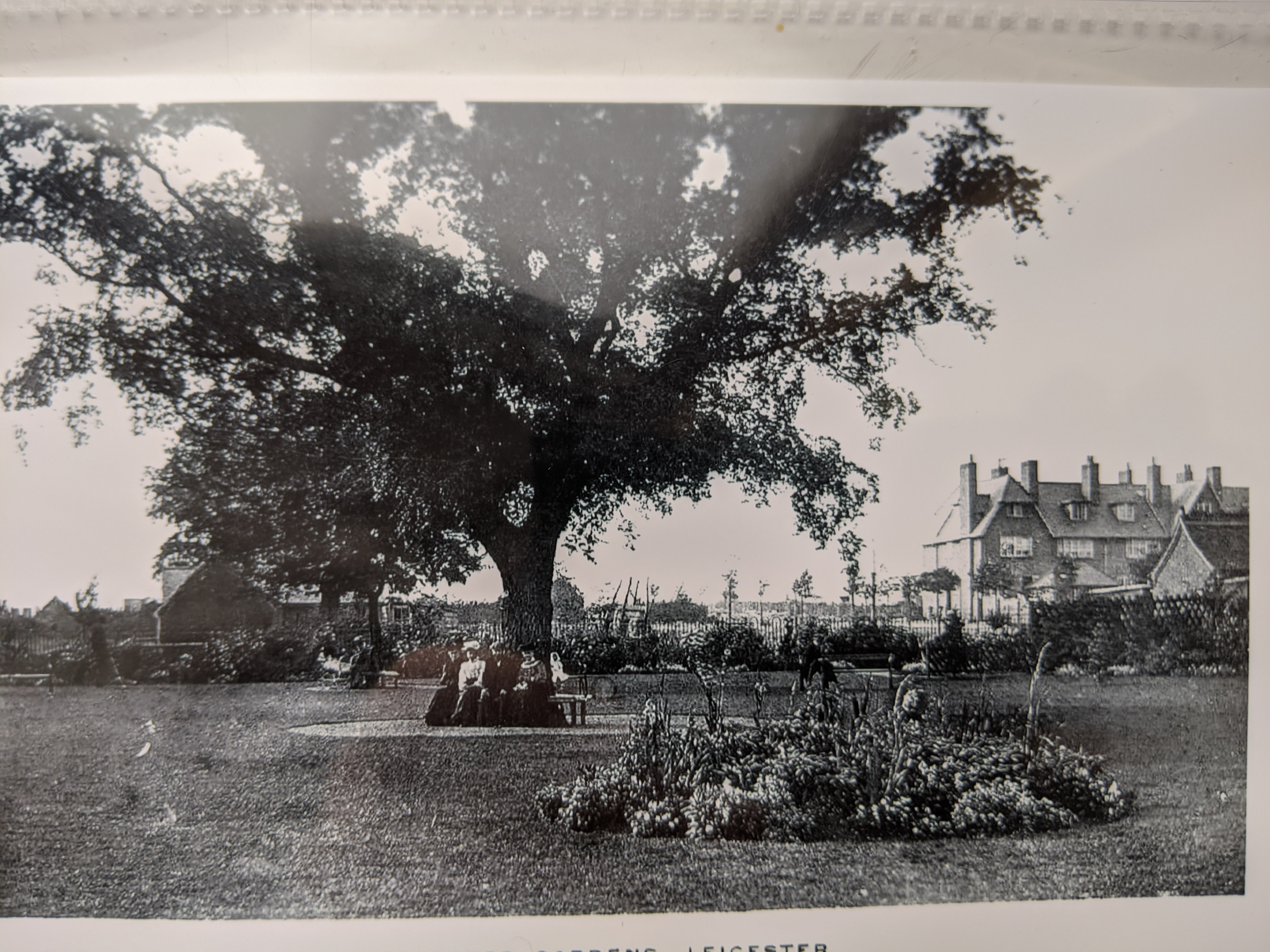
Westcotes Gardens, Leicester, c. 1910

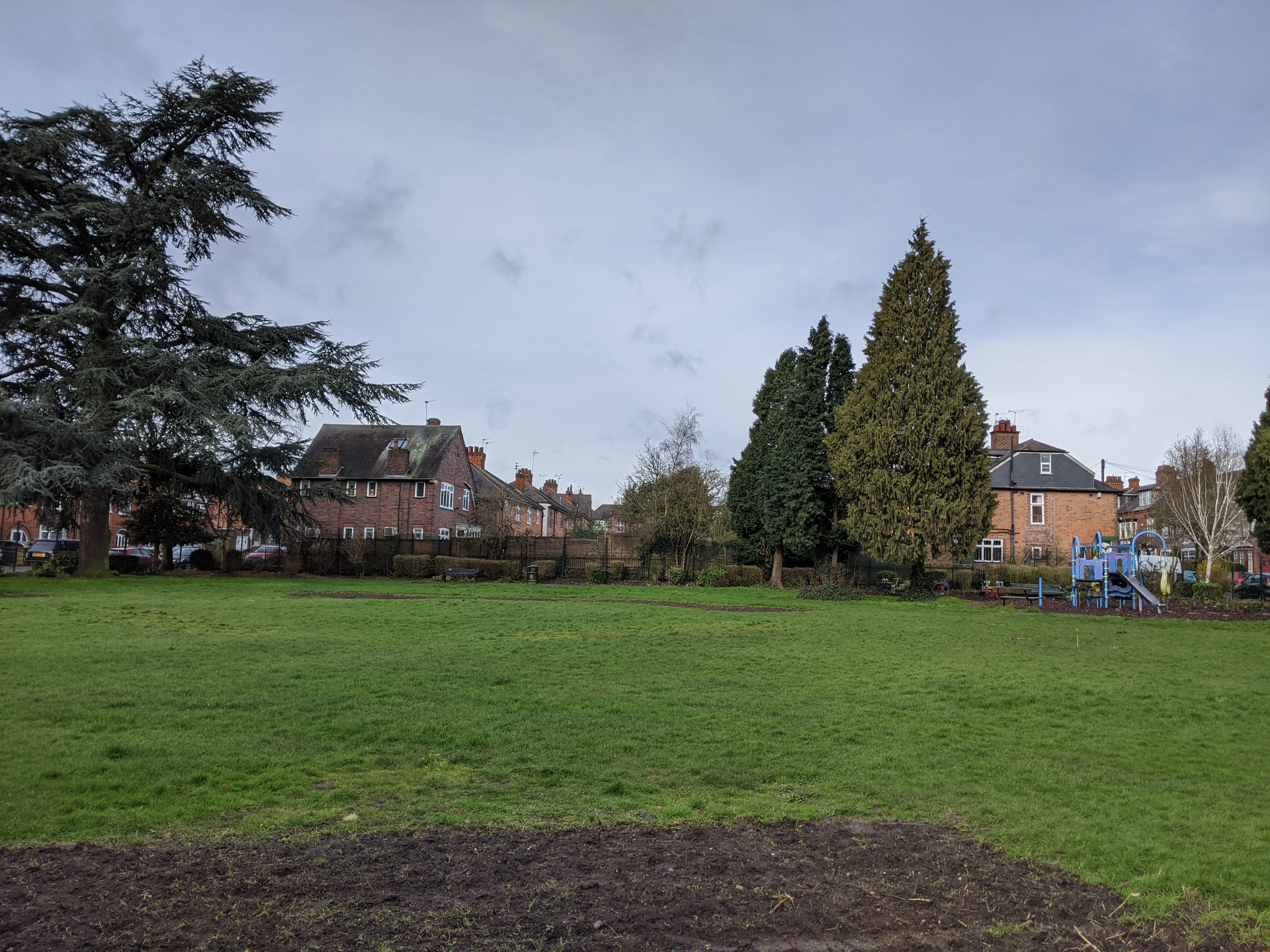
Westcotes Gardens, 2020

According to Leicester City Council's Local Heritage Asset Register, the land for Westcotes Gardens was gifted to the city by Westcotes Estates Ltd. as part of their development of surrounding residential streets. The Register indicates that the Gardens were laid out and opened circa 1905.

The attached historic picture of Westcotes Gardens shows in the background the terrace of houses forming nos. 36-46 (evens), 132 Beaconsfield Rd (originally Bismark Street) and 171 Upperton Road. According to the Asset Register, this terrace was designed by local firm Pick Everard circa 1906. The picture shows what appears to be a detached stable block to the rear of 171 Upperton Road which no longer exists. It seems likely that the block was demolished to make way for 167-169 Upperton Road. The picture also appears to show a detached (possibly agricultural?) building to the north of Westcotes Gardens, now occupied by the 1920s houses and their gardens of Upperton Road and Ashleigh Road.

For comparison, also attached is a picture taken from an equivalent position in Westcotes Gardens in March 2020.

Diversity

The area is known for its diverse communities and shops serving cultural food from around the world mainly in Narborough Road, one of the busiest and diverse streets in Leicester. The largest ethnicities are of Turkish and Eastern European descent including Istanbul restaurant, the area has a large variety of Mosques and Churches.
