= Winstanley House =

Country house in Leicester, UK

Coordinates: 52°37′30″N 1°10′38″W

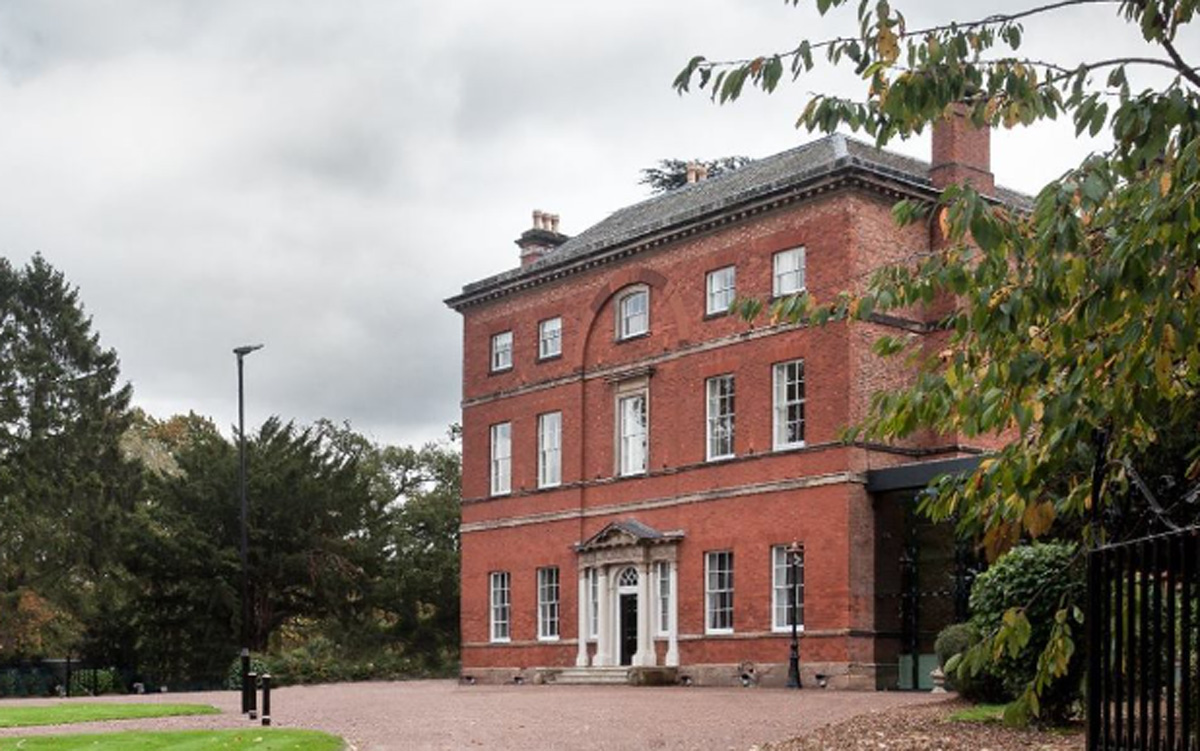
Winstanley House, Leicester

Winstanley House in Leicestershire previously called Braunstone Hall, is a building of historical significance and is Grade II listed on the English Heritage Register. It was built in 1775 by Clement Winstanley and remained in this family for the next 150 years. It was then bought in 1925 by the Leicester City Council. Today it has been converted into a hotel and restaurant.

== The Winstanley family ==
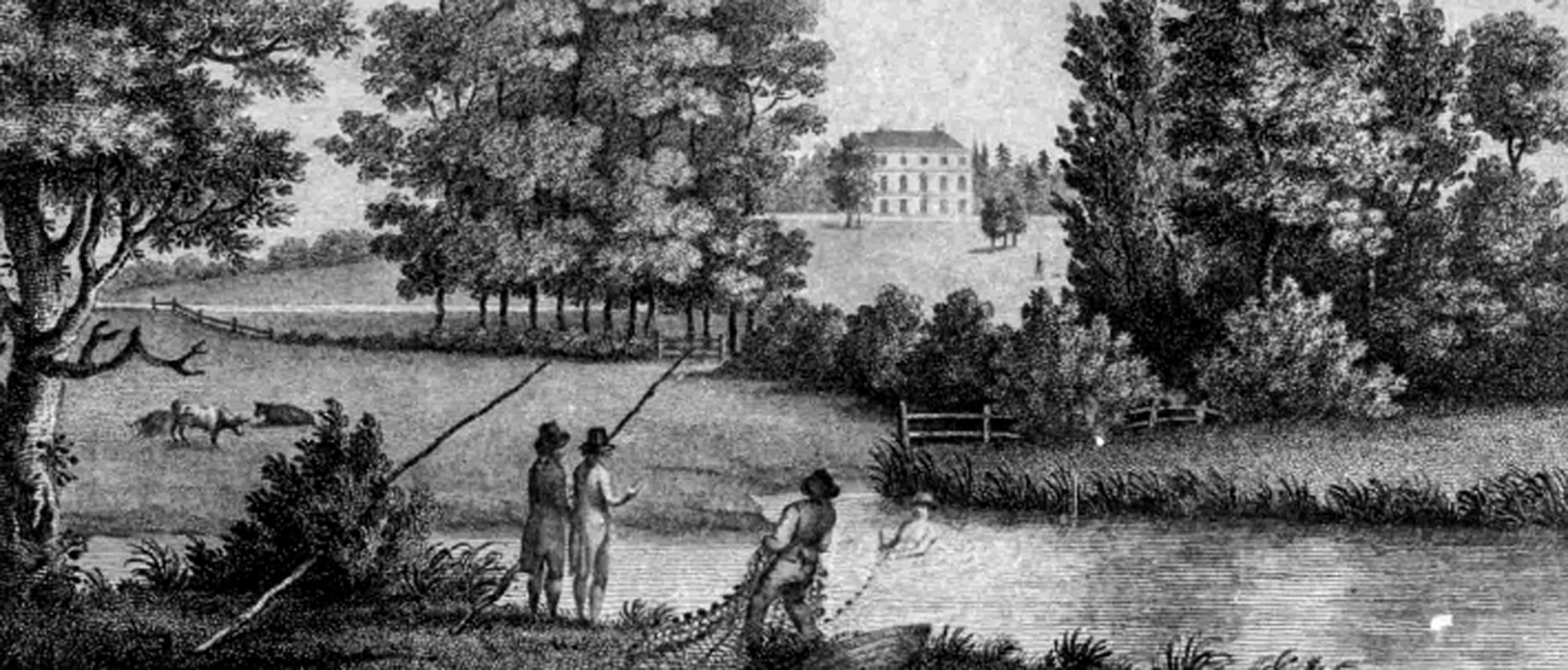
Engraving of Winstanley House (then called Braunstone Hall) in 1810

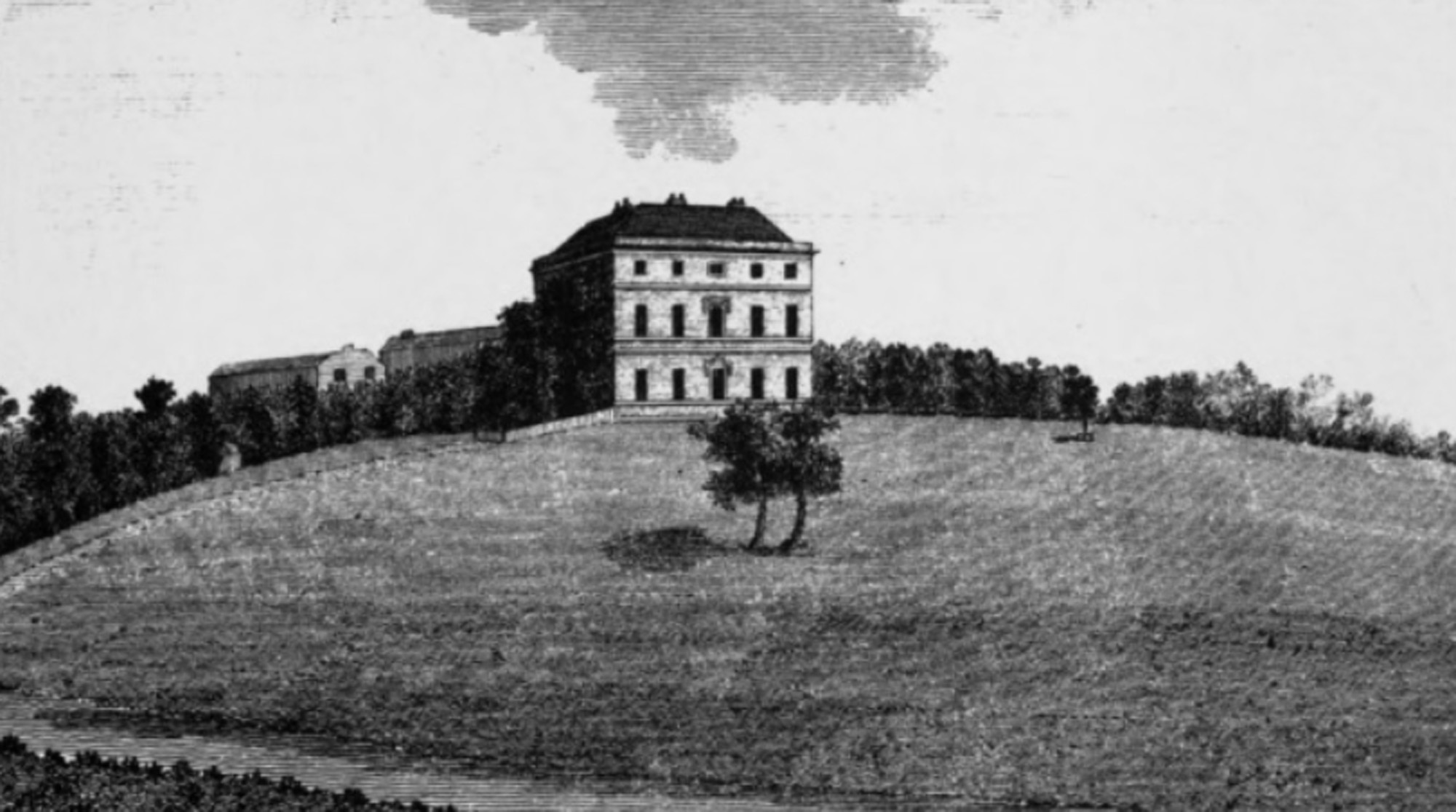
Engraving of Winstanley House (then called Braunstone Hall) in 1810

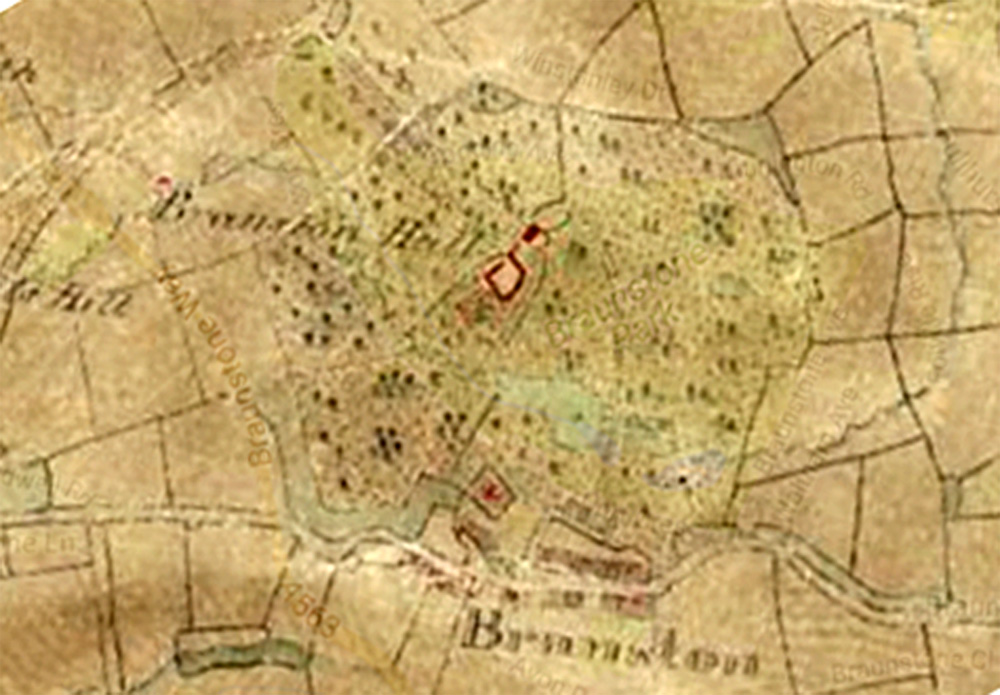
Map of Braunstone Park 1815

Clement Winstanley (1739–1808) built Braunstone Hall in 1775. He was the son of James Winstanley (1706–1770) whose family had owned the Braunstone Estate since 1650. His mother was Mary Prideaux (1712–1758) the daughter and co-heir of Sir Edmund Prideaux. James Winstanley died in 1770 leaving his property to Clement. At this time Nichols says there was an old mansion on the Braunstone Estate adjoining the village of Braunstone which was partially demolished but some parts remained when the new house was built.

In 1769 shortly before his father's death Clement inherited from his maternal relation Humphrey Chetham the whole of the Castleton Estate in Lancashire. In 1773 he sold this property for a very large sum enabling him to build Braunstone Hall. In addition in 1778 he bought Kirby Muxloe Castle and this estate remained in the family until 1911.

In 1774 he served as Sheriff of Leicester; in the same year he married Jane Parkyns (1752–1807), daughter of Sir Thomas Parkyns, 3rd Baronet. and they had six children. The eldest son (also called Clement) inherited the Braunstone Estate in 1808 when his father died.

Clement Winstanley (1775–1855) was born in 1775 shortly after the new Hall was built. He did not marry and lived all of his life at Braunstone Hall. He also had a seaside residence called Brookfield near Teignmouth. He was educated at Uppingham School and Pembroke College, Cambridge. In 1794 he entered the army and several years later became a Major. In 1802 he joined the Leicestershire Militia as Lieutenant Colonel. When he obtained his inheritance in 1808 he resigned to run his estate. He was careful to ensure that the remains of Kirby Muxloe Castle were preserved and was acknowledged for his efforts.

In about 1810 Nichols made an engraving of the house for his book. He gave the following description of the estate at that time.

"In the principal front the grounds are ornamented with trees and at the back of the house is a fine sheet of water gliding into a lower reservoir adorned with delightful foliage."

"The gardens a judiciously planned, the hothouses large and commodious and the walls well clothed with fruit trees. The inside of the house is neat and elegant."

Clement died in 1855 and as he was unmarried and had no children the property went to his nephew James Beaumont Winstanley.

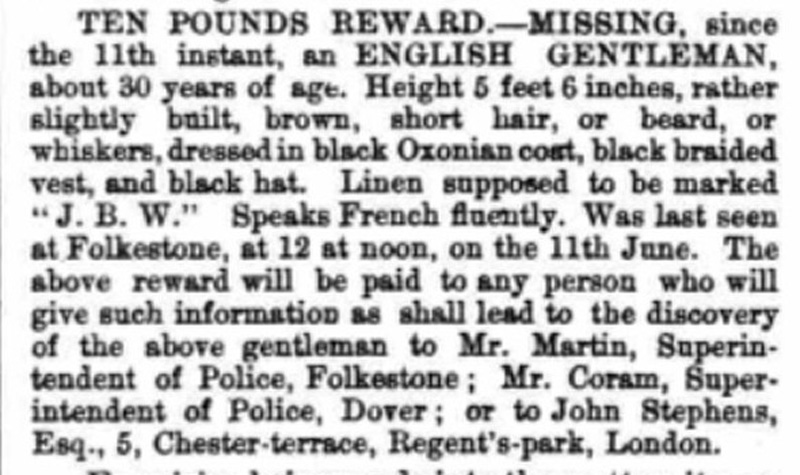
Advertisement offering a reward for information on the whereabouts of James Beaumont Winstanley

James Beaumont Winstanley (1829–1862) was 24 when he inherited Braunstone Hall. He had owned it for only seven years when he mysteriously disappeared. According to the newspapers of the time he was supposed to have met his mother Mary Frances Winstanley and his unmarried sister Frances Birch Winstanley who were returning home from Paris. Both of these women were living at Braunstone Hall at this time as they were recorded as residents in the 1861 Census. They were to have met him at the Folkestone Quay but he did not arrive so after a fruitless search they informed the police. An advertisement (which is shown) was put in The Times offering a reward for information about his whereabouts. Inspector Francis Smith of the Leicester City Police (known as Tanky Smith) was sent by the authorities to look for the missing man and in July he sent a telegram saying that he had found a body at Koblenz in Germany. Three more people travelled over to Germany to identify the remains. They were the Under Sheriff William Gregory, the Reverend Thomas Carlyon who was a relative and the butler of Braunstone Hall William French (who is shown in the 1861 Census).

Apparently the dead man had been crossing the Moselle River in a ferry when he fell and was drowned. He was found five days later and was buried. He was later exhumed on the authority of Inspector Smith when he heard of the incident and was identified as being James by the group mentioned above. Their main reason for a positive identification was the shirt studs. They did not find the initials J.B.W. (mentioned in the advertisement above) on the clothing but a laundry tab had been cut from the shirt.

Smith received a great deal of praise for finding James Winstanley but surprisingly nineteen years later he cast doubt on his own achievement. In a court case in 1881 about land owned by the family there was a claim that James Winstanley could still be alive. Smith was called as a witness as he was the only one of the group present in 1862 who was still living. It was reported in The Times that "although he had been satisfied at the time of the identity, (he) now threw some doubt upon the question by saying that the body was in such a state of decomposition as to render it difficult to recognise". In spite of his evidence it was found by the judge that James was definitely no longer alive.

James was unmarried and had no children so his sister Anna Jane Pochin inherited Braunstone Hall.

== The Pochin family ==
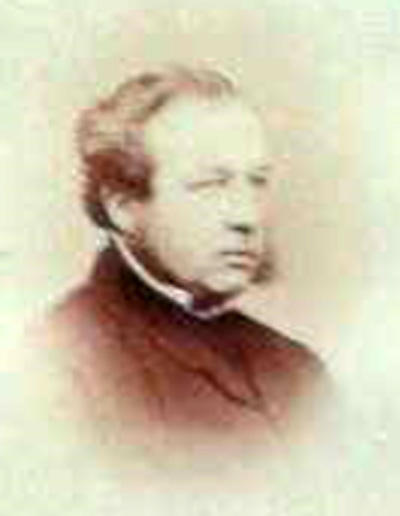
Ralph George Pochin

Anna Jane Pochin (née Winstanley) (1825-1910) was born in 1825. She was the daughter of the Reverend George Winstanley, Vicar of Glenfield and Mary Frances Birch. In 1855 she married Ralph George Pochin (1829-1897) who was the youngest son of George Pochin of Barkby Hall.

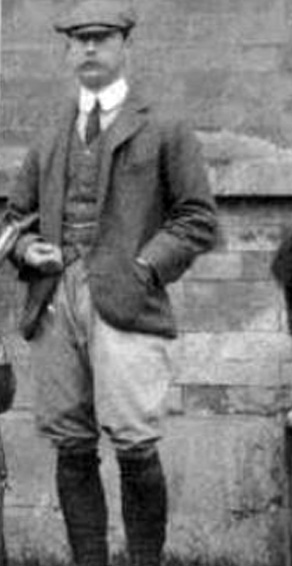
Richard Norman Pochin (later Winstanley) in 1902

Ralph Pochin was born in 1829. He joined the Navy in 1848 and quickly rose through the ranks to become Captain. He retired in 1866 several years after his wife Anna inherited Braunstone Hall so that he could run the estate. The 1871 Census shows them both living there with their eight children. They had five sons and three daughters. Their lives over the next thirty years appear to fairly peaceful. When he died in 1897 his obituary stated that "Captain Pochin lived the quiet life of the country gentleman upon his beautiful estate at Braunstone of which he was intensely fond."

Soon after his death tragedy struck the family when Clement their fifth son died in the Boer War in 1900. Then in 1903 Ralph their eldest son died and in the following year James their second eldest son also died. He was in command of the Coastguard Division at Shetland when he was drowned in Lake Girlsta while on a shooting trip. These deaths may have influenced Anna Jane who was now managing the Braunstone estate to hand ownership in 1904 to her son Richard Norman Pochin.

Richard Norman Pochin (1864-1954) changed his name to Winstanley when he became the owner of the property. Richard had been through the Royal Military College, Sandhurst and had graduated in 1885 to become Lieutenant in the East Surrey Regiment. In 1904 when he was asked to become owner of the house he was a captain of this regiment and unmarried. It is doubtful if he expected to become a landed proprietor as he was the third son. He retired from the military and took over from his mother. In 1907 at the age of 43 he married Kathleen Rachel Dubois-Phillips (1887-1962) who was 23 years his junior. She was the daughter of Captain Dubois-Phillips of Moor House, Great Crosby. The couple had six children – two sons and four daughters. In 1911 Richard extended the south side of the Hall by adding a wing with toilets and bathrooms. The initials R & K can be seen in decorative brickwork. In the same year he placed Kirby Muxloe Castle under the guardianship of the Ministry of Works, and it is now managed by English Heritage.

In 1925 the Leicester Corporation compulsorily purchased his land in Braunstone for housing. The family moved to Rownhams House near Southampton where Richard lived for the rest of his life.
