= Braunstone Park =

Public park in Leicester, England

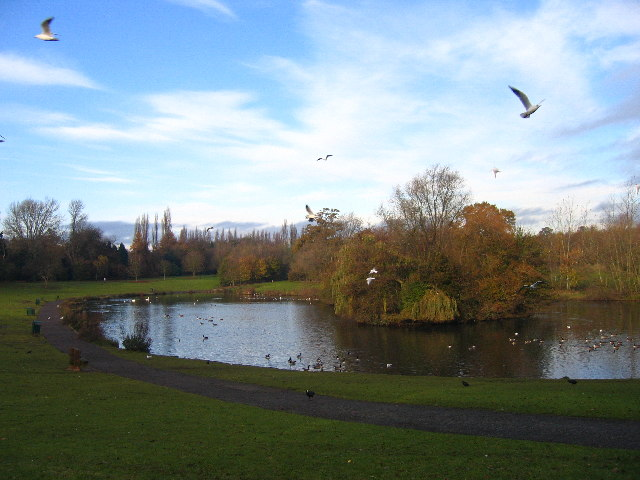
- A lake at Braunstone Park
- Interactive map of Braunstone Park
- Location: Braunstone, Leicester, United Kingdom
- Area: 168 acres (68 ha)
- Operator: Leicester City Council

Braunstone Park is a large public park located in Braunstone, Leicester, England.

== History ==
Braunstone Hall, which was built as a private house in 1775, became a school in 1932.

== Facilities ==
The park covers an area of 168 acres, has two lakes, large open spaces, woodlands and meadows. It has three formal gardens; a war memorial garden, a walled garden and an azalea garden. Facilities include a children's play area, a skate park, outdoor gyms and four football pitches. A small museum in the park opens on special occasions. At the edge of the park is Braunstone Leisure Centre, which is run by Leicester City Council.

=== Parkrun ===
Every Saturday morning at 9am, Braunstone Park hosts a parkrun run marshalled by volunteers. The first Braunstone parkrun was held on 25 September 2010.
