= Walthamstow by-election =

Walthamstow by-election may refer to:

- 1897 Walthamstow by-election
- 1910 Walthamstow by-election
- 1969 Walthamstow East by-election
- 1956 Walthamstow West by-election
- 1967 Walthamstow West by-election
