= Summerson =

Summerson is a surname. Notable people with the surname include:

- Hugo Summerson (born 1950), British politician
- John Summerson (1904–1992), English architectural historian

== See also ==
- Mount Summerson, mountain surmounting the northern end of Endurance Cliffs in the Geologists Range of Antarctica
