= Walthamstow (constituency) =

UK Parliament constituency (since 1974)

- Borough constituency for the House of Commons
- Interactive map of boundaries from 2024
- Location within Greater London
- County: Greater London
- Electorate: 70,867 (March 2020)

Current constituency
- Created: 1974
- Member of Parliament: Stella Creasy (Labour Co-op)
- Seats: One
- Created from: Walthamstow East; Walthamstow West

1885–1918
- Seats: One
- Type of constituency: County constituency
- Created from: South Essex
- Replaced by: Walthamstow East and Walthamstow West, Leyton East, Leyton West, and Epping

Walthamstow (/ˈwɔːlθəmstoʊ/, Estuary English: [ˈwoːwfm̩stɐʏ]) is a constituency (Note: A borough constituency (for the purposes of election expenses and type of returning officer).) in Greater London created in 1974 and represented in the House of Commons of the UK Parliament since 2010 by Stella Creasy, a member of Labour Co-op. (Note: As with all constituencies, the constituency elects one Member of Parliament (MP) by the first past the post system of election at least every five years.)

An earlier version of the constituency existed covering a significantly different area (1885–1918) and was among the vast majority by that time returning one member to the House of Commons.

== Constituency profile ==
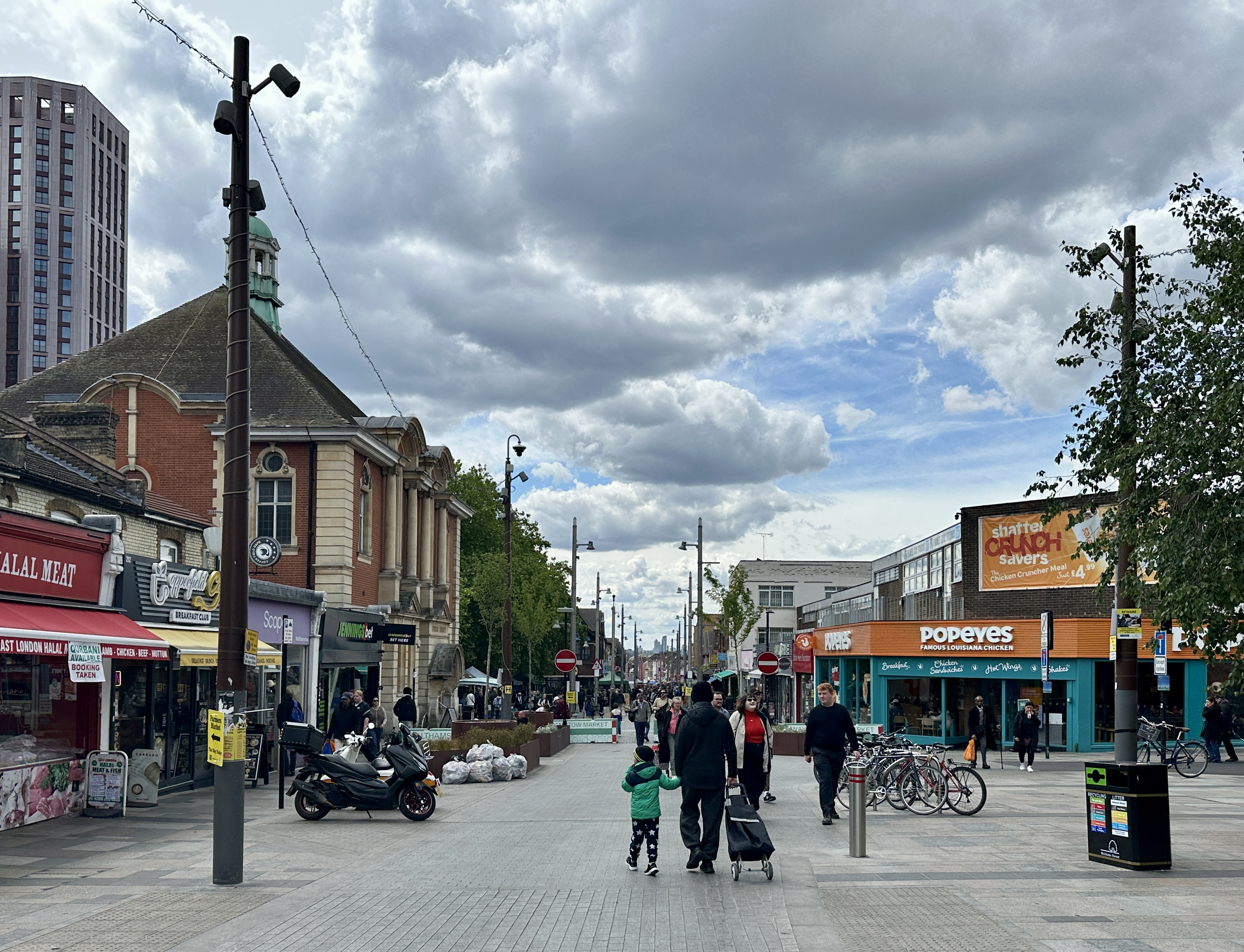
High Street, Walthamstow

Walthamstow is a constituency in Greater London in England, within the Borough of Waltham Forest. It covers the town of Walthamstow and part of Leyton.

This is a mostly suburban constituency located around 7 miles (11 km) north-east of central London. Walthamstow was a rural village until the late 19th century when it was absorbed by London's suburban expansion; the historic village centre is still preserved and is known as Walthamstow Village. The town's good rail connections and its proximity to Stratford City, an area redeveloped for the 2012 Summer Olympics, has led Walthamstow to become increasingly gentrified. Most residents live in dense flats or terraces and there is a mixture of deprived neighbourhoods and wealthier suburbs. House prices here are generally lower than the rest of London but higher than the UK average.

Walthamstow has high proportions of young and middle-aged adults and very few retirees. Like much of London, residents have high rates of income but low levels of homeownership. The child poverty rate is in line with the overall UK figure. Residents are well-educated and a high proportion work in the retail, education and arts sectors. The percentage of residents claiming unemployment benefits is high.

Walthamstow is an ethnically-diverse constituency. White people made up 50% of the population at the 2021 census, around two-fifths of whom were of non-British origin including large Polish, Romanian and Bulgarian communities. Asians, mostly of Pakistani origin, were the largest ethnic minority group at 22%. Black people were 15%, including a large Afro-Caribbean population. Mixed-race people made up 7% of residents.

At the local borough council, most of this constituency is represented by the Green Party with some Labour Party councillors elected in the centre and east of the town. Voters in Walthamstow strongly supported remaining in the European Union in the 2016 referendum; an estimated 64% voted to remain compared to the UK-wide figure of 48%.

== Boundaries ==
=== 1885–1918 ===
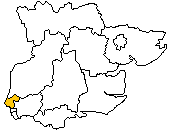
Walthamstow in Essex, 1885–1918

The South-Western or Walthamstow Division of the parliamentary county of Essex was created by the Redistribution of Seats Act 1885, when the existing seat of South Essex was divided into three single-member constituencies.

The constituency consisted of the three civil parishes of Leyton, Woodford and Walthamstow. The area lay on the periphery of the London conurbation and became increasingly suburban over its existence.

The seat was abolished under the Representation of the People Act 1918. Two new constituencies were created with Walthamstow Urban District divided between Walthamstow East and Walthamstow West.

=== From 1974 ===
1974–1983: The London Borough of Waltham Forest wards of Higham Hill, High Street, Hoe Street, St James Street, and Wood Street.

1983–1997: As above plus Lloyd Park.

1997–2010: As above plus Chapel End and Lea Bridge.

2010–2022: The London Borough of Waltham Forest wards of Chapel End, Higham Hill, High Street, Hoe Street, Lea Bridge, Markhouse, William Morris, and Wood Street.

2022–present: Following a local government boundary review which came into effect in May 2022, the constituency now comprises the following wards of the London Borough of Waltham Forest:

- Chapel End; Higham Hill; High Street; Hoe Street (most); Lea Bridge; Markhouse; St James; William Morris; Wood Street; Upper Walthamstow (part); and small parts of Hale End and Highams Park South, Larkswood, and Leyton.

The 2023 review of Westminster constituencies, which was based on the ward structure in place at 1 December 2020, left the boundaries unchanged.

== History ==
The seat has been represented by the Labour Party since 1992, before which it was won on a marginal majority in 1987 by a Conservative, having until then (since its 1974 recreation as a seat) been served by one Labour MP, Eric Deakins.

In 2015, Creasy's re-election saw Walthamstow become Labours' second-safest London seat, and tenth-safest nationally.

=== Prominent frontbenchers ===
Stella Creasy, the present member, was the Shadow Minister for Crime Prevention.

== Members of Parliament ==
=== 1885 to 1918 ===
Election	Member	Party	Notes
1885	Edward Buxton	Liberal	
1886	William Makins	Conservative	Member for South East Essex (1885–1886)
1892	Edmund Widdrington Byrne	Conservative	Resigned after an appointment to the High Court
1897 by-election	Sam Woods	Liberal	Member for Ince (1892–1895)
1900	David John Morgan	Conservative	
1906	John Simon	Liberal	Home Secretary (1915–1916); Contested Walthamstow East following redistribution
1918	constituency abolished		

=== 1974 to present ===
Election	Member	Party	Notes
Feb 1974	Eric Deakins	Labour	Member for Walthamstow West (1970–1974)
1987	Hugo Summerson	Conservative	
1992	Neil Gerrard	Labour	
2010	Stella Creasy	Labour Co-op	

== Election results 1997–present ==
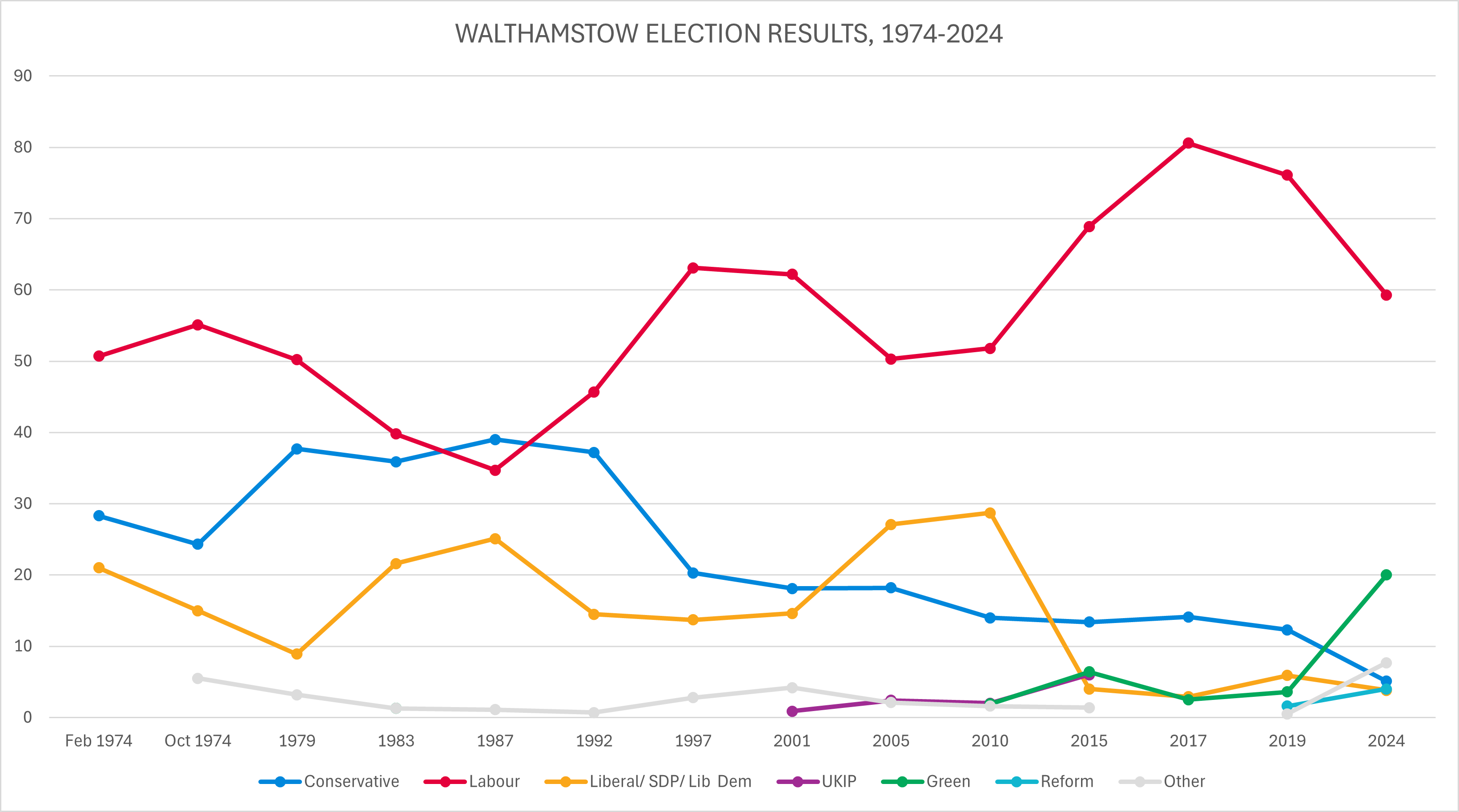
Election results 1974-2024

=== Elections in the 2020s ===
General election 2024: Walthamstow
Party	Candidate	Votes	%	±%
Labour Co-op	Stella Creasy	27,172	59.3	–16.8
Green	Rosalinda Rowlands	9,176	20.0	+16.4
Conservative	Sanjana Karnani	2,353	5.1	–7.2
Reform	Martin Lonergan	1,836	4.0	+2.4
Liberal Democrats	Rebecca Taylor	1,736	3.8	–2.1
Workers Party	Imran Arshad	1,535	3.3	N/A
Independent	Mohammed Ashfaq	914	2.0	N/A
TUSC	Nancy Taaffe	561	1.2	N/A
Independent	Dan Edelstyn	288	0.6	N/A
Independent	Ruth Rawlins	97	0.2	N/A
Majority		17,996	39.3	–24.5
Turnout		45,668	61.3	–8.1
Registered electors		76,338		
Labour Co-op hold		Swing	–16.6	

=== Elections in the 2010s ===
General election 2019: Walthamstow
Party	Candidate	Votes	%	±%
Labour Co-op	Stella Creasy	36,784	76.1	–4.5
Conservative	Shade Adoh	5,922	12.3	–1.8
Liberal Democrats	Meera Chadha	2,874	5.9	+3.0
Green	Andrew Johns	1,733	3.6	+1.1
Brexit Party	Paul Campbell	768	1.6	N/A
CPA	Deborah Longe	254	0.5	N/A
Majority		30,862	63.8	–2.7
Turnout		48,355	68.8	–2.0
Registered electors		70,268		
Labour Co-op hold		Swing	–1.3	

General election 2017: Walthamstow
Party	Candidate	Votes	%	±%
Labour Co-op	Stella Creasy	38,793	80.6	+11.7
Conservative	Molly Samuel	6,776	14.1	+0.7
Liberal Democrats	Ukonu Obasi	1,384	2.9	–1.1
Green	Andrew Johns	1,190	2.5	–3.9
Majority		32,017	66.5	+11.0
Turnout		48,143	70.8	+8.4
Registered electors		67,957		
Labour Co-op hold		Swing	+5.5	

General election 2015: Walthamstow
Party	Candidate	Votes	%	±%
Labour Co-op	Stella Creasy	28,779	68.9	+17.1
Conservative	Molly Samuel	5,584	13.4	–0.6
Green	Michael Gold	2,661	6.4	+4.5
UKIP	Paul Hillman	2,507	6.0	+4.0
Liberal Democrats	Stephen Cheung	1,661	4.0	–24.7
TUSC	Nancy Taaffe	394	0.9	+0.2
Independent	Ellie Merton	129	0.3	N/A
Workers Revolutionary	Jonty Leff	81	0.2	N/A
Majority		23,195	55.5	+32.4
Turnout		41,796	62.4	–1.0
Registered electors		67,015		
Labour Co-op hold		Swing	+8.8	

General election 2010: Walthamstow
Party	Candidate	Votes	%	±%
Labour Co-op	Stella Creasy	21,252	51.8	+1.5
Liberal Democrats	Farid Ahmed	11,774	28.7	+1.6
Conservative	Andy Hemsted	5,734	14.0	–4.2
UKIP	Judith Chisholm-Benli	823	2.0	–0.4
Green	Daniel Perrett	767	1.9	N/A
TUSC	Nancy Taaffe	279	0.7	N/A
Christian	Ashar Mall	248	0.6	N/A
Independent	Paul Warburton	117	0.3	N/A
Majority		9,478	23.1	–0.1
Turnout		40,994	63.4	+8.8
Registered electors		64,625		
Labour Co-op hold		Swing	–0.0	

=== Elections in the 2000s ===
General election 2005: Walthamstow
Party	Candidate	Votes	%	±%
Labour	Neil Gerrard	17,323	50.3	–11.9
Liberal Democrats	Farid Ahmed	9,330	27.1	+12.5
Conservative	Jane Wright	6,254	18.2	+0.1
UKIP	Robert Brock	810	2.4	+1.5
Socialist	Nancy Taaffe	727	2.1	–0.2
Majority		7,993	23.2	–20.9
Turnout		34,444	54.6	+1.1
Registered electors		63,079		
Labour hold		Swing	–12.2	

General election 2001: Walthamstow
Party	Candidate	Votes	%	±%
Labour	Neil Gerrard	21,402	62.2	–0.9
Conservative	Nicholas Smith	6,221	18.1	–2.2
Liberal Democrats	Peter Dunphy	5,024	14.6	+0.9
Socialist	Simon Donovan	806	2.3	N/A
BNP	William Phillips	389	1.1	N/A
UKIP	Gerda Mayer	298	0.9	N/A
ProLife Alliance	Barbara Duffy	289	0.8	N/A
Majority		15,181	44.1	+1.3
Turnout		34,429	53.5	–9.3
Registered electors		64,403		
Labour hold		Swing	+0.6	

=== Elections in the 1990s ===
General election 1997: Walthamstow
Party	Candidate	Votes	%	±%
Labour	Neil Gerrard	25,287	63.1	+18.8
Conservative	Jill Andrew	8,138	20.3	–16.9
Liberal Democrats	Jane Jackson	5,491	13.7	–2.1
Referendum	George Hargreaves	1,139	2.8	N/A
Majority		17,149	42.8	+35.7
Turnout		40,055	62.8	–8.6
Registered electors		63,818		–3.9
Labour hold		Swing	+17.9	

1992 notional result
Party	Vote	%
Labour	21,001	44.3
Conservative	17,650	37.2
Liberal Democrats	7,489	15.8
Others	1,285	2.7
Turnout	47,425	71.4
Electorate	66,412	

== Election results 1983–1997 ==
=== Elections in the 1990s ===
General election 1992: Walthamstow
Party	Candidate	Votes	%	±%
Labour	Neil Gerrard	16,251	45.7	+11.0
Conservative	Hugo Summerson	13,229	37.2	–1.8
Liberal Democrats	Peter Leighton	5,142	14.5	N/A
Liberal	Vernon Wilkinson	241	0.7	N/A
Majority		3,022	8.5	N/A
Turnout		34,863	72.4	0.0
Registered electors		49,140		
Labour gain from Conservative		Swing	+6.4	

=== Elections in the 1980s ===
General election 1987: Walthamstow
Party	Candidate	Votes	%	±%
Conservative	Hugo Summerson	13,748	39.0	+3.1
Labour	Eric Deakins	12,236	34.7	–5.1
SDP	Peter Leighton	8,852	25.1	+3.5
Independent	Zafar Iqnal Malik	396	1.1	N/A
Majority		1,512	4.3	N/A
Turnout		35,232	72.4	+3.6
Registered electors		48,691		
Conservative gain from Labour		Swing	+4.1	

General election 1983: Walthamstow
Party	Candidate	Votes	%	±%
Labour	Eric Deakins	13,241	39.8	–10.4
Conservative	Alan Amos	11,936	35.9	–1.8
SDP	Peter Leighton	7,192	21.6	N/A
National Front	P. Mitchell	444	1.3	–1.9
Ecology	Stephen Lambert	424	1.3	N/A
Majority		1,305	3.9	–8.6
Turnout		33,237	68.8	–2.5
Registered electors		48,324		
Labour hold		Swing	–4.3	

1979 notional result
Party	Vote	%
Labour	17,769	50.3
Conservative	13,317	37.7
Liberal	3,129	8.9
Others	1,121	3.2
Turnout	35,336	
Electorate		

== Election results 1974–1983 ==
=== Elections in the 1970s ===
General election 1979: Walthamstow
Party	Candidate	Votes	%	±%
Labour	Eric Deakins	17,651	50.2	–4.9
Conservative	Stephen Eyres	13,248	37.7	+13.4
Liberal	Mervyn Peter O'Flanagan	3,117	8.9	–6.1
National Front	George Flaxton	1,119	3.2	–2.3
Majority		4,403	12.5	–18.3
Turnout		35,135	71.3	+5.1
Registered electors		49,315		
Labour hold		Swing	–9.2	

General election October 1974: Walthamstow
Party	Candidate	Votes	%	±%
Labour	Eric Deakins	19,088	55.1	+4.4
Conservative	D. Arnold	8,424	24.3	–4.0
Liberal	Mervyn Peter O'Flanagan	5,199	15.0	–6.0
National Front	R. Adde	1,911	5.5	N/A
Majority		10,664	30.8	+8.3
Turnout		34,622	66.2	–8.7
Registered electors		52,280		
Labour hold		Swing	+4.2	

General election February 1974: Walthamstow
Party	Candidate	Votes	%	±%
Labour	Eric Deakins	19,726	50.7	–2.6
Conservative	PS Gill	10,992	28.3	–8.3
Liberal	Mervyn Peter O'Flanagan	8,157	21.0	+10.8
Majority		8,374	22.5	+5.7
Turnout		38,875	74.9	+7.0
Registered electors		51,907		−6.1
Labour hold		Swing	+2.8	

1970 notional result
Party	Vote	%
Labour	20,000	53.3
Conservative	13,700	36.5
Liberal	3,800	10.1
Turnout	37,500	67.9
Electorate	55,252	

== Election results 1885–1918 ==
=== Elections in the 1910s ===
General Election 1914–15: Another General Election was required to take place before the end of 1915. The political parties had been making preparations for an election to take place and by July 1914, the following candidates had been selected;

- Liberal: Emslie Horniman
- Unionist: Stanley Johnson

Bellairs

General election December 1910: Walthamstow
Party	Candidate	Votes	%	±%
Liberal	John Simon	16,998	56.1	+2.8
Liberal Unionist	Carlyon Bellairs	13,275	43.9	–2.8
Majority		3,723	12.2	+5.6
Turnout		30,273	77.4	–7.6
Registered electors		39,117		
Liberal hold		Swing	+1.6	

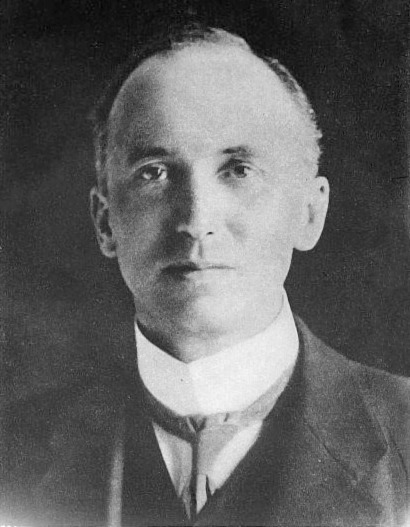
Simon

1910 Walthamstow by-election
Party	Candidate	Votes	%	±%
Liberal	John Simon	16,673	54.5	+1.2
Conservative	Stanley Johnson	13,907	45.5	–1.2
Majority		2,766	9.0	+2.4
Turnout		30,580	78.2	–6.8
Registered electors		39,117		
Liberal hold		Swing	+1.2	

General election January 1910: Walthamstow
Party	Candidate	Votes	%	±%
Liberal	John Simon	17,726	53.3	–4.2
Conservative	Stanley Johnson	15,531	46.7	+4.2
Majority		2,195	6.6	–8.4
Turnout		33,257	85.0	+11.1
Registered electors		39,117		
Liberal hold		Swing	–4.2	

=== Elections in the 1900s ===
General election 1906: Walthamstow
Party	Candidate	Votes	%	±%
Liberal	John Simon	15,011	57.5	+14.7
Conservative	William Isaac Shard	11,074	42.5	–14.7
Majority		3,937	15.0	29.4
Turnout		26,085	73.9	+3.0
Registered electors		35,321		
Liberal gain from Conservative		Swing	+14.7	

Woods

General election 1900: Walthamstow
Party	Candidate	Votes	%	±%
Conservative	David Morgan	9,807	57.2	–3.1
Lib-Lab	Sam Woods	7,342	42.8	+3.1
Majority		2,465	14.4	–6.2
Turnout		17,149	70.9	+6.7
Registered electors		24,187		
Conservative hold		Swing	–3.1	

=== Elections in the 1890s ===
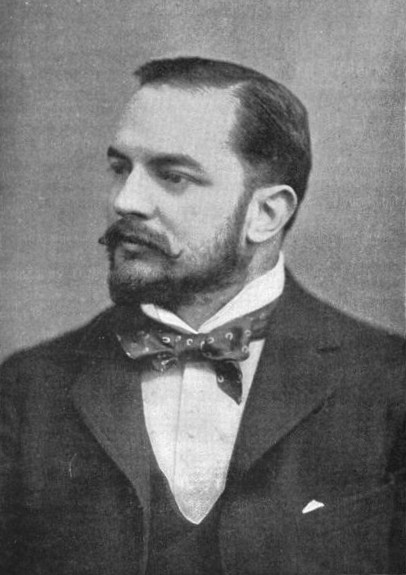
Dewar

1897 Walthamstow by-election
Party	Candidate	Votes	%	±%
Lib-Lab	Sam Woods	6,518	51.1	+11.4
Conservative	Thomas Dewar	6,239	48.9	―11.4
Majority		279	2.2	N/A
Turnout		12,757	64.3	+0.1
Registered electors		19,845		
Lib-Lab gain from Conservative		Swing	+11.4	

General election 1895: Walthamstow
Party	Candidate	Votes	%	±%
Conservative	Edmund Byrne	6,876	60.3	+5.1
Liberal	Arthur Pollen	4,523	39.7	–5.1
Majority		2,353	20.6	+10.2
Turnout		11,399	64.2	–8.1
Registered electors		17,747		
Conservative hold		Swing	+5.1	

General election 1892: Walthamstow
Party	Candidate	Votes	%	±%
Conservative	Edmund Byrne	6,115	55.2	–7.6
Liberal	Walter Basden Whittingham	4,965	44.8	+7.6
Majority		1,150	10.4	–15.2
Turnout		11,080	72.3	+9.1
Registered electors		15,323		
Conservative hold		Swing	–7.6	

=== Elections in the 1880s ===
Spicer

General election 1886: Walthamstow
Party	Candidate	Votes	%	±%
Conservative	William Makins	4,461	62.8	+13.8
Liberal	Albert Spicer	2,639	37.2	–13.8
Majority		1,822	25.6	N/A
Turnout		7,000	63.2	–11.8
Registered electors		11,233		
Conservative hold		Swing	+13.8	

General election 1885: Walthamstow
Party	Candidate	Votes	%
Liberal	Edward Buxton	4,300	51.0
Conservative	Thomas Charles Baring	4,125	49.0
Majority		175	2.0
Turnout		8,425	75.0
Registered electors		11,233	
Liberal win (new seat)			

== See also ==
- Parliamentary constituencies in London

== Notes ==
Parliament of the United Kingdom
Preceded by Essex South	UK Parliament constituency 1885 – 1918	Succeeded by Walthamstow East
Preceded by Essex South	UK Parliament constituency 1885 – 1918	Succeeded by Walthamstow West
Preceded by Essex South	UK Parliament constituency 1885 – 1918	Succeeded by Leyton East
Preceded by Essex South	UK Parliament constituency 1885 – 1918	Succeeded by Leyton West
Preceded by Essex South	UK Parliament constituency 1885 – 1918	Succeeded by Epping
Preceded by Walthamstow East	UK Parliament constituency 1974 – present	Incumbent
Preceded by Walthamstow West	UK Parliament constituency 1974 – present	Incumbent
