= 1897 Walthamstow by-election =

UK parliamentary by-election

- 3 February 1897

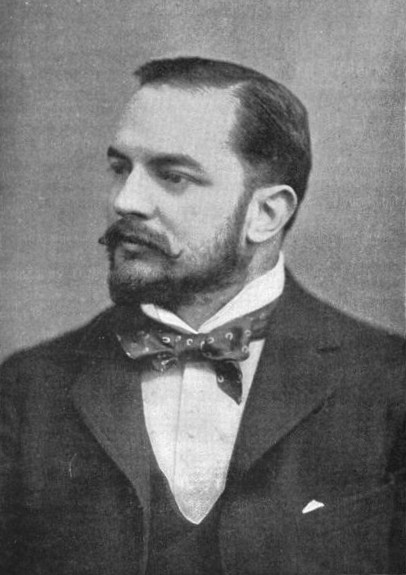
Candidate	Sam Woods	Thomas Dewar
Party	Lib-Lab	Conservative
Popular vote	6,518	6,239
Percentage	51.1%	48.9%
MP before election
Edmund Byrne
Conservative
Subsequent MP
Sam Woods
Lib-Lab

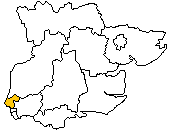
Walthamstow in Essex

The 1897 Walthamstow by-election was a parliamentary by-election held in England on 3 February 1897 for the UK House of Commons constituency of Walthamstow. The area was then a division of Essex, and is now part of Greater London.

The election was won by the Liberal-Labour candidate, after the seat had been held by the Conservative Party for 11 years.

== Vacancy ==
The seat became vacant when Walthamstow's Conservative Member of Parliament (MP) Edmund Byrne QC was appointed as a judge of the Chancery Division of the High Court of Justice. This appointment disqualified him from sitting in parliament, triggering a by-election in Walthamstow.

== Electoral history ==
The first Walthamstow constituency election in 1885 was won by the Liberals. In 1886 the seat was gained by the Conservatives and remained in their hands to 1897. Byrne had held the seat since the 1892 general election. The result at the previous general election was a comfortable victory for the Conservatives;

General election 1895: Walthamstow
Party	Candidate	Votes	%	±%
Conservative	Edmund Byrne	6,876	60.3	+5.1
Liberal	Arthur Pollen	4,423	39.7	−5.1
Majority		2,353	20.6	+10.2
Turnout		11,399	64.2	−8.1
Registered electors		17,747		
Conservative hold		Swing	+5.1	

== Candidates ==
Byrne's appointment was reported in The Times newspaper on 15 January, and on the same day the paper reported that the Scotch whisky magnate Thomas Dewar had "kept himself in touch with the constituency" and might put his name forward as a possible Conservative candidate. The Walthamstow Central Liberal and Radical Association were initially undecided as to whether to contest the election, but were reported to be considering Arthur Pollen, who had been their candidate at the last general election, in 1895.

On Monday 18 January, each of the parties held a meeting to consider their approach to the election. As expected, the Conservatives selected the 33-year-old Dewar, who had built his family business John Dewar & Sons into a global brand. The Liberals had not chosen a candidate, but it was reported to be almost certain that they would contest the election.

With the writ not expected until 22 January, the Liberals were holding nightly consultations on a choice of candidate and Dewar said that he wanted a contested election. Rumours circulated that the Liberals would ask the conservationist Edward Buxton, who had held the seat from 1885 to 1886, to stand again.

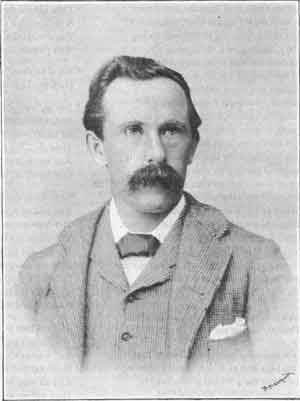
Arnold Hills, who planned to stand as a temperance candidate

Meanwhile, Arnold Hills, chairman of the Thames Ironworks shipbuilding company at Leamouth, announced that he would stand as a Unionist and temperance candidate in opposition to Dewar.

Hills was a sportsman, philanthropist, and promoter of vegetarianism as well as a successful businessman. On 22 January he said that he would definitely stand unless the Liberals fielded a candidate, in which case he would withdraw to avoid splitting the Conservative vote and risk handing the seat to the opposition.

The High Sheriff of Essex announced on the 22nd that nominations would be taken on Thursday 28 January, and that polling would take place on 3 February. The next day, 23 January, the Executive of the Liberal Three Hundred met and selected Sam Woods as their candidate. Woods was a coal miner from St Helens in Lancashire, and a prominent trade unionist who had been President of the Miners' Federation of Great Britain since its foundation in 1891. He had been elected in 1892 as the MP for the Ince division of Lancashire, but lost his seat in 1895. The Times newspaper reported that Woods was the best possible candidate for the Liberals, because he would have the support of the labour as well as all factions of the Liberals.

Hills then stopped his election agent from setting up committee rooms for the campaign, which was taken as a sign that he would indeed stand aside. The selection of Woods was confirmed at a general meeting of the Liberal Three Hundred on 25 January, and Hill's withdrawal was formally announced the following day.

== Campaign ==
Woods said he was an "ardent radical", but not a socialist, and that he supported extending the general principles of Sir William Harcourt's 1894 budget. Woods wanted no direct or indirect tax for anyone earning under £100 per year, and graduated taxes on higher incomes. He also supported the payment of a salary to MPs, who received no payment until 1911. His taxation proposals were scorned by The Times, whose editorial on 26 January said that his proposal "should be worth a good many votes to his opponent".

In a speech at Leyton Town Hall on the 26th, Dewar spoke in favour of trade with the colonies, and excluding alien paupers. He returned to the latter theme on the Friday 29th, when he told a meeting at the Barclay Hall in Leytonstone that "Europe should be told that the East End of London was not the place for the refuse of the continent".

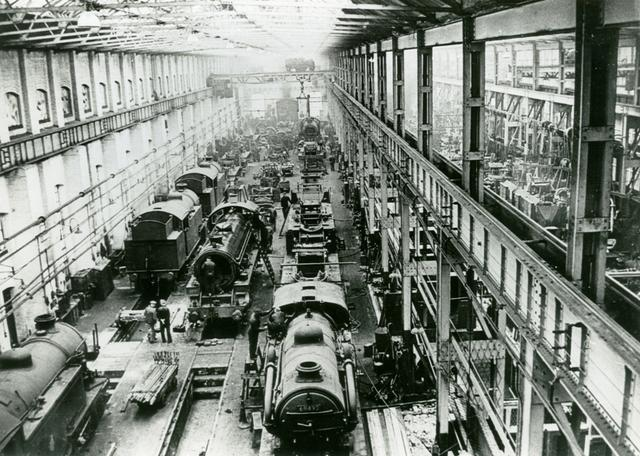
Stratford Railway works

The two parties chose different approaches to electioneering. The Conservatives decided to concentrate on canvassing rather than public meetings, but the Liberals planned 28 meetings. Dewar set out canvassing in his coach and speaking in committee rooms, while the Liberals mounted a higher profile campaign. On Saturday 30th Woods took part in a joint meeting at Stratford Railway Works with Herbert Raphael, the Liberal candidate in the Romford by-election which was being held at the same time. Large numbers of workers from both constituencies were employed at Stratford.

Woods had been chosen as a strong candidate. Several thousand Labour supporters in the constituency were believed never to have voted, a point which the Liberals had used to encourage him to stand. Sensing the opportunity, many prominent trade union and labour leaders came to Walthamstow to support Woods, including Joseph Havelock Wilson of the National Sailors' & Firemen's Union, as well as leaders of the General Labouers, the Carpenters and Joiner, the Gas Workers, Barge Builders and Marine Engineers unions.

Woods opposed what he called the "Government's reactionary legislation", such as the Agricultural Rating Act, its proposals for education, and asking India to contribute to cost of Kitchener's expedition to the Sudan. He supported a range of what were then radical ideas; the abolition of the House of Lords power to veto legislation, one man, one vote in elections, the Irish people to control their own domestic affairs, site value taxation, radical reform of land laws, reform of secondary education, and improved housing. On the temperance issue, which divided Liberals, Woods supported local control over licensing, but objected to tied houses. Fearing constraints on their business, the Essex Licence Holders association decided to support Dewar, and to send a representative into the area to try to organise the licensed trade.

No big controversy developed between the candidates. Irish Home Rule, which had split the Liberals in the 1880s, was only a secondary issue in the election addresses.

== Result ==
Arrangements had been made to count the votes on polling night, rather than wait until the next day. The counting took place in Walthamstow Town Hall, where the results announced shortly after midnight: Woods won, with a majority of 279 votes. His victory came as a surprise, because the Liberals had never expected to win the seat.

Walthamstow by-election, 1897
Party	Candidate	Votes	%	±%
Lib-Lab	Sam Woods	6,518	51.1	+11.4
Conservative	Thomas Dewar	6,239	48.9	−11.4
Majority		279	2.2	N/A
Turnout		12,757	64.3	+0.1
Registered electors		19,845		
Lib-Lab gain from Conservative		Swing	+11.4	

== Aftermath ==
Woods held the seat until the next general election, in October 1900, when he was defeated by the Conservative David Morgan. His health failed in 1904, and he died in 1915.

General election 1900: Walthamstow
Party	Candidate	Votes	%	±%
Conservative	David Morgan	9,807	57.2	−3.1
Lib-Lab	Sam Woods	7,342	42.8	+3.1
Majority		2,465	14.4	−6.2
Turnout		17,149	70.9	+6.7
Registered electors		24,187		
Conservative hold		Swing	-3.1	

Dewar was elected in 1900 as the MP for St George, Tower Hamlets, and knighted in 1902. He stood down at the 1906 election. He expanded his business to form the Distillers Company, was ennobled in 1919 as Baron Dewar, and died in 1930.

== See also ==
- Walthamstow constituency
- Walthamstow
- 1910 Walthamstow by-election
- List of United Kingdom by-elections (1900–1918)
