= Stanley Johnson (politician) =

English solicitor and politician (1869–1937)

Sir Louis Stanley Johnson (11 October 1869 – 30 November 1937) was an English solicitor and Conservative Party politician.

Johnson was the son of Edward Johnson, of Hackney. He was educated privately and admitted as a solicitor in 1899, becoming a partner in the firm of Downer and Johnson, based in 426 Salisbury House, London Wall. (The partnership was dissolved in 1928, when Johnson formed a new partnership known as Stanley Johnson & Allen).

Johnson was a member of Hackney Council. He stood for Parliament, twice in 1910, in the Walthamstow division of Essex. At the January 1910 general election he lost to the Liberal MP Sir John Simon. When Simon faced a by-election in November 1910 after being appointed as Solicitor General, Johnson again failed to unseat him.

Johnson did not contest the general election in December 1910, but in 1914 he became Mayor of Hackney, a position he held until 1919. He finally entered the House of Commons at the 1918 general election when he was elected as the first Member of Parliament (MP) for the newly created Walthamstow East (a division of the Municipal Borough of Walthamstow. Johnson had stood as a Coalition Unionist, and with the assistance of the "coalition coupon", he won nearly twice as many votes as his old adversary, John Simon. He was re-elected in 1922 and in 1923, and stood down from Parliament at the 1924 general election.

He was Honorary Lieutenant-Colonel of the London Regiment, and was knighted in 1920.

Johnson was found dead at his home in Coombe, Kingston upon Thames with a gunshot wound to his head on 30 November 1937; the verdict at his inquest recorded that he "had killed himself while the balance of his mind was disturbed".

Parliament of the United Kingdom
New constituency	Member of Parliament for Walthamstow East; 1918 – 1924	Succeeded by Sir Hamar Greenwood, Bt.
