= Old Town Hall, Walthamstow =

Municipal building in Walthamstow, London, England

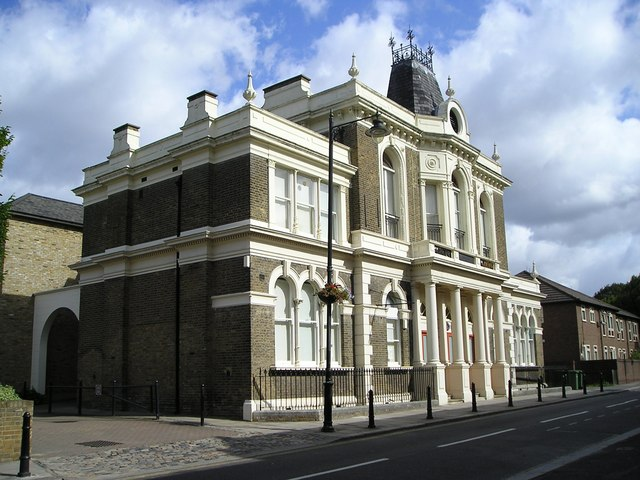
- Old Town Hall, Walthamstow

- Shown in London
- 51.5830°N 0.0117°W
- Location: Orford Road, Walthamstow

History
- Built: 1866

Site notes
- Architectural style: Italianate style

Listed Building – Grade II
- Official name: Old Town Hall
- Designated: 15 November 1988
- Reference no.: 1191150

The Old Town Hall is a former municipal building in Orford Road, Walthamstow, London. The building served in a municipal capacity from 1866 to 1942 and then served as the main entrance block to the Connaught Hospital from 1959 to 1977. It is a Grade II listed building.

== History ==
=== Use as the old town hall ===
The first building on the site was a single storey public hall, which was used for entertainment and probably dated back to the first half of the 19th century. In the mid-19th century, the Walthamstow Local Board decided to demolish the earlier building and commission a new building on the site with the intention that it take over the role of local seat of government from the Vestry House in Vestry Road.

The new building was designed in the Italianate style, built in yellow brick with stucco dressings and was completed in 1866. The design involved a symmetrical main frontage of five bays facing onto Orford Road. The central section of three bays, which was slightly projected forward, featured a portico formed by Doric order columns on pedestals supporting an entablature and a parapet, with a canted window on the first floor. The flanking bays were fenestrated by round headed windows with architraves and keystones on both floors, while the outer bays were fenestrated by tri-partite round headed windows on the ground floor and by tri-partite square headed windows on the first floor.

After the area became an urban district in 1895, the building served as council offices, and after the area became a municipal borough in 1929, it served as the town hall. It remained the main civic building in Walthamstow until 1942 when the council moved to a new building. The civic furnishings were removed from the old town hall at that time. It then remained empty until being converted for hospital use in 1959.

=== Use as a hospital ===
The facility has its origins in a small hospital for sick children established by a Mr and Mrs Tudor in a private house in Brandon Road in 1878. The hospital moved to Salisbury Road as the Leyton, Walthamstow and Wanstead Hospital in 1880. After acquiring additional premises, known as "Holmcroft" in Orford Road, the facility became the Children's and General Hospital for Leyton, Leytonstone, Walthamstow and Wanstead in 1894. It was renamed the Connaught Hospital after its patron, the Duchess of Connaught, in 1928. It acquired additional facilities in Orford Road in 1930 and, after joining the National Health Service in 1948, expanded further acquiring the old town hall in Orford Road as well in 1959.

=== Later uses ===
After patients had been transferred to the North Middlesex Hospital, the hospital closed in 1977 and, while most of the hospital buildings behind the old town hall were subsequently demolished, the old town hall itself was converted into an I-Kuan Tao temple and the former pathology department became the Waltham Forest Asian Centre, later the Waltham Forest Community Hub.
