= Edmund Widdrington Byrne =

British judge and Conservative Party politician

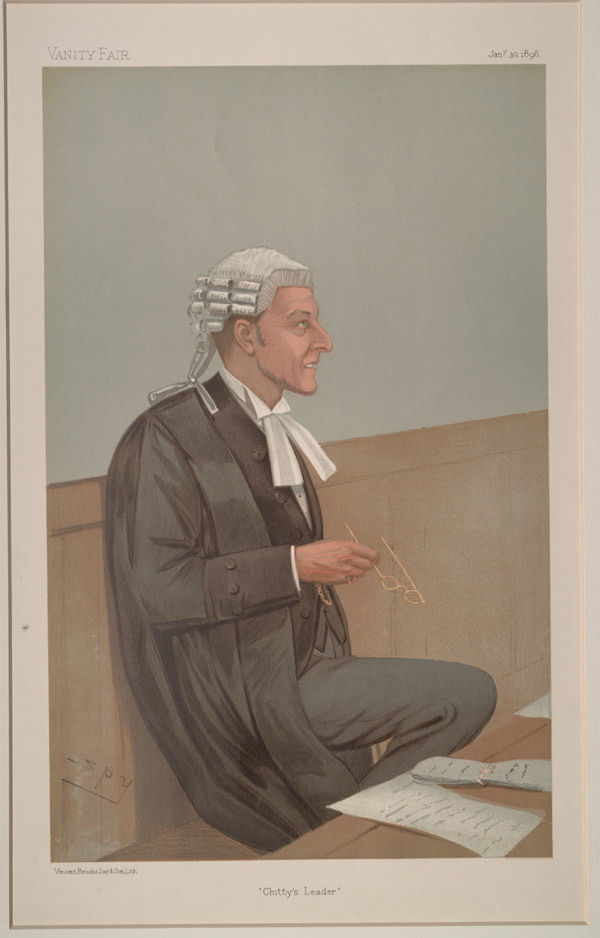
"Chitty's Leader". Caricature by Spy published in Vanity Fair in 1896.

Sir Edmund Widdrington Byrne (30 June 1844 – 4 April 1904) was a British judge and Conservative Party politician.

== Life ==
Byrne was born in Islington, London, and was the son of Edmund Byrne, solicitor, and his wife Mary Elizabeth, née Cowell. He was educated at King's College London and was called to the bar at Lincoln's Inn in 1867.

In 1874, he married Henrietta Gulland of Newton Wemyss, Fife. He established a conveyancing and equity practice, and "took silk" to become a Queen's Counsel in 1888, and attached himself to the court of Mr Justice Chitty.

In 1892 he was selected to contest the South Western or Walthamstow Division of Essex as the candidate of the Conservative Party. He was elected, and retained the seat with an increased majority at the ensuing election in 1895.

In January 1897, Mr Justice Chitty retired, and Byrne was selected to fill the vacancy as a judge of the Chancery Division of the High Court of Justice. This required him to resign his seat in parliament. He was knighted in May of the same year.

He continued to sit at the High Court until shortly before his death at age 59 at his London home, 33 Lancaster Gate, from acute bronchitis and pneumonia. He was buried at Brookwood Cemetery.

== Family ==
Byrne married Henrietta Johnstone, on 13 August 1874. She was the daughter of James Gulland of Newton, of Wemyss, Fifeshire.

== Arms ==
Coat of arms of Edmund Widdrington Byrne

Motto
Certavi Et Vici

Parliament of the United Kingdom
Preceded by William Thomas Makins	Member of Parliament for Walthamstow; 1892–1897	Succeeded by Sam Woods
