= Neil Gerrard =

British politician

Member of Parliament for Walthamstow
- In office 9 April 1992 – 12 April 2010
- Preceded by: Hugo Summerson
- Succeeded by: Stella Creasy

Personal details
- Born: 3 July 1942 (age 84) Farnworth, England, UK
- Party: Labour
- Spouse: Marion Fitzgerald (m. 1968; div. 1983)
- Education: Wadham College, Oxford; London South Bank University

Neil Francis Gerrard (born 3 July 1942) is a British Labour Party politician who was the Member of Parliament (MP) for Walthamstow from 1992 until 2010.

== Early life ==
Gerrard was born in Farnworth, England, and educated at Manchester Grammar School and Wadham College, Oxford where he was awarded a BA degree in natural science in 1964. He later studied at the Chelsea College of Science and Technology where he received a MEd in Education in 1973. He received a Diploma in Professional Studies in Education (DPSE) from the Polytechnic of the South Bank in 1983.

From 1965 he taught at the Queen Elizabeth's Grammar School for Boys, Barnet, leaving in 1968 to take up the position of lecturer in chemistry and later in computing at Hackney College, where he remained until his election to parliament 24 years later.

He was elected as a councillor in the London Borough of Waltham Forest in 1973; he was the leader of the Labour group from 1983, and the leader of the Council from 1986 until he left the council in 1990.

== Parliamentary career ==
He was selected to contest the Chingford constituency at the 1979 general election but was defeated by the sitting Conservative MP Norman Tebbit by 12,383 votes. He was elected to the House of Commons at the 1992 general election for Walthamstow, when he unseated the one-term Tory Hugo Summerson by 3,022 votes. He received 45.7% of the vote, compared to his Conservative opponent who received 37.2% of the vote.

He made his maiden speech on 12 May 1992.

In Parliament he served on the environment select committee from 1995 until he was made a Parliamentary Private Secretary (PPS) to the Financial Secretary to the Treasury Dawn Primarolo following the 1997 General Election. He resigned as Primarolo's PPS just a few months later in 1997 over lone-parent benefits cuts introduced by the Secretary of State for Social Security Harriet Harman. He served on several select committees and was a member of the administration committee since the 2005 general election. He was the chairman of the all-party groups on AIDS and on refugees.

He is a left-winger within the Labour Party, and was a member of the Socialist Campaign Group and formerly a member of Campaign for Nuclear Disarmament's national council. In the 1990s he was a director of the Theatre Royal, Stratford East.

Gerrard announced on 23 February 2007 that he would be standing down as an MP at the next general election.

== Personal life ==
Gerrard married Marian Fitzgerald in 1968; the couple had two sons, but they divorced in 1983. He has lived in Walthamstow for the past 50 years, and used to own a racing greyhound with fellow MP Harry Cohen which, although now retired, raced at the Walthamstow Dog Track.

Parliament of the United Kingdom
| Preceded by Hugo Summerson | Member of Parliament for Walthamstow; 1992 – 2010 | Succeeded by Stella Creasy |
