= Sam Woods (politician) =

British trade unionist and politician

Sam Woods

Sam Woods (10 May 1846 – 23 November 1915) was a British trade unionist and politician who served as a Member of Parliament (MP) in the 1890s.

Born at Peasley Cross in St Helens, Woods began working in coal mining at the age of seven. He was elected as a pit checkweighman in 1875 and became strongly involved in trade unionism, joining the Lancashire and Cheshire Miners' Federation in 1881. When this merged into the Miners' Federation of Great Britain (MFGB) in 1889, Woods became the organisation's first vice president.

In the 1892 general election, Woods was elected as a Lib–Lab MP for Ince. In Parliament, he agitated for the Eight Hours Bill, and in 1894 he was elected as the Secretary of the Parliamentary Committee of the Trades Union Congress (TUC). He lost his seat at the 1895 general election, but was re-elected for Walthamstow at a by-election in 1897. However, he lost the seat in 1900 following confusion over his stance on the Second Boer War.

While broadly supportive of the Labour Representation Committee, Woods remained a Liberal and joined the National Democratic League. His health failing, he resigned his TUC post in 1904, but retained his vice presidency of the MFGB to prevent Robert Smillie gaining election.

An elderly persons' home is named after him in Ashton in Makerfield.

Parliament of the United Kingdom
| Preceded by Henry Blundell-Hollinshead-Blundell | Member of Parliament for Ince; 1892–1895 | Succeeded by Henry Blundell-Hollinshead-Blundell |
| Preceded by Edmund Widdrington Byrne | Member of Parliament for Walthamstow; 1897–1900 | Succeeded by David John Morgan |
Trade union offices
| Preceded by Thomas Aspinwall | President of the Lancashire and Cheshire Miners' Federation; 1890s?–1908 | Succeeded by Thomas Greenall |
| New office | Vice-President of the Miners' Federation of Great Britain; 1889–1909 | Succeeded by Robert Smillie |
| Preceded by Charles Fenwick | Secretary of the Parliamentary Committee of the TUC; 1894–1904 | Succeeded by W. C. Steadman |
| Preceded by Edward Cowey and James Mawdsley | Trades Union Congress representative to the American Federation of Labour; 1896; With: John Mallinson | Succeeded by Edward Harford and Havelock Wilson |
