= David Thomas Morgan =

British timber merchant (1809–1886)

David Thomas Morgan (17 September 1809 – 14 November 1886) was a British timber merchant, known as a translator of hymns.

== Life ==
Morgan was born in East Ham, and attended a school in Woodford run by Dr. Oake. He traded in timber under his own name, then going into partnership with his cousin, Thomas Samuel Gellibrand, the partners trading as Morgan, Gellibrand & Co. He was also a director of the Surrey Commercial Dock Company.

In 1861 Morgan moved from Leytonstone a short distance to the Clock House, Wood Street, Walthamstow, in the area called Whipps Cross. There he built up a good library. A generation later the building was used by the Salvation Army. He withdrew from the partnership with Gellibrand and David John Morgan, his son, in 1867.

== Family ==
Morgan married in 1839 Mary Ridge, youngest daughter of the late Captain James Brook Ridge, of the East India Company Army. Their children included:

- Henry Thornhill Morgan, eldest son, cleric.
- David John Morgan, partner in Morgan, Gellibrand & Co. and Member of Parliament.
- Charles James Morgan (1855/6–1929), at Radley School to 1872, wood broker as partner of Foy, Morgan & Co.

Mary Morgan died at Oakhurst, South Weald in 1900.

== Translations from Latin ==
Morgan published in 1871 Hymns of the Latin Church, which was printed privately. It was followed by Hymns and Poems of the Latin Church, Translated (1880), a collection with about twice as many translations.

His translations included:

- Ad perennis vitae fontem, as "For Life's Eternal Spring".
- Chorea mutualis sive lessus de sortis et mortis in humanas res imperio by Jacob Balde
- Clarum decus jejunii by Gregory the Great, as "Depths of love with power divine".
- Collaudemus Magdalenae as "Sing we now with praiseful voices".
- Cum me tenent fallacia by Wilhelm Alard.
- Dies irae, dies illa as "The day of wrath, that dreadful day".
- Gloriosus Salvatoris, as "The glories of the Saviour's Name".
- Jam Christi sol justitiae, as "Jesu, Sun of our salvation".
- Labente jam solis rota by Charles Coffin, as "Now with rapid wheel inclining"
- Lugete, pacis Angeli by Charles Coffin, as "Angels of peace, bewail"
- Nato nobis Salvatore by Adam of St Victor, as "Come, let us celebrate the morn"
- Nil laudibus nostris eges by Charles Coffin, as "Father in heaven! Thy glory".
- O esca viatorum, as "Behold the traveller fed".
- O fons amoris, Spiritus by Charles Coffin, as "All-Gracious Spirit, fount of love".
- From the Sequences of Adam of St Victor, 15 pieces.
- O fortis, o clemens Deus by Charles Coffin, as "Unto Thee, O Father, merciful and mighty".
- O Luce qui mortalibus by Charles Coffin, as "God, who in the unapproached light".
- O quam juvat fratres, Deus by Charles Coffin, as "O God, O loving God, by whom Thy Church".
- O quanta qualia sunt illa Sabbata by Peter Abelard, as "O what must be the sabbaths".
- Primo dierum omnium by Gregory the Great, as "Welcome! thou chiefest of all days".
- Qui procedis ab utroque by Adam of St Victor, as "O Comforter, All-blessed one".
- From Quicumque Christum quaeritis by Prudentius, as "Sweet Martyr flowers, fresh from your early dawn".
- Recordare Sanctae Crucis by Bonaventure, as "In the holy Cross delight".
- Rerum Creator omnium by Charles Coffin, as "Maker of all, vouchsafe to bless".
- Rex Christe, factor omnium by Gregory the Great, as "O Thou by Whom the worlds were made".
- Salve Mundi salutare, supposed to be by Bernard of Clairvaux, as "Saviour of the world, to Thee, Blessed One I bow the knee".
- Splendor paternae gloriae by Ambrose, as "O Thou, the Splendour of the Father's glory" (1871) and "O Thou the Brightness of the Father's glory" (1880).
- Stabat mater dolorosa, as "By His Cross the Mother stood, Hanging on its fatal wood".
- Statuta decreto Dei by Charles Coffin, as "Sing we now redeeming love".
- Stola regni laureatus by Adam of St Victor, as "To the apostolic cohort" (1871) and "Glorious cohort apostolic".
- Summi pusillus grex Patris by Guillaume de la Brunetière, as "Little flock, be not afraid".
- Supernae matris gaudia by Adam of St Victor, as "Those endless joys the Church on earth pourtrays".
- Supreme Motor cordium by Charles Coffin, as "O Sovereign Mover of the heart".
- Templi sacratas pande, Sion, fores by Jean-Baptiste de Santeüil, as "Set wide the temple gate".
- Tu Christe nostrum gaudium as "O Christ, our joy, gone up on high".
- Ultricibus nos undique by Charles Coffin, as "Great Searcher of our hearts, whilst Thy, &c."
- Urbs beata Hierusalem dicta pacis visio, as "Hail Jerusalem the blessed, peaceful city, vision dear".
- Ut jucundas cervus undas, aestuans desiderat, as "The thirsty hart pants with desire".
- Urbs Syon inclyta, as "Hail Zion, city of our God".
- Veni creator spiritus, as "Creator Spirit, come in love".
- Veni redemptor gentium, translated as "O Come, Redeemer of Mankind" (1880).
- Veni sancte spiritus, as "Come, Holy Spirit, nigh, And from the Heaven on high".
- Verbum caro factum est, Ex virgine Maria, as "Not made, nor yet created, came".
- Vox clarescat, mens purgetur, as "With hearts renewed, and cleansed from guilt of sin".
- Vox sonora nostri chori, as "Come let our choir, with full accord".

Robert Maude Moorsom's Historical Companion to Hymns Ancient & Modern mentioned four of Morgan's translations included in that collection.
