= Waltham Forest Town Hall =

Municipal building in London, England

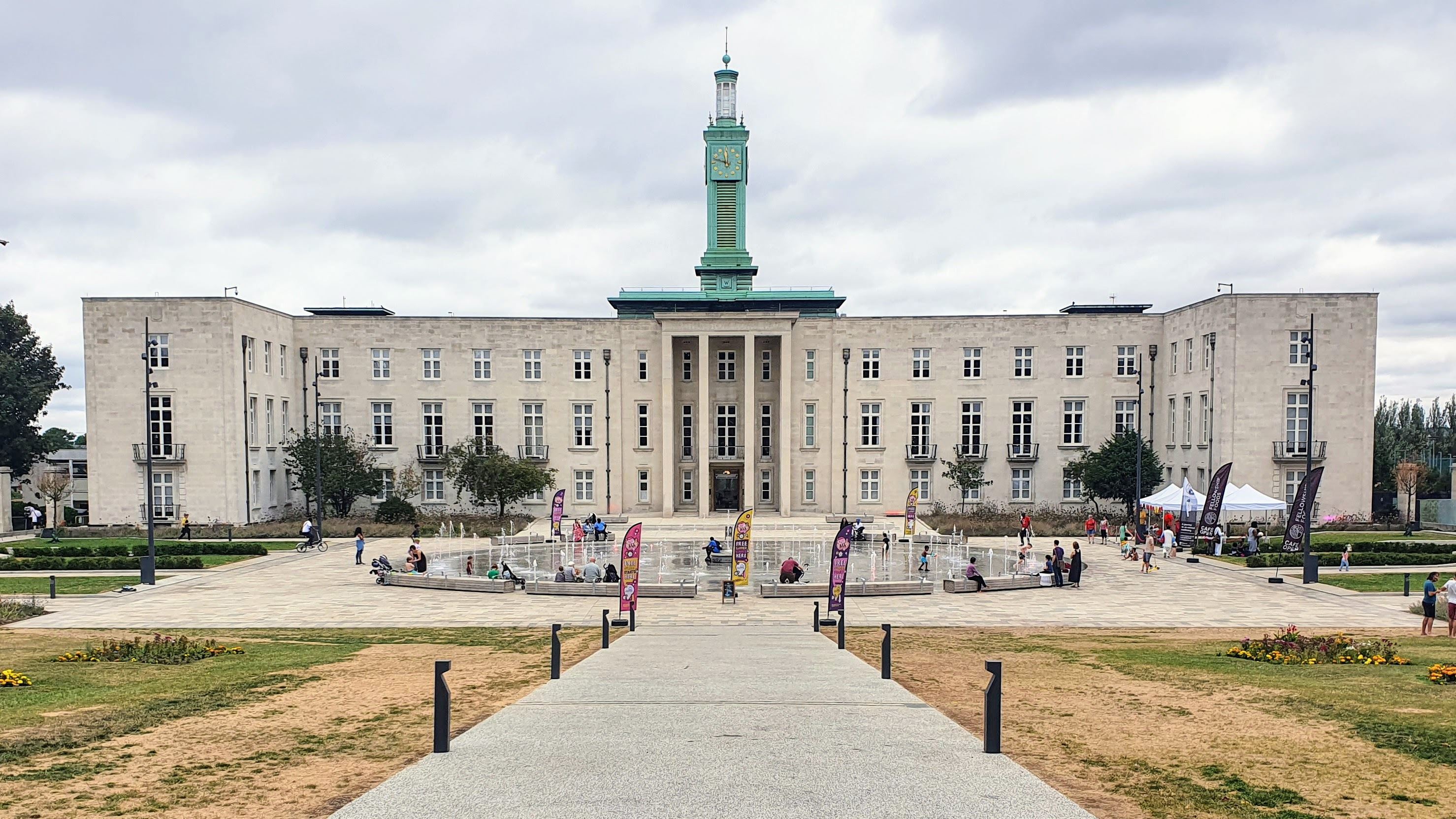
- The south facade from Forest Road in July 2022

- Shown in Waltham Forest
- 51°35′28″N 0°0′49″W
- Location: Walthamstow

History
- Built: 1942

Site notes
- Architect: Philip Dalton Hepworth
- Architectural style: Stripped Classicism

Listed Building – Grade II
- Designated: 9 March 1982
- Reference no.: 1190868

Waltham Forest Town Hall (formerly Walthamstow Town Hall) is a municipal building located in Walthamstow, East London. The town hall, which is the headquarters of Waltham Forest London Borough Council, is a Grade II Listed Building.

== History ==
The first civic building in the area was a single storey public hall in Orford Road, Walthamstow, which probably dated back to the first half of the 19th century. This was demolished and replaced by an Italianate style town hall in Orford Road in 1866.

After the area became an urban district in 1895 and then a municipal borough in 1929, civic leaders decided to procure a purpose-built town hall: the site chosen for the new building had previously been occupied by Chestnuts Farm, also known as Clay Farm. They decided that the new town hall would be flanked to the south east by an assembly hall which would be built in the same architectural style and at the same time as the town hall.

The foundation stone for the new building, in which contemporary artifacts were placed, was laid in 1938. The building was designed by Philip Dalton Hepworth in the stripped classical style. Construction of the building, which was built of Portland stone, was interrupted by the Second World War and not completed until 1942. The design involved a symmetrical main frontage with 19 bays facing onto Forest Road with the end bays projecting forwards; the central section featured a three-bay full-height portico with piers supporting a frieze above containing the words "Walthamstow Town Hall"; there was a tall copper-clad clock tower at roof level. Internally, the principal room was the council chamber which projected to the rear of the building: five statues carved by John Francis Kavanagh were installed on the external walls of the council chamber and six relief sculptures, also by Kavanagh, were erected on the portico piers.

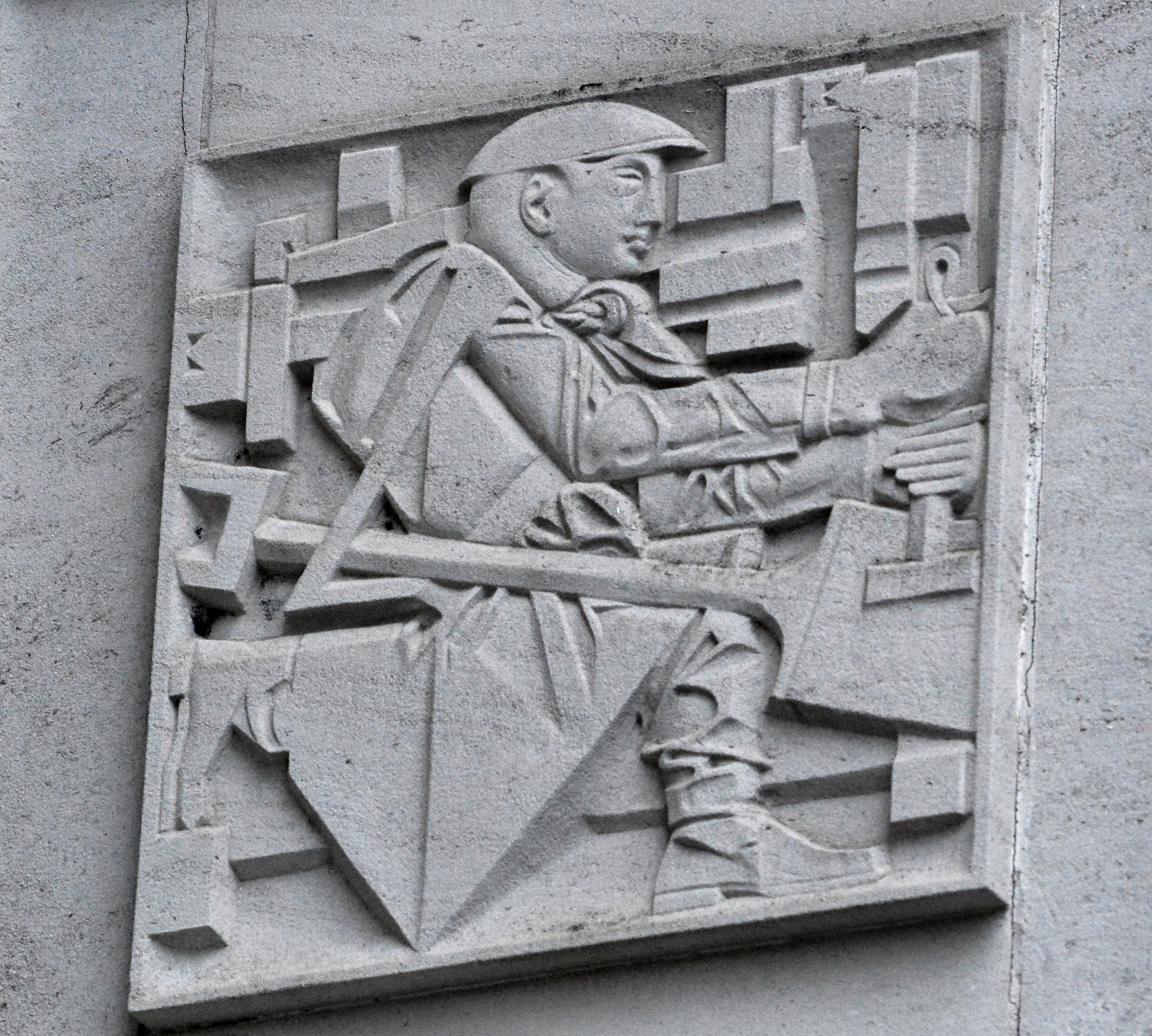
Navvy

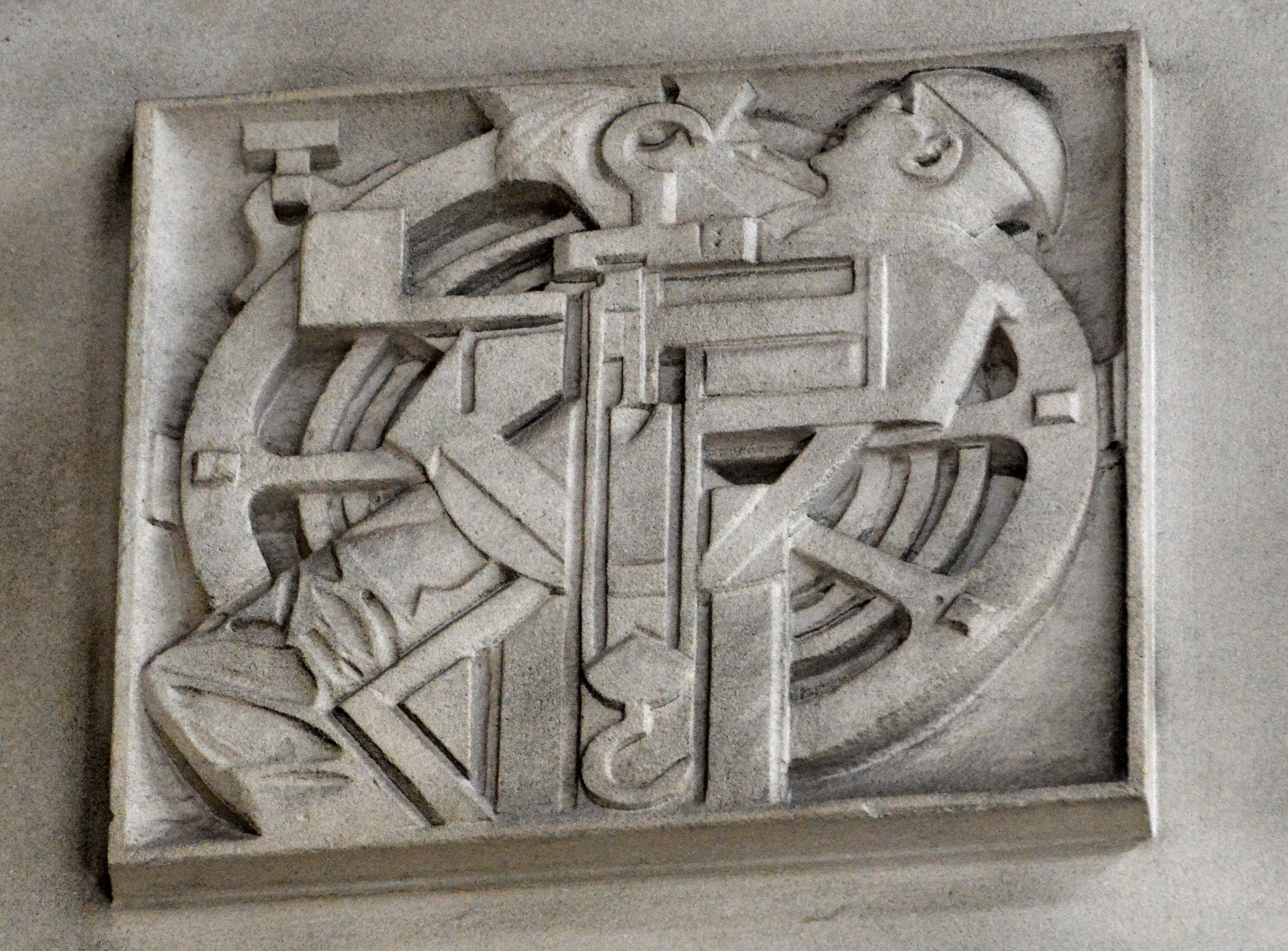
Mechanic

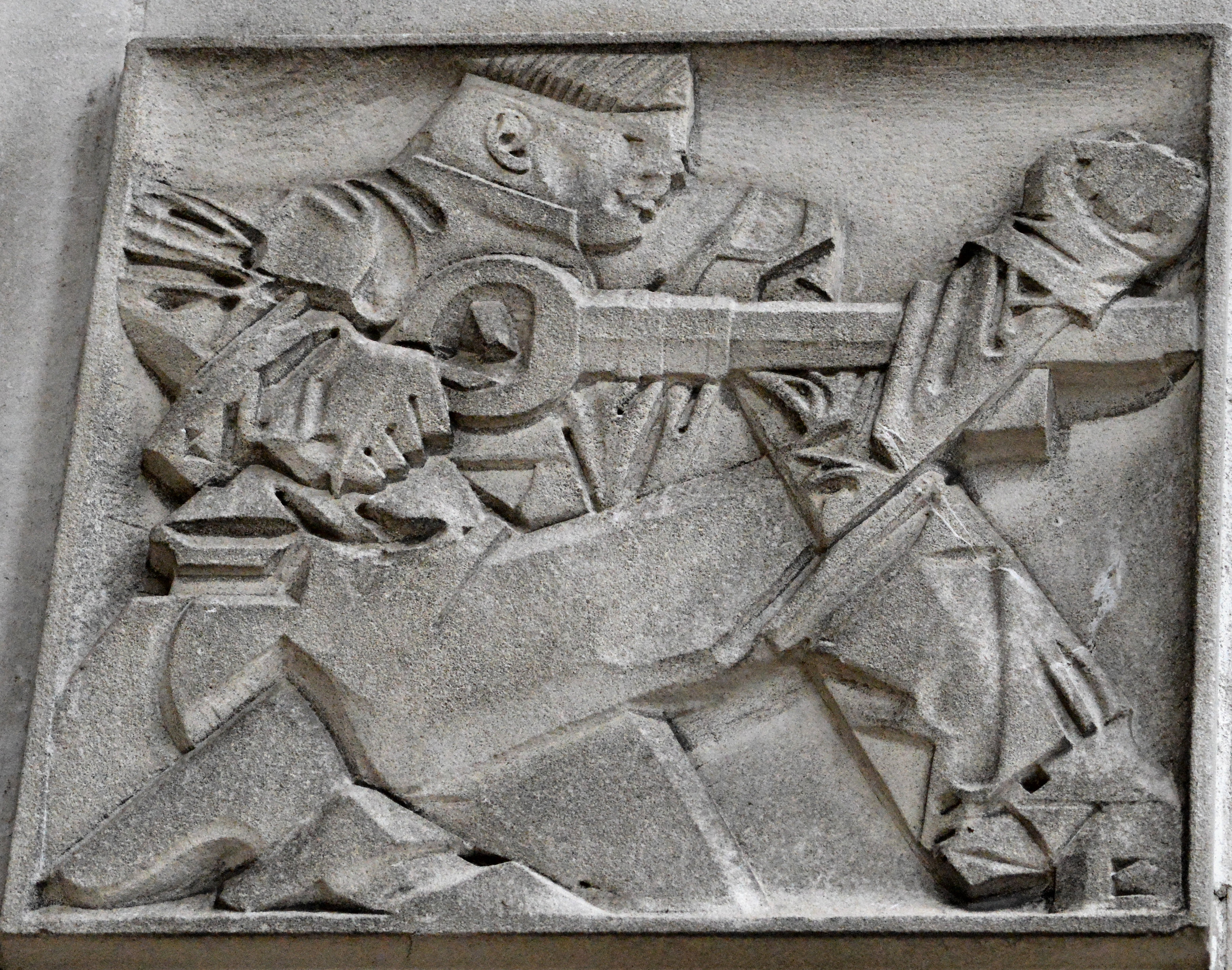
Drilling
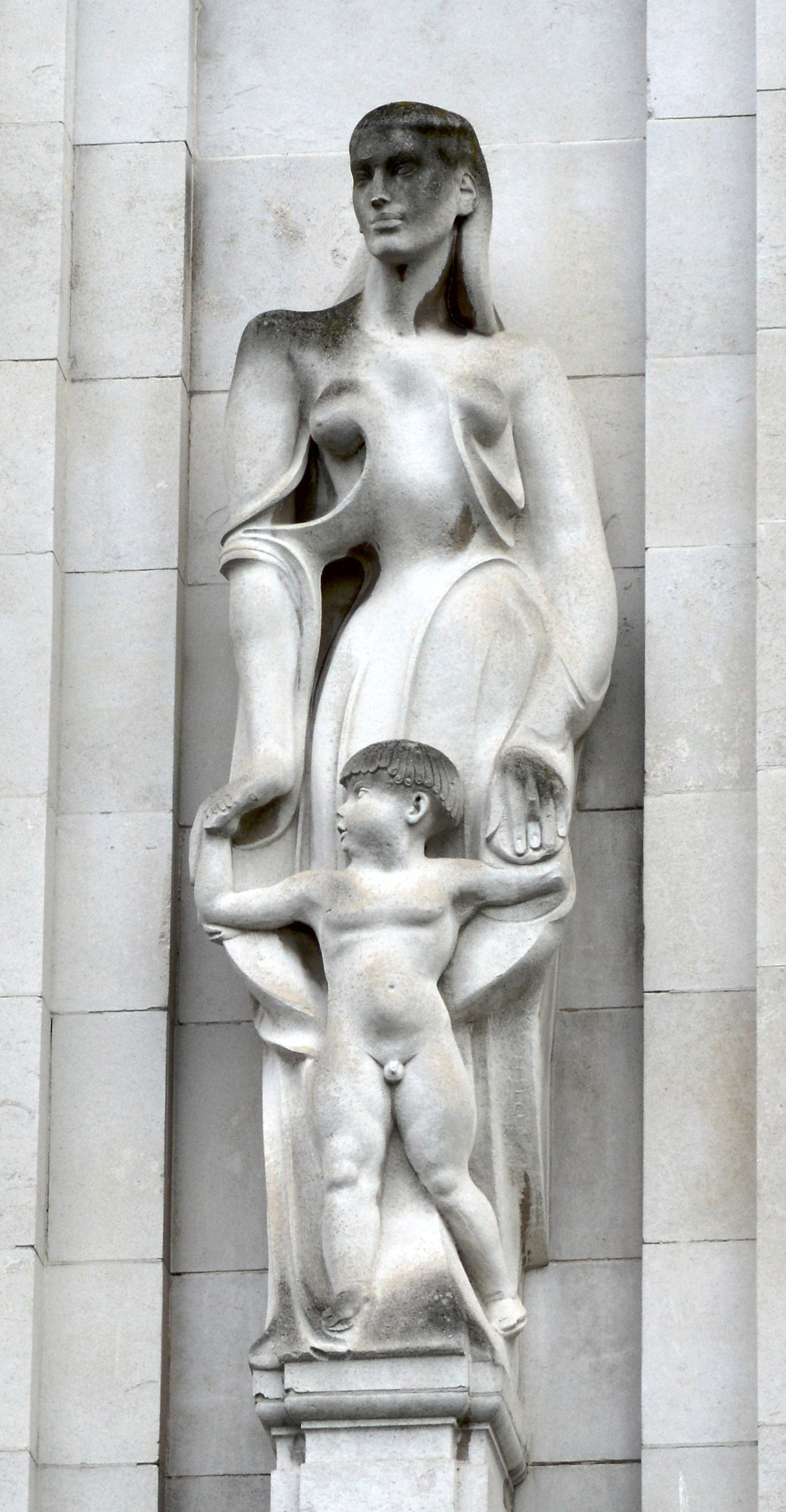
Education

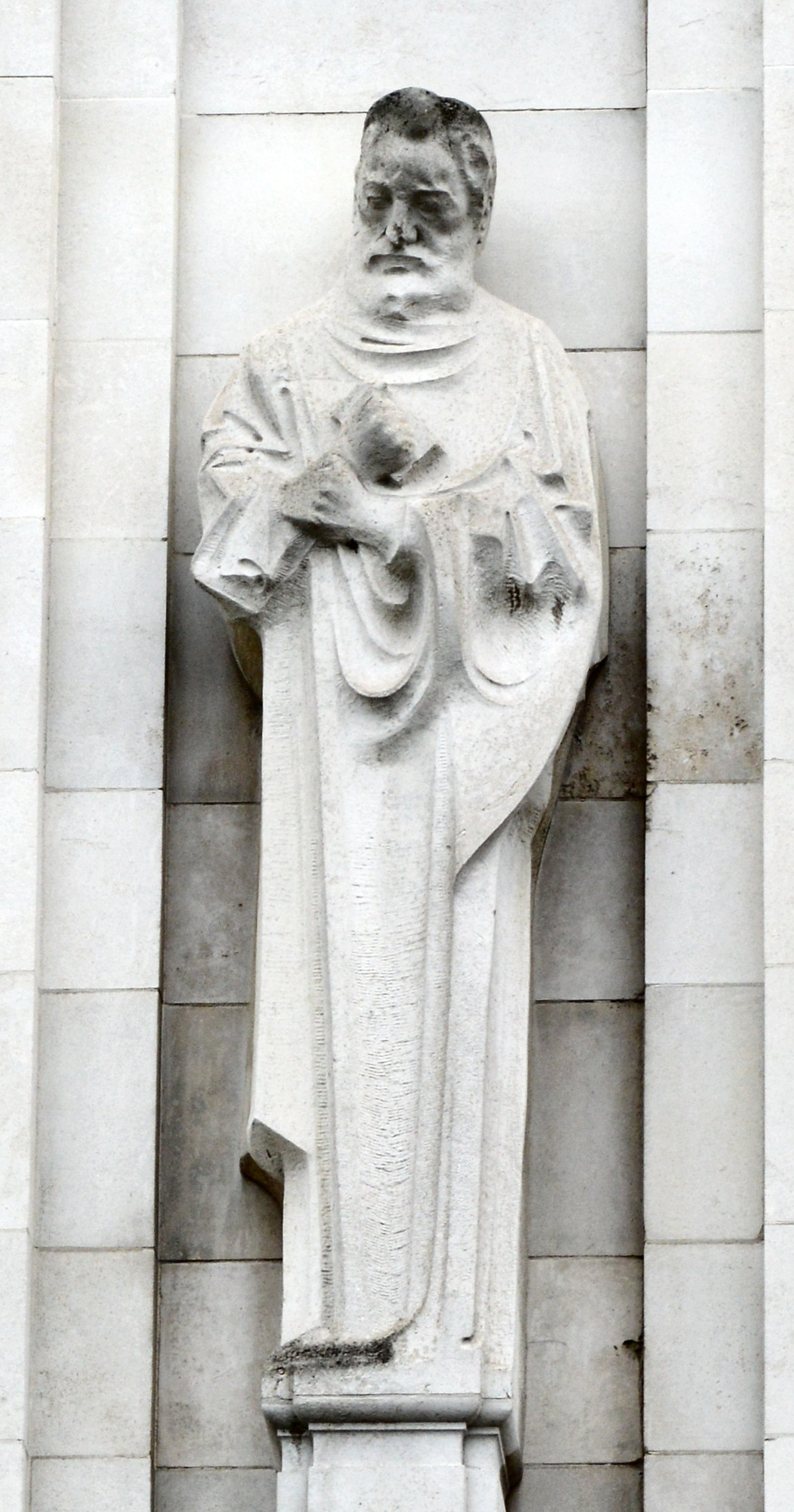
Fellowship

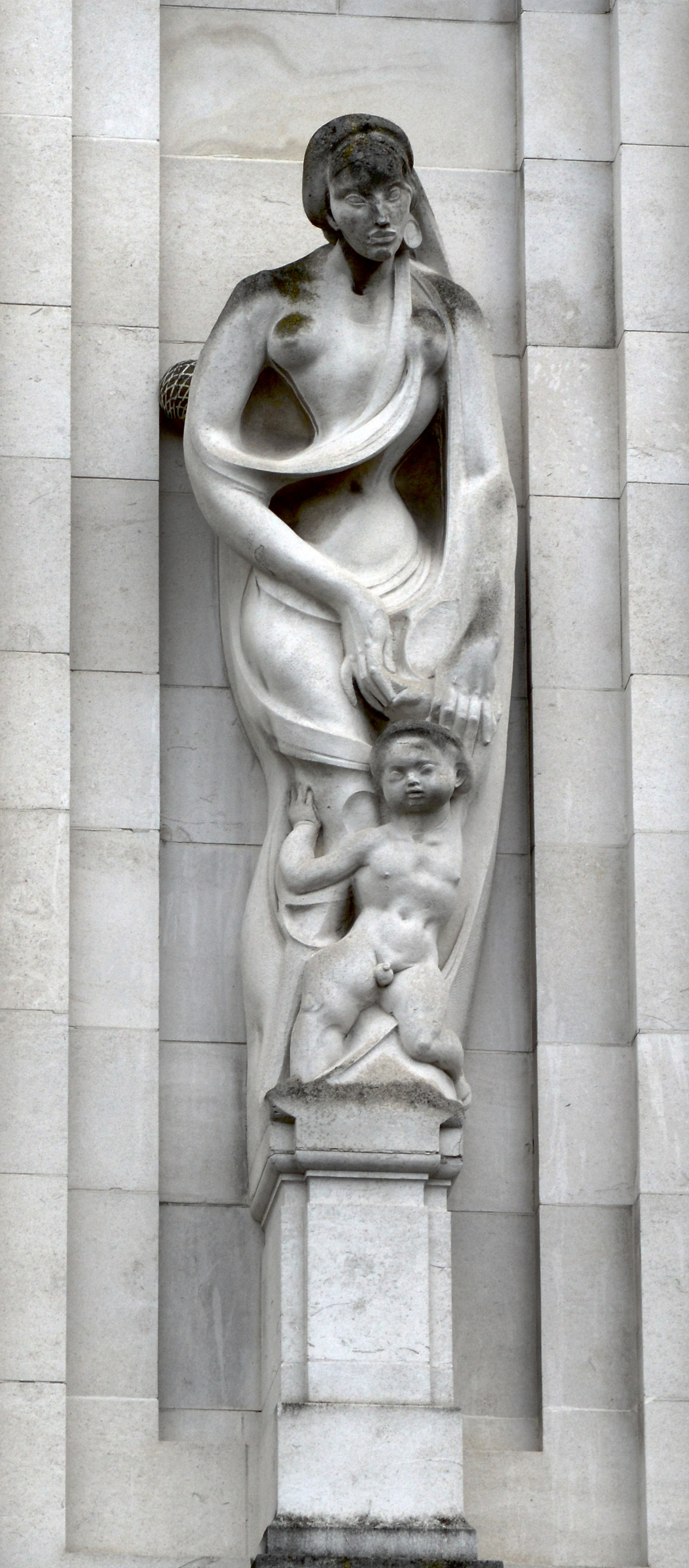
Motherhood

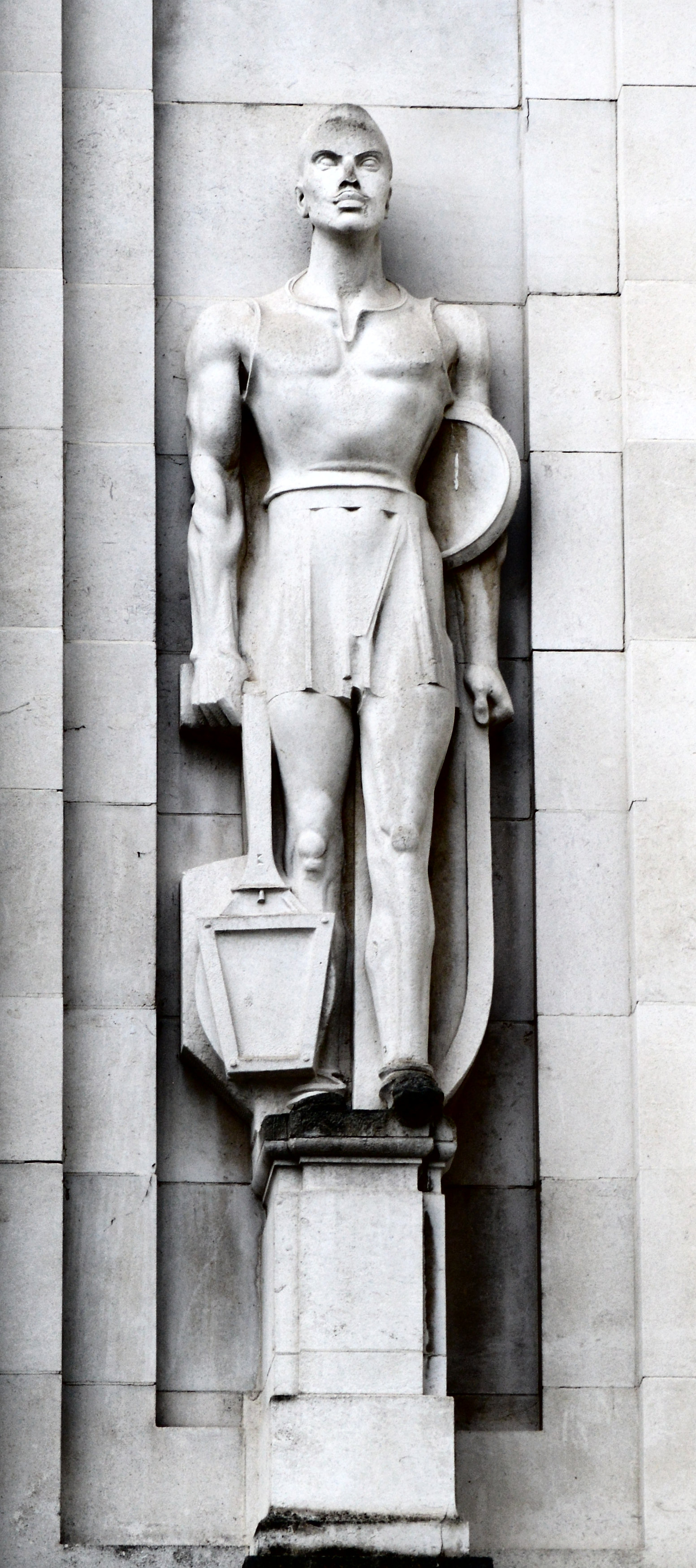
Recreation

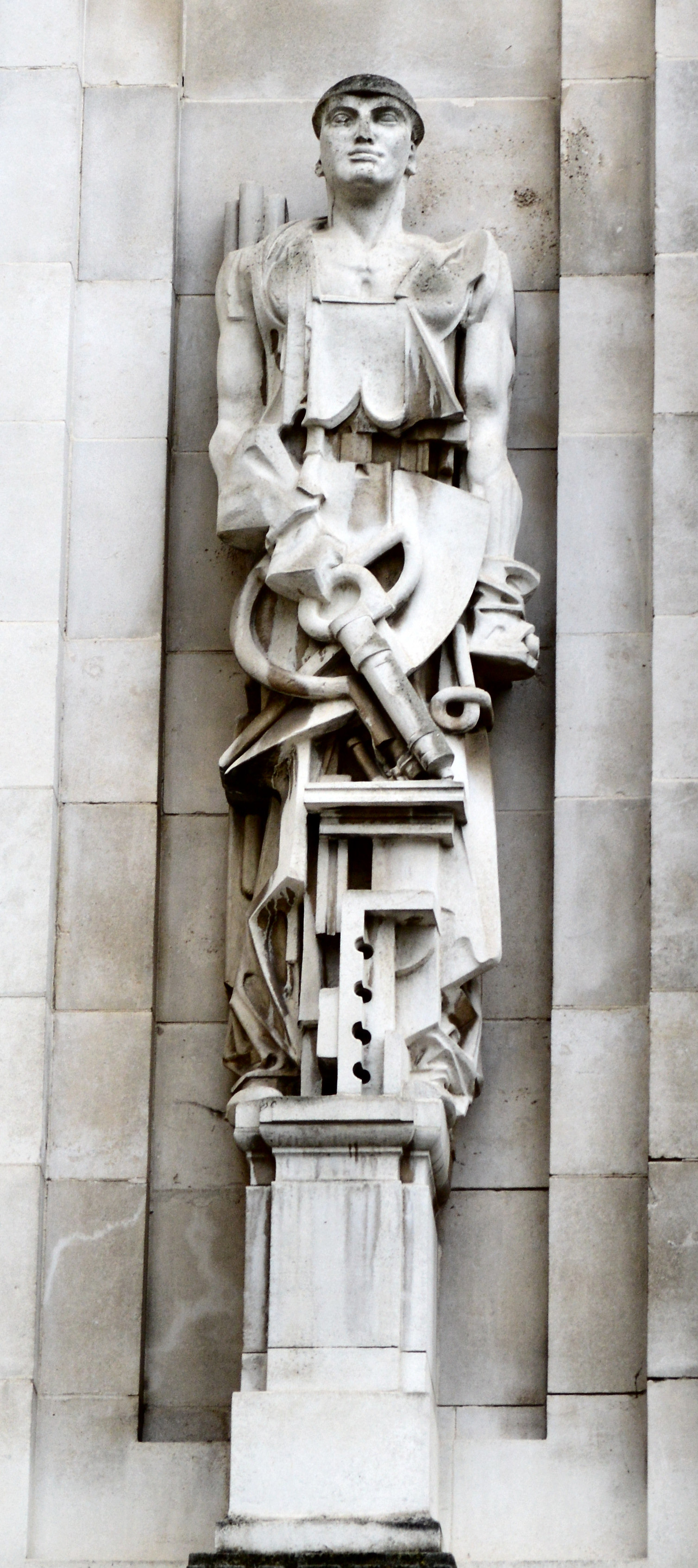
Work

The assembly hall, which was also completed in 1942, was used as a British Restaurant during the Second World War. The town hall continued to serve as the local seat of government after the expanded Waltham Forest London Borough Council was formed in 1965. The assembly hall hosted a concert performance by Yehudi Menuhin in January 1960 and by Plácido Domingo in July 1974. Queen Elizabeth II and the Duke of Edinburgh visited the town hall and had lunch with civic officials in March 2012. The building also hosted the Antiques Roadshow in December 2014 and, again, in January 2015.

The council approved an extensive programme of renovation works to the town hall and the assembly hall in October 2019; the works authorised also included improved landscaping with water jets, night-time illumination and a reflection pool. The renovation of the town hall was completed in 2021 with further changes including the creation of Fellowship Square and the Queen Elizabeth II memorial garden at the rear with a copy of The Arch by Henry Moore.
