= Hugo Summerson =

British politician (born 1950)

Member of Parliament for Walthamstow
- In office 11 June 1987 – 16 March 1992
- Preceded by: Eric Deakins
- Succeeded by: Neil Gerrard

Personal details
- Born: 21 July 1950 (age 75)
- Party: Conservative
- Spouse: Rosie Pitts

Hugo Hawksley Fitzthomas Summerson (born 21 July 1950) is a British Conservative politician.

== Career ==
Summerson contested Barking in 1983, but was beaten by Labour's Jo Richardson by 4,026 votes. At the 1987 general election, Summerson was elected Member of Parliament for Walthamstow, gaining 39% of the vote and ousting the Labour incumbent Eric Deakins. This was against the pro-Labour national swing but broadly in line with the swing elsewhere in Greater London which was pro-Conservative.

His maiden speech was made on 4 November 1987, during the second reading of Urban Development Corporations (Financial Limits) Bill. He used the opportunity to extol the virtues of his constituency: "My constituency is Walthamstow. I have found that many people do not know exactly where Walthamstow is. I recommend that they get on the Victoria line northbound and stay on the train until it stops and they will find themselves in Walthamstow. It is an area with a very interesting history."

Summerson lost the seat at the 1992 general election to the Labour candidate Neil Gerrard, who received 45.7% of the vote to Summerson's 37.2%. Since leaving office, Summerson has worked as a PR consultant, amongst other occupations. He is currently a director of Palatine Properties Ltd.

Parliament of the United Kingdom
| Preceded by Eric Deakins | Member of Parliament for Walthamstow; 1987 – 1992 | Succeeded by Neil Gerrard |
