= 1910 Walthamstow by-election =

Parliamentary by-election

- 1 November 1910
Candidate	Simon	Johnson
Party	Liberal	Conservative
Popular vote	16,673	13,907
Percentage	54.5%	45.5%
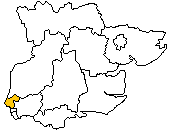
MP before election
John Simon
Liberal
Subsequent MP
John Simon
Liberal

The 1910 Walthamstow by-election was a parliamentary by-election held in England on 1 November 1910 for the UK House of Commons constituency of Walthamstow. It was then a division of Essex, but the area is now part of Greater London.

This was a ministerial by-election. The laws of the time required that an MP who had joined the government had to seek re-election, and the early stages of the campaign saw controversy about whether the election should be contested. However, the main issue in the election was the Osborne judgment, in which the courts had banned trade unions from imposing a political levy on their members. After a prolonged campaign, the outgoing Liberal MP John Simon was re-elected.

== Vacancy ==
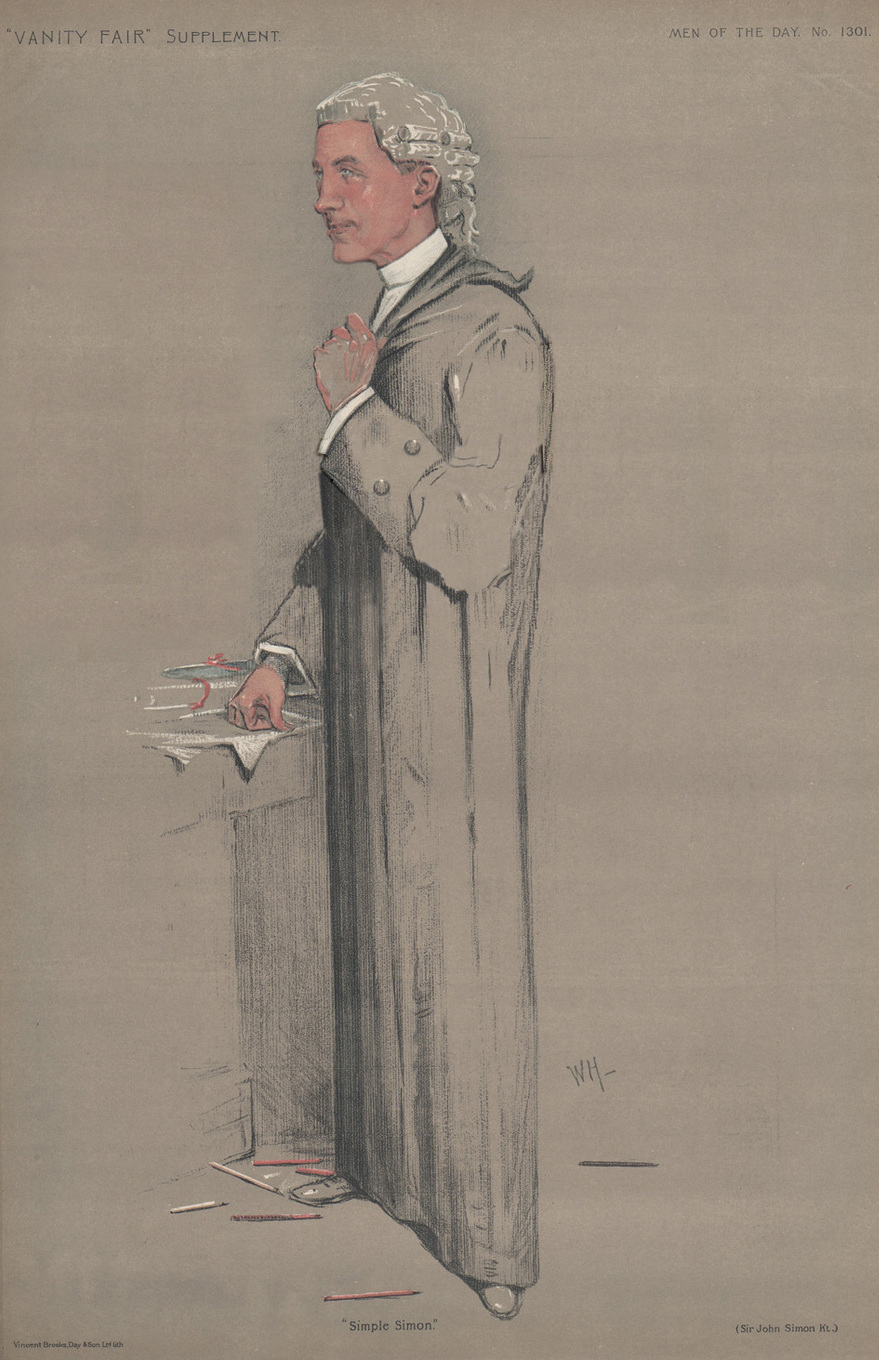
Sir John Simon KC, as caricatured in Vanity Fair on 18 October 1911 with the caption "Simple Simon".

The Liberal Party politician John Simon KC had been Walthamstow's Member of Parliament (MP) since 1906. He was appointed on 6 October 1910 as Solicitor General for England and Wales.

Provisions of the Regency Act 1707, which remained in force until amended in 1919 and repealed in 1926, provided that MPs appointed as ministers automatically vacated their seats in Parliament. They were then allowed to stand for re-election, in what were known as ministerial by-elections, which were not usually contested by the other major parties.

The Times newspaper noted that the relevant Act had been passed in the reign of Queen Anne "to prevent the Court from swamping the House of Commons with placemen and pensioners", and described the process as "anomalous" and "indefensible" in the 20th century.

== Choice of polling day ==
There was some uncertainty in the constituency as to the procedure for elections when a seat was vacated during a parliamentary recess, when the writ could not be moved in the Commons in the usual way. However, on 11 October The Times newspaper explained that the Speaker could not issue a writ of election until he had received a certificate signed by two MPs declaring that the member in question had accepted an office of profit under the crown, accompanied by a copy of the issue of the London Gazette in which the appointment was announced. Those formalities had already been complied with, the appointment having been gazetted on 6 October, and an election was expected before the recess ended.

On 14 October, the London Gazette carried the required notice from the Speaker, giving 6 days warning of his intention to issue a writ for the by-election. On the 17th, the High Sheriff of Essex decided that polling would take place on Thursday 1 November. The decision was formally announced on 21 October, when the date for nominations was set at 25 October. The Liberals had preferred Saturday 29th, which would have been more convenient for commuters, whereas the Conservatives pointed out that Saturday was inconvenient for tradesmen.

This led to the Conservative candidate being heckled at public meetings, because a mid-week election would favour the Conservatives, and a public squabble developed between the two candidates. The Liberal agent swore an affidavit alleging that in negotiations with the High Sheriff over polling dates the Conservatives has repudiated an earlier agreement on Saturday polling, and on 30 October the Conservative candidate responded by releasing all the correspondence.

== Candidates ==
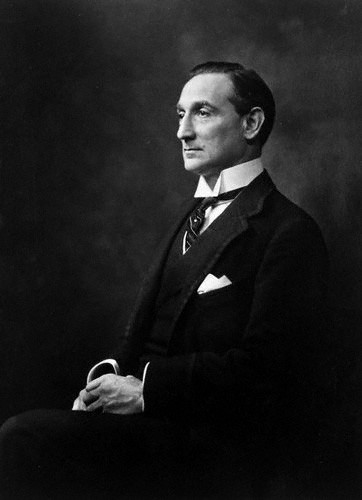
Rufus Isaacs, Simon's predecessor as Solicitor General

Ministers forced to seek re-election were often unopposed, as had happened at Reading earlier that year when Simon's predecessor Rufus Isaacs had been returned unopposed after his appointment as Solicitor General. Some senior members local Conservatives wanted to follow the example set in Reading, but on 8 October a majority of the local party selected as their candidate 41-year-old Stanley Johnson, who had been Simon's opponent at the last general election, in January 1910. Johnson was a solicitor in the firm of Downer and Johnson, based in London Wall, and had been a member of Hackney Council for 9 years. He described his first priorities for the campaign as being support for the Osborne judgment, a case brought by a Walthamstow trade unionist which restricted the ability of unions to impose a political levy on their members. He also stressed his opposition to the payment of MPs, and proclaimed himself a "whole hogger" for tariff reform.

The Liberal candidate, 37-year-old Simon, was a barrister who had risen fast in politics. The son of a Congregationalist minister in Bath, he was educated at Fettes College and then at Wadham College, before becoming a Fellow of All Souls. In 1903 he had been the British government's counsel in the Alaska boundary dispute, and he entered the Commons in 1906 at the age of 33, making a strong impression with his speeches. He became a King's Counsel in 1908, at the unusually young age of 35, and developed a large practice, serving as standing counsel to the University of Oxford. At the time of the election, he was a widower with three children.

== Constituency ==
Walthamstow in 1910 was a very different area to when the constituency was created in 1885. The expansion of London had transformed it from a rural area of Essex to a mostly urban suburb of the capital. Brick-fields and market gardens had been replaced by rows of terraced houses for the 10,000 commuters who travelled each morning on the Great Eastern Railway from Hoe Street station to Liverpool Street station in London.

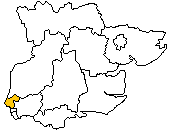
Walthamstow within Essex in 1910

Constituency boundaries had not been revised since 1885, so this growth had left Walthamstow's electorate one of the largest in England. The number of voters had nearly quadrupled, from 11,233 in 1885 to 39,117 in 1910; more people voted for the losing candidate in January 1910 than were on the electoral register in 1892. By contrast, the rural Saffron Walden division of Essex had seen its electorate fall slightly below the total of 9,306 who registered in 1885.

The dominance of commuting voters forced candidates to adopt a different style of campaigning than was usual elsewhere in England. In rural areas, candidates held meetings on village greens or at market fairs, while in industrial areas they held midday meetings at factory gates or at the pitheads. Neither approach was viable in Walthamstow, where electioneering took place in the evenings after the commuters had returned.

There remained a few agricultural workers at the Woodford end of the constituency, and some middle-class areas on the borders of Epping Forest, near Leytonstone and Woodford, but the electorate was mostly urban and working class. There were some poor districts in Walthamstow, but no slums. The working-class voters were well-housed, but mostly lived almost hand-to-mouth. House rents were quoted weekly, and most of the furniture was also rented. Tenure in these homes appears to have been short: during the by-election campaign, it was reported that 12,000 of the 39,000 voters had moved house since the electoral register was compiled in July 1909.

The reforms of 1885 had nearly doubled the number of people entitled to vote, but still fell a long way short of universal suffrage. Voting was subject to a property qualification which excluded 40% of adult men, and no women were allowed to vote until 1918.

== Issues ==
The electoral register had not been revised since the general election in January, but the issues had changed. The controversy over the People's Budget was expected to remain a hot topic in the campaign, but the proposal to remove the veto power of the House of Lords had been taken to a constitutional conference in June in an attempt to find a compromise, removing it from the current debate. The new issue was the Osborne judgment.

Osborne himself was a porter at Clapton railway station, and secretary of the Walthamstow branch of the Amalgamated Society of Railway Servants. He was a member of the local Liberal Association and had supported Simon at the last two elections. The political funds run the unions had been used to pay a wage to Labour Members of Parliament, who at that time received no salary. Osborne and his colleagues in the Trade Union Political Freedom League wanted to end what they called the "barrier of Socialism" in trade unions, to allow political freedom to trade unionists who were Liberals or Conservatives. He supported the idea of paying MPs a salary, as an alternative to their funding by unions.

== Campaign ==
Simon's election address was issued on 10 October. It consisted of only three paragraphs, which explained why he was seeking re-election, but included no statement of either his own political views or the programme of the government that he had just joined. He explained that omission in the second paragraph:

In January-last, after a long and arduous contest, you for the second time returned me by a large majority to the House of Commons. The views which I expressed then I still hold. These views are well known to you; and inasmuch as I am now appealing, after so short an interval, to precisely the same voters, you will not expect me in this document to set forth at length my political opinions.

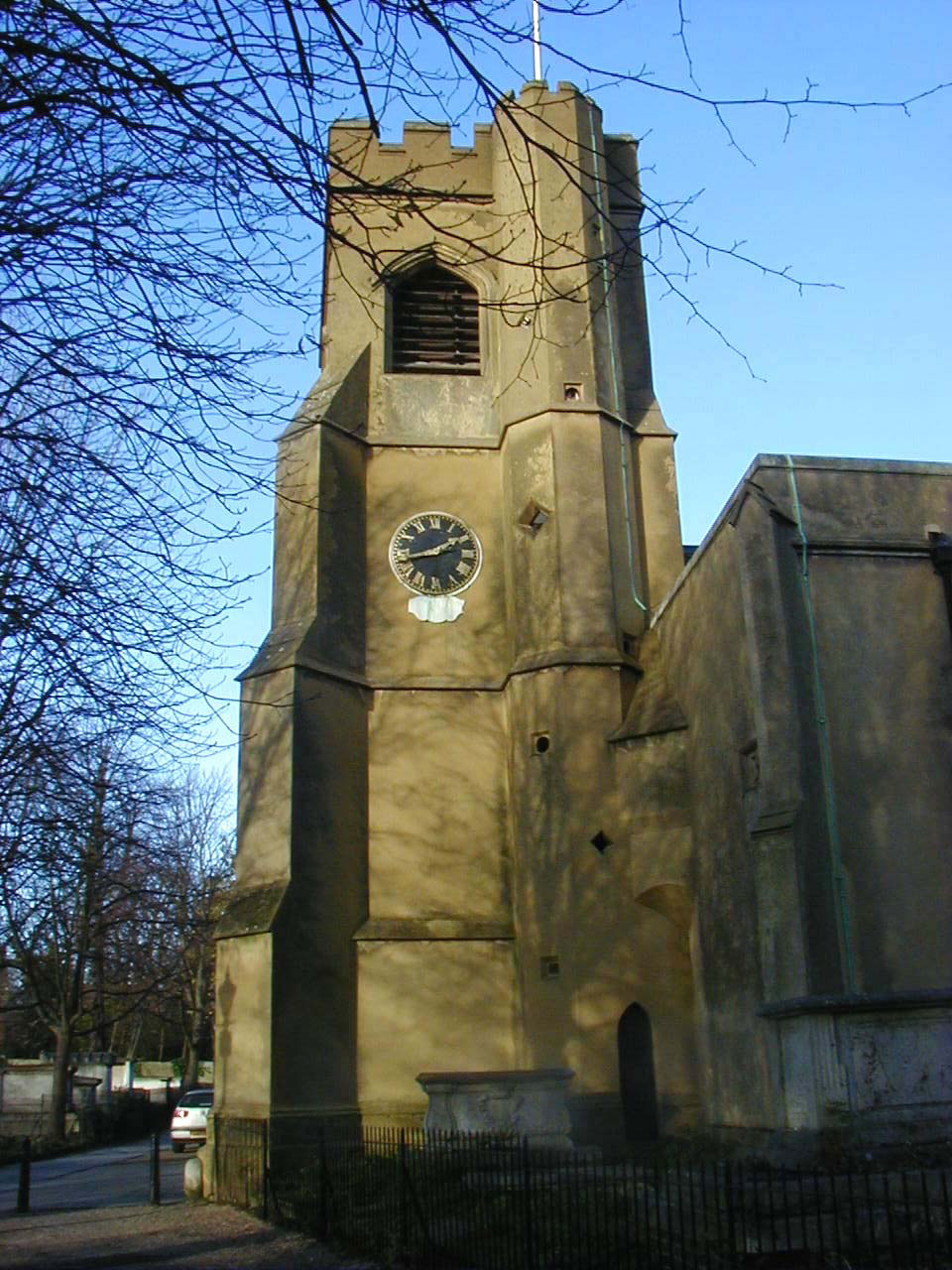
St. Mary's Church, Walthamstow, whose vicar intervened in the by-election

The campaign began the same day, and The Times noted that the Liberals were better prepared. Both candidates held public meetings, and Simon's meeting at Woodford was chaired by the Conservative Andrew Johnson, who disapproved of the opposition to a ministerial re-election and quoted the vicar of Woodford as saying that the infliction of the contest was "hardly fair". On 13 October, The Times published a letter from the vicar of Walthamstow, H. D. Hampden, who regretted that a contest had been forced. Hampden wrote that Simon had made no enemies in the constituency, and that the by-election could have been a chance to thank the MP for his work rather than putting him to the trouble and expense of an election. The following day, The Times published a letter from the vicar of Woodford, Henry Sanders, who supported Hampden, and said that opposition to the "futility of these needless and wasteful by-elections" was shared across supporters of all parties.

At that meeting in Woodford, and later in the day at Walthamstow, Simon noted that the Osborne judgment was "a kind of Walthamstow product" and that it was natural for it to be a concern during the election. He explained that as a law officer he could not speak freely on what would be done about the case, but defended his constituent Osborne as "a real trade unionist". He said that his main concern was that "the path to Parliament should be open to men without the distinction of class or income", and that it would not be right for any Liberal government to leave the matter unsettled.

In his election address, Johnson supported the Osborne judgment's ban on a political levy, saying that the union's "point of unity is not on political, but on industrial questions". He said that the ruling "secures the Imperial Parliament against the entering into it of men pledged actually or by implication to vote as ordered by more or less secret bodies by whom they are supported", and pledged "no compromise" in upholding it. He also opposed the payment of MPs.

On 12 October, Simon criticised Conservative politicians who claimed to support the entry of working-class people to Parliament, but seemed content that they had the right to enter, without removing the obstacles in their path. The same day, Johnson responded to criticism of his decision to contest the election, saying that the Osborne judgment was an important matter of domestic politics which had arisen in that constituency, and that as an industrial community they should have a chance of deciding on it.

=== Trade union and suffragist interventions ===
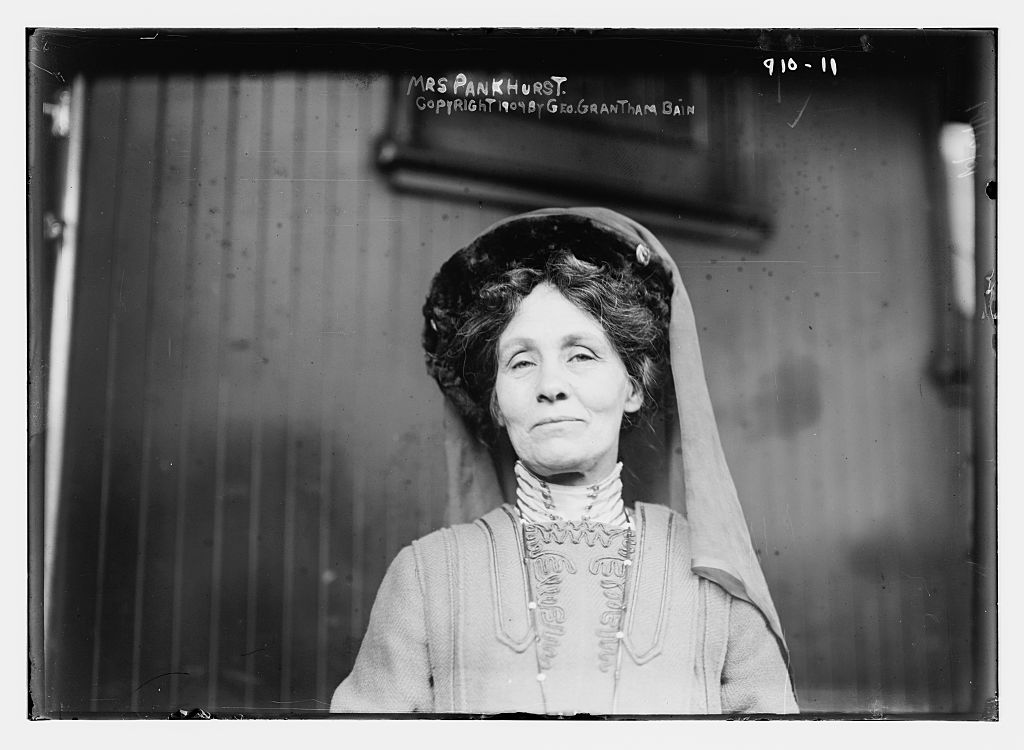
Emmeline Pankhurst, whose Women's Social and Political Union opposed Simon's re-election

Walthamstow trade unionists met on 14 October with the local branches of the Independent Labour Party (ILP) and the Social Democratic Federation, to discuss the election. The delegates voted by 47 votes to 25 to oppose Simon's re-election unless he promised that a Bill to reverse the Osborne judgment would be introduced in the Commons. A delegation was sent to meet Simon.

The local ILP had already passed a similar motion, and confirmed that they would not accept the payment of MPs as a reversal of the judgment, and a member of the delegation confirmed that they did not seek a declaration from Simon alone, but a pledge from the government that the unions would be allowed absolute control of their own funds. Meanwhile, the Labour Party was preparing a manifesto on trade unions, in which it said that the Osborne judgment was proof that there was one law for the rich and another for the poor; the unions could not do their job unless they had the power to support MPs.

Osborne pronounced himself satisfied with Simon's answers to his questions, and promised his personal support for the Solicitor-General. The delegation from the Trade Union and Socialist Election Committee met Simon on 19 October, after which he wrote to them, explaining that he was not a member of the Cabinet and could not commit the government. He repeated his commitment to the payment of MPs, which both the Liberal and Labour parties had voted in 1906, but acknowledged that this might not be a complete solution. He also warned against supporting his opponent, writing that he would "be astonished if workmen in this division were so misled as to vote for 'Tariff and Tories'".

The committee's response was that the government could have made a substantive response if it had wanted to, and that since it had not done so they would campaign against the government candidate. Their manifesto, published on 24 October, called for voters to defeat Simon because of his failure to support the overturn of the judgment; but Simon's supporters said that this would make little difference, because these socialists had never voted Liberal.

Further opposition to Simon came from supporters of Women's suffrage (the right to vote in elections). The Women's Social and Political Union, the Women's Freedom League, and the Men's League for Women's Suffrage all advised electors to "keep the Liberal out". Hundreds of special interest groups organised street-corner meetings, and the suffragists held a procession which included a prisoner on a lorry.

=== Campaign concludes ===
When nominations were submitted on 26 October, there were nearly 100 nomination papers for Johnson, and 126 for Simon. Simon's papers included one signed wholly by doctors, one from nonconformist ministers, and eight signed by trade unionists.

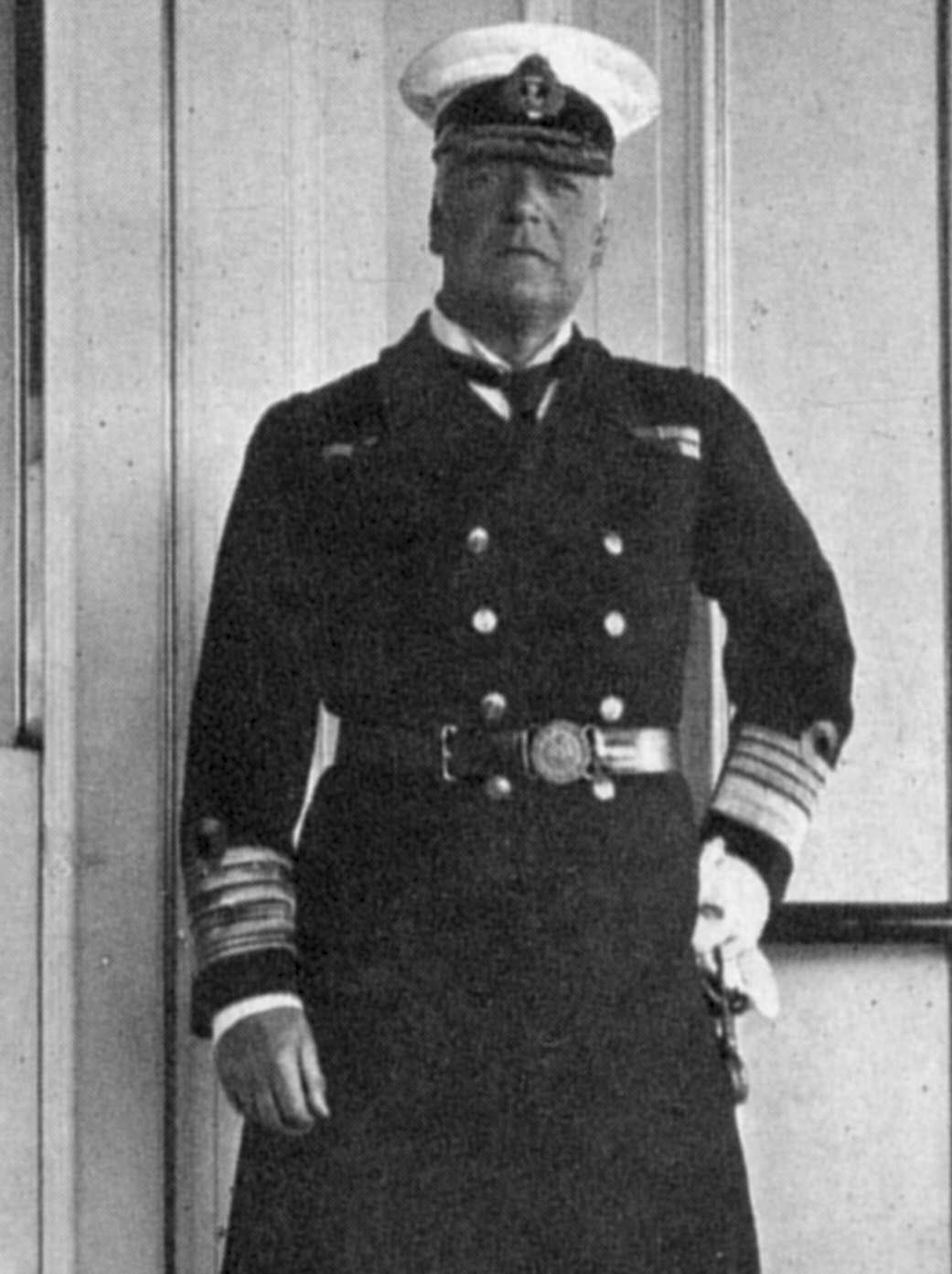
Lord Charles Beresford, who campaigned for the Conservative candidate in Walthamstow

The committee of trade unionists had hoped that 1,000 or 2,000 voters would follow their recommendation to oppose Simon, but as the campaign concluded it appeared that their only about 200 voters would follow their lead. In the end, both candidates agreed that the dominant issue had been tariff reform; but The Times correspondent reported that the campaign had engaged "nobody but the partisan who is always ready for a fight.

The campaign ended on 31 October with mass meetings. A Conservative meeting of 6,000 people at the Walthamstow skating rink was addressed by Lord Charles Beresford, while Russell Rea MP spoke to a crowd of 10,000 at the Liberal meeting in the Walthamstow recreation ground.

== Result ==
1910 Walthamstow by-election
Party	Candidate	Votes	%	±%
Liberal	John Simon	16,673	54.5	+1.2
Conservative	Stanley Johnson	13,907	45.5	−1.2
Majority		2,766	9.0	+2.4
Turnout		30,580	78.2	−6.8
Registered electors		39,117		
Liberal hold		Swing	+1.2	

The votes were counted on 2 November, and the result was declared from Walthamstow town hall at 1pm: Simon was re-elected. The turnout had fallen by almost 9% since the January election, but Simon's majority had increased a little, from 2,195 votes in January to 2,766 in the by-election.

The declaration was followed by speeches from both candidates. The Liberal victory procession that evening was nearly a mile long, as Simon was drawn in an open carriage through the main streets.

== Aftermath ==
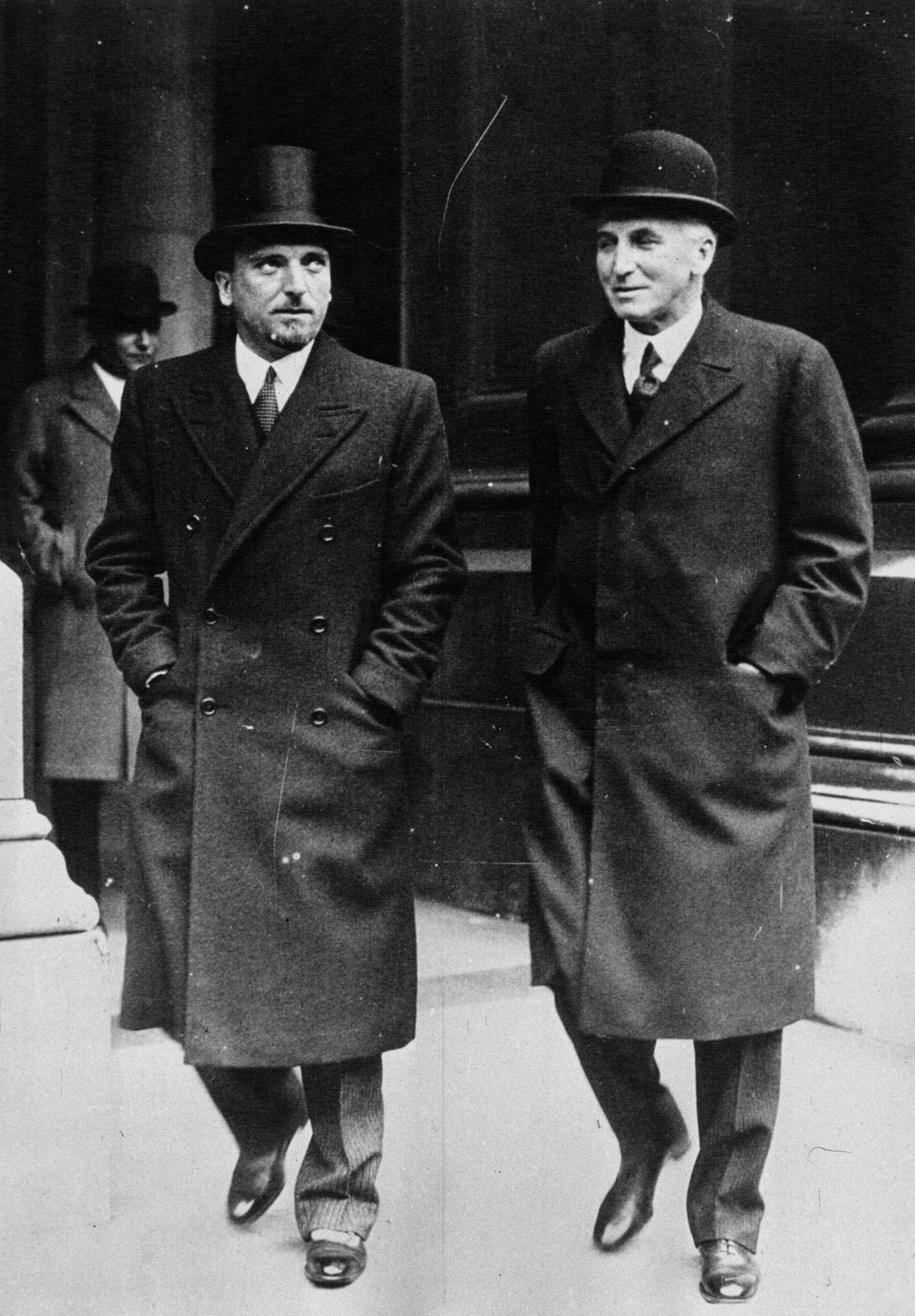
Viscount Simon (right) in 1932 with Italian Foreign Minister Dino Grandi

This was the last by-election before Parliament was dissolved on 28 November for the general election in December 1910. Simon was returned, but Johnson did not contest that election. Johnson became Mayor of Hackney in 1914, and at the 1918 general election he defeated Simon in the newly created Walthamstow East constituency.

Johnson retired from Parliament at the 1924 election, but Simon returned in 1922 as MP for Spen Valley. He went on to become one of only three people to have served as Home Secretary, Foreign Secretary and Chancellor of the Exchequer, before being ennobled in 1940 as Viscount Simon, when he became Lord Chancellor.

== Previous general election result ==
General election January 1910: Walthamstow
Party	Candidate	Votes	%	±%
Liberal	John Simon	17,726	53.3	−4.2
Conservative	Stanley Johnson	15,531	46.7	+4.2
Majority		2,195	6.6	−8.4
Turnout		33,257	85.0	+11.1
Registered electors		39,117		
Liberal hold		Swing	-4.2	

== See also ==
- Walthamstow constituency
- Walthamstow
- 1897 Walthamstow by-election
- List of United Kingdom by-elections (1900–1918)
