= David John Morgan =

British politician

David John Morgan (25 April 1844 – 28 February 1917) was a British businessman and Conservative Party politician.

== Life ==
Morgan was the son of David Thomas Morgan of Whipps Cross, Walthamstow, Essex, and his wife Mary née Ridge. Born at the White House, High Road, Leytonstone, he was educated at Forest School, Walthamstow from 1853 to 1860 and at Vevey in Switzerland.

Morgan was a member of The Football Association at their fifth meeting on 1 December 1863, representing Forest School.

He entered business in the City of London, where he was a Russian merchant and member of the firm of Morgan, Gellibrand and Company. He was also a director of the Surrey Commercial Dock Company and of the Northampton Brewery Company. In 1867 he married Emily Bigland of Etloe House, Leyton.

Morgan entered politics when he was elected to the first Essex County Council formed in 1889, being returned as Conservative councillor for Leytonstone in a hard-fought contest. He later became councillor for Brentwood, having made his home at Bentley Mill near the town.

In 1900 he was selected as the Conservative and Unionist candidate to contest the South Western or Walthamstow Division of Essex. The seat was held by Sam Woods, elected as a Liberal-Labour Member of Parliament at a by-election in 1897.

The election was held at the height of the Second Boer War, and Morgan benefitted from the fact that he supported the government's policy, while Woods had abstained on a vote in the Commons supporting the war. Morgan won the seat by a large majority, and the gain of the seat was seen as one of the most significant government successes in the "khaki election".

Morgan only served one term in parliament, and did not contest the next general election in 1906 on medical advice.

Morgan was Master of the Worshipful Company of Bowyers of the City of London from 1902 to 1904.

Parliament of the United Kingdom
| Preceded by Sam Woods | Member of Parliament for Walthamstow; 1900–1906 | Succeeded by John Allsebrook Simon |
