= 1957 Bristol West by-election =

UK parliamentary by-election

The 1957 Bristol West by-election of 7 March 1957 was a by-election to the UK House of Commons which saw the constituency of Bristol West elect a new Conservative Party Member of Parliament to replace Walter Monckton. Sir Walter had first been elected at a previous byelection in 1951.

== Candidates ==
The Conservative Party chose Robert Cooke, a schoolteacher who was only 26 years old. Cooke had been President of the Oxford University Conservative Association in 1953, and was elected to Bristol City Council the next year; he had been the Conservative candidate for Bristol South East in the 1955 general election.

The Labour Party chose William Rodgers, then General Secretary of the Fabian Society, who was 28 at the time. There was no Liberal Party candidate.

== Result ==
Robert Cooke kept the seat in the Conservative column but suffered a substantial reduction in the majority, which fell from 22,001 to 14,162. Labour retained almost all of their 1955 vote. Cooke became the "Baby of the House" (youngest member), and kept the seat until he retired at the 1979 general election. William Rodgers was not disillusioned and later became Labour Member of Parliament for Stockton-on-Tees in a 1962 byelection.

Bristol West by-election, 1957
Party	Candidate	Votes	%	±%
Conservative	Robert Cooke	24,585	70.2	−5.1
Labour	William Rodgers	10,423	29.8	+5.1
Majority		14,162	40.4	−10.2
Turnout		35,008	61.1	−13.5
Conservative hold		Swing	-5.1	

== See also ==
- List of United Kingdom by-elections (1950–1979)
