= Frank Cook (politician) =

British politician (1935–2012)

- Cook in 2005

Member of Parliament for Stockton North
- In office 9 June 1983 – 12 April 2010
- Preceded by: Constituency created
- Succeeded by: Alex Cunningham

Personal details
- Born: Francis Cook; 3 November 1935 Hartlepool, England
- Died: 10 January 2012 (aged 76) Stockton-on-Tees, England
- Party: Independent
- Other political affiliations: Labour
- Spouses: Patricia Lundrigan (m. 1959, divorced) Princess Somsangouane Baldinger (before 2008)
- Children: 4 (by Lundrigan)
- Education: Institute of Education, Leeds
- Website: Official website

Francis Cook (3 November 1935 – 10 January 2012) was a British Labour and later independent politician who served as Member of Parliament (MP) for Stockton North from 1983 until 2010.

== Background ==
Cook was born in West Hartlepool and was educated at the Corby School (Sunderland), the De la Salle College (Manchester) and the Institute of Education (Leeds). Before his election to the Commons, Cook worked variously as a gravedigger, a Butlins Redcoat, a transport manager at a steelworks, a teacher, and a construction planning engineer.

== Parliament ==
He was selected to contest Stockton North at the 1983 general election, securing the nomination following the defection of the sitting Labour MP Bill Rodgers who was one of the original Gang of Four who set up the Social Democratic Party in 1981. Cook won the seat with a majority of 1,870, with Rodgers finishing in third place behind the Conservative candidate.

He served as Opposition whip under Neil Kinnock from 1987 to 1992. He was a member of the Speaker's Panel of Chairmen in the 2005–10 parliament. He was a leading opponent of gun control following the Dunblane massacre in 1996. It was reported that he once asked Conservative MP Andrew MacKay to "step outside for a fight".

In the 2005 political year, the Public Whip found Cook to be the 38th most rebellious MP (out of 635). He had recently become known for his dissent concerning the controversial ID Cards and Racial and Religious Hatred Bill. He had the large former ICI site at Billingham in his constituency and was a supporter of Hartlepool FC.

=== 2010 general election ===
In January 2008, Cook (a member of the Socialist Campaign Group) was de-selected by his local constituency Labour Party when choosing its candidate for the next general election in favour of Alex Cunningham. In April 2010 he announced that he would stand as an independent in the general election. In the 2010 general election, he stood as an independent, coming in fifth behind Cunningham (Labour 16,923; 42.8%), Ian Galletley (Conservative 10,247; 25.9%), Philip Latham (Liberal Democrat 6,342; 16.1%), and James MacPherson (British National Party 1,724; 4.4%). Cook received 1,577 votes, 4.0%, and lost his deposit.

=== £5 expense claim ===
In May 2009, The Daily Telegraph revealed he had tried to reclaim, as an expense, the £5 that an assistant had donated during a service at Stockton Parish Church to commemorate the Battle of Britain. The Fees Office rejected his claim. Cook said that he had made the claim by mistake after reimbursing his assistant, and subsequently sued the newspaper for libel. He lost the case when the Telegraph submitted a defence of fair comment, and Cook could not prove malice.

== Personal life ==
Cook married Patricia Lundrigan in 1959; the couple had three daughters and a son. He was still married to his first wife, Patricia, when he met Princess Somsangouane Baldinger of the Lao royal family at the 1992 Billingham folklore festival. He and Lundrigan divorced, and he remarried to Baldinger.

In an interview in 2008 with the Evening Gazette, he said his second wife was "almost too perfect"; "She's a wonderful artist and a lady of considerable skill and merit ... Do you know, she's never made me the same meal twice since we met."

In May 2025 his great-granddaughter Bella Culley was arrested on drug smuggling charges in Tbilisi, Georgia.

In January 2026 newly released de-classified Cold War documents showed that Cook had been a spy for Czechoslovakia.

== Death ==
Cook was diagnosed with lung cancer in early 2011 and died aged 76 at North Tees Hospital, Stockton, on 10 January 2012.

Parliament of the United Kingdom
New constituency	Member of Parliament for Stockton North; 1983–2010	Succeeded by Alex Cunningham
