= Chris McDonald (politician) =

British politician (born 1970s)

Chris McDonald MP FREng FRGS FIMMM FIChemE
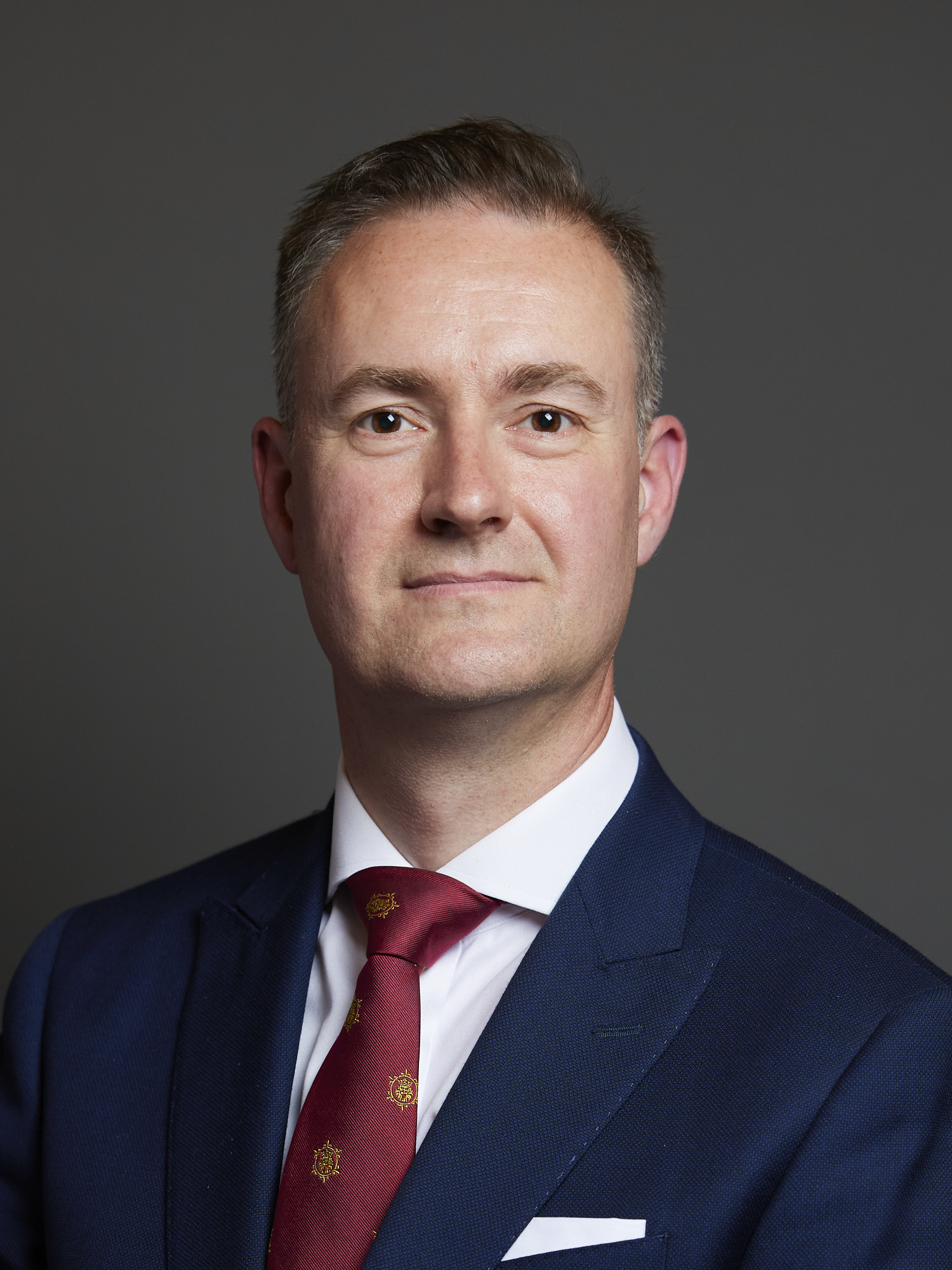
- Official portrait, 2024

Minister of State for Science, Innovation and Investment
- Incumbent
- Assumed office 21 July 2026
- Prime Minister: Andy Burnham
- Preceded by: The Lord Vallance of Balham (as Science and Innovation Minister); The Lord Stockwood (as Investment Minister)

Parliamentary Under-Secretary of State for Industry
- In office 11 September 2025 – 21 July 2026
- Prime Minister: Keir Starmer
- Preceded by: Sarah Jones
- Succeeded by: Blair McDougall

Member of Parliament for Stockton North
- Incumbent
- Assumed office 4 July 2024
- Preceded by: Alex Cunningham
- Majority: 7,939 (21.2%)

Personal details
- Born: 1976 or 1977 (age 49–50) Hartlepool, County Durham, England
- Party: Labour
- Education: Churchill College, Cambridge (BA, MEng); University of Warwick (MBA)
- Website: Official website

Chris McDonald (born 1976 or 1977) is a British Labour Party politician, chemical engineer and former business executive, who has been Member of Parliament (MP) for Stockton North since 2024.

Between 2014 and 2024, McDonald was the CEO of the Materials Processing Institute, after leading its divestment from Tata Steel.

== Early life and education ==
Chris McDonald was born in Hartlepool, and grew up in Blackhall. He first worked at British Steel before they sponsored him to read chemical engineering at Churchill College, Cambridge, where he graduated with BA and MEng degrees in 2000. He thereafter read for a Master of Business Administration (MBA) degree at the University of Warwick.

== Industrial career ==
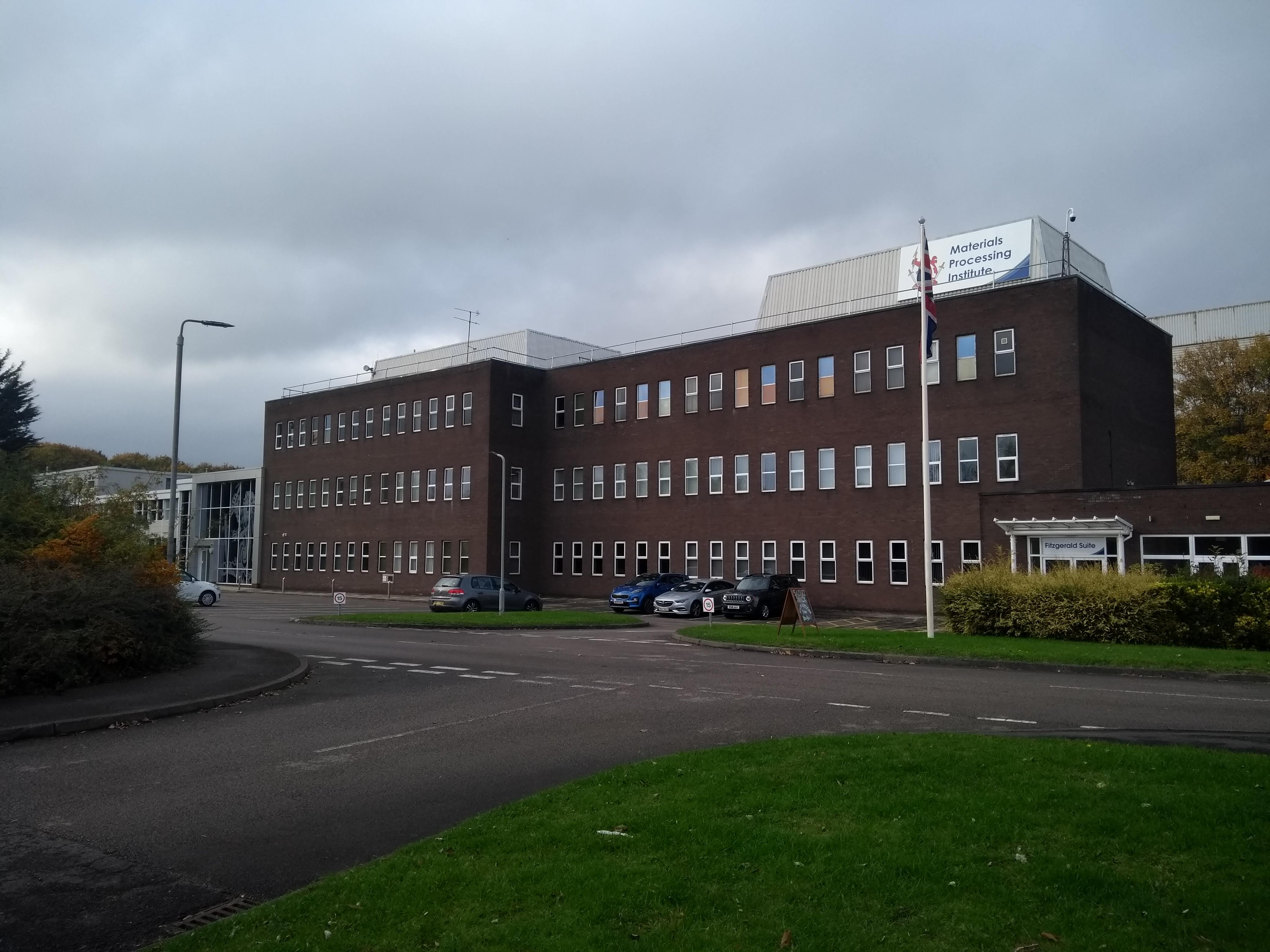
McDonald led the divestment of Materials Processing Institute (pictured in 2022), and was its CEO from 2014–2024

Upon graduation, McDonald worked in various roles in the steel industry, but focused on research.

In 2008, McDonald became a laboratory manager within the research division of Tata Steel.

In 2014, McDonald led the divestment of Tata Steel UK's research and development centre in Grangetown, which would form the independent Materials Processing Institute, becoming its CEO. In 2016, he launched the Institute's commercial steel-making operation from its facility on Teesside.

In 2018, McDonald appeared on BBC Radio 4 Today, to discuss the future of the British steel industry. As CEO of the Materials Processing Institute, McDonald helped secure a £3 million investment from the Tees Valley Growth Deal to build the Institute's SME Technology Centre. He has also overseen the development of a doctoral academy at the Institute, "The Millman Scholarships". He also, jointly with the Institution of Chemical Engineers, launched a fellowship in the memory of chemical engineer and MP Ashok Kumar, who died in 2010.

He is a fellow of the Institution of Chemical Engineers, the Institute of Materials, Minerals and Mining, the Royal Geographical Society, and Royal Academy of Engineering.

== Politics ==
In March 2023, McDonald was selected as parliamentary candidate for Labour in the 2024 election for the constituency of Stockton North, to replace Alex Cunningham, who had announced he was standing down. On being selected, he said his two main priorities were "creating opportunities for young people" and transitioning industry, particularly in Billingham, "to [a] green industry" At the election he came first with a majority of 7,939 over second place Reform. In July, McDonald was made a parliamentary private secretary in the Department for Energy Security and Net Zero. In the 2025 British cabinet reshuffle, he joined the government as parliamentary under-secretary of state in the Department for Energy Security and Net Zero and the parliamentary under-secretary of state in the Department for Business and Trade.

As an MP he has advocated for residents of newbuild estates for which the developer has not finished the necessary infrastructure, such as roads, and has called for the government to take action in the area.

In July 2026, he was appointed to the new government as Minister of State at the Department for Business, Innovation, Science and Trade and Department of Health and Social Care jointly, by Andy Burnham.

== Personal life ==
McDonald plays the cornet in a brass band.

Parliament of the United Kingdom
Preceded by Alex Cunningham	Member of Parliament for Stockton North; 2024–present	Incumbent
