= Joseph Dodds =

Joseph Dodds can refer to:

- Joseph Dodds (British politician), 1819-1891
- Joe Dodds (Scottish footballer), 1887-1965
