= Silvia Rodgers =

German-British writer (1928–2006)

The Right Honourable The Lady Rodgers of Quarry Bank FRSL
- Born: Silvia Szulman; 3 March 1928
- Died: 8 October 2006 (aged 78)
- Occupation(s): Political activist and hostess; writer; anthropologist; dentist; sculptor
- Notable work: Red Saint, Pink Daughter

Silvia Rodgers, Baroness Rodgers of Quarry Bank, FRSL (née Szulman; 3 March 1928 – 8 October 2006), was a German-British writer and political activist. She was married to the politician Bill Rodgers.

== Early life ==
Rodgers was born in Wedding (Berlin) to working-class Jewish parents. Her parents were members of the Communist Party of Germany. Her mother insisted that Silvia not participate in the Nazi salute at school. In an afterword to her memoir, Rodgers wrote "When I was ten and still in Berlin, I had that feeling that there was nothing I could not do".

The family came to Britain in 1939.

== Marriage and political involvement ==
Silvia Szulman and Bill Rodgers married in 1955. The couple had three daughters: Rachel, Lucy and Juliet.

Rodgers influenced her husband's political career, particularly his decision to leave the Labour Party and set up the Social Democratic Party. Bill Rodgers said that most of the child-rearing fell to Silvia and that he was neglectful; she also worked as a dentist when he was first in parliament as they were not well-off. She was noted as a political hostess. Rodgers described herself as feeling like an outsider, dislocated and marginal.

== Artistic career ==
Rodgers was a sculptor.

== Research and writing ==
Rodgers completed a PhD in anthropology at Oxford, on the subject of the rituals of ship-launching: The symbolism of ship launching in the Royal Navy (1983).

She was a Fellow of the Royal Society of Literature.

Her writings include:

- "Women's space in a men's house: the British House of Commons" (1981), in Women and Space: Ground Rules and Social Maps, ed. Ardener, S
- A memoir, Red Saint, Pink Daughter: a communist childhood in Berlin and London (1996), joint winner of the Jewish Quarterly-Wingate Prize for Non-Fiction (1997)
- The Politician's Wife: life with Bill Rodgers (2007)
