= Bertrand Watson =

Bertrand Watson

Sir John Bertrand Watson (16 May 1878 – 16 February 1948) was an English lawyer, Chief Metropolitan Magistrate and Liberal Party politician.

== Family and education ==
Watson was born in Stockton-on-Tees, the son of John Wilson Watson, JP, a timber merchant from Stockton. He was educated at Harrogate College. In 1909, he married Ethelwynne Gladys Jameson, also from Stockton and they had two sons and two daughters.

== Career ==
Watson studied the law and was admitted as a solicitor in 1900, passing his final examination with honours. From 1902 to 1911 he served as Deputy Coroner for County Durham. In 1919 he was called to the Bar by Gray's Inn and was later a Bencher. When he was first appointed a magistrate in 1928 he sat at the North London Court. In 1931 he was transferred to Clerkenwell where he stayed until 1936 when he resigned through ill-health, having suffered a series of heart attacks. In 1938 he was well enough to be re-instated and he was appointed to sit at Lambeth Court and then from 1941 onwards at Bow Street.

Later in 1941, on the death of the sitting Chief Magistrate, Sir Robert Dummett, Watson was appointed to succeed him. Among the cases he presided over was the committal for trial for treason of William Joyce, Lord Haw-Haw in 1945.

== Politics ==
Watson had a career in local government as a member of Durham County Council from 1912 to 1919 and on Stockton Town Council, of which he was Mayor in 1915–1916. In 1917, the town's sitting Liberal MP died and Watson was chosen as the candidate for the resulting by-election. He easily held the seat as a Coalition Liberal. At the 1918 general election Watson was returned unopposed as a Coalition Liberal. At the 1922 general election he faced a three-cornered contest against a Labour candidate Frederick Fox Riley (later MP for Stockton-on-Tees from 1929 to 1931) and an Independent Liberal, Robert Strother Stewart, a supporter of H H Asquith. He held his seat beating Riley by a majority of 1,213 votes. However he chose not to stand at the 1923 general election when Stewart won the seat, beating future Conservative Prime Minister Harold Macmillan.

== Appointments ==
Watson was briefly Parliamentary Private Secretary to the Rt Hon. Edward Shortt, KC, MP when he was Home Secretary in 1919.

== Death ==
Watson died in harness as Chief Metropolitan Magistrate. He collapsed and died half an hour after the luncheon adjournment at Bow Street on 16 February 1948 at the age of 69 years.

Parliament of the United Kingdom
Preceded by Jonathan Samuel	Member of Parliament for Stockton-on-Tees; 1917–1923	Succeeded by Robert Strother Stewart
