= Robert Ropner =

British politician

Sir Robert Ropner Bt MP VD JP

High Sheriff of Durham
- In office 1896
- Preceded by: Sir Hugh Bell, 2nd Baronet
- Succeeded by: Colonel Lancelot Allgood Gregson

Member of Parliament for Stockton-on-Tees
- In office 24 October 1900 – 21 December 1909
- Preceded by: Jonathan Samuel
- Succeeded by: Jonathan Samuel

Personal details
- Born: Emil Hugo Oscar Robert Röpner; 16 December 1838 Magdeburg, Province of Saxony, Kingdom of Prussia
- Died: 26 February 1924 (aged 85)
- Occupation: Shipbuilder; shipowner; Conservative Party politician

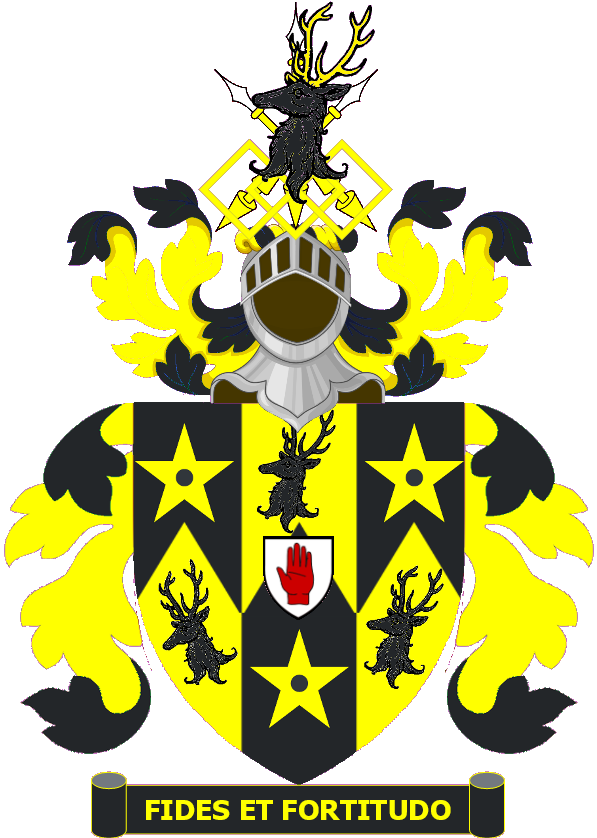
Armorial achievement

Sir Emil Hugo Oscar Robert Ropner, 1st Baronet (born Röpner; 16 December 1838 – 26 February 1924) was a German-British shipbuilder, shipowner, and Conservative Member of Parliament.

== Career ==
Ropner was born in 1838 in Magdeburg, Province of Saxony, Kingdom of Prussia, the son of Johann Heinrich Röpner and Johanne Christiane Emilie Bessel. He emigrated to England and worked for a coal export concern before building up a fleet of colliers and founding the Ropner Shipping Company in Hartlepool in 1874.

In 1888, Robert Ropner acquired a shipyard at Stockton-on-Tees in County Durham. Ropner established a successful shipbuilding firm, which built many trunk deck ships. No longer limited to hauling coal, Ropner also established a company to operate tramp steamers. Although the shipyard went into liquidation soon after what was then known as the Great War, the shipping company continued to operate through both World Wars, despite heavy wartime losses of vessels.

Robert Ropner served as High Sheriff of Durham in 1896 and from 1900 to 1910 represented the constituency of Stockton-on-Tees in the House of Commons. He was President of the UK Chamber of Shipping for 1902.

He was made a Knight Bachelor in the 1902 Birthday Honours and knighted by King Edward VII at Buckingham Palace on 18 December 1902. He was created Baronet of Preston Hall, Stockton-on-Tees, in the County Palatine of Durham, and of Skutterskelfe Hall, Hutton Rudby, in the North Riding of York on 20 August 1904.

Ropner died on 26 February 1924, at the age of 85, and was succeeded in the baronetcy by his eldest son John. His third son William Ropner was the father of the Conservative politician Sir Leonard Ropner, 1st Baronet of Thorp Perrow.

Coat of arms of Robert Ropner

Crest
Upon three mascles interlaced fessways and in front as many tilting spears one in pale and two In saltire Or a stag’s head erased Sable attired Gold.
Escutcheon
Per fess dancetty Sable and Or a pale counterchanged three mullets pierced two and one as many stags' heads erased one and two all also counterchanged.
Motto
Fides Et Fortitudo (Latin: Faith and Fortitude)

Parliament of the United Kingdom
Preceded by Jonathan Samuel	Member of Parliament for Stockton-on-Tees; 1900 – January 1910	Succeeded by Jonathan Samuel
Baronetage of the United Kingdom
New creation	Baronet (of Preston Hall and Skutterskelfe Hall); 1904–1924	Succeeded by John Henry Ropner
