= George Chetwynd =

British politician

Sir George Chetwynd CBE
- Born: May 14, 1916
- Died: September 2, 1982 (aged 66)
- Education: Queen Elizabeth's Grammar School, Atherstone, King's College London (B.A. Hons., Postgraduate scholarship)
- Occupations: Lecturer, Politician, Public servant
- Known for: Director of the North East Development Council (1962–1967)
- Term: 1945–1962 (as MP)
- Political party: Labour
- Awards: Commander of the Order of the British Empire (CBE), Knight Bachelor

Sir George Roland Chetwynd, CBE (14 May 1916 – 2 September 1982) was a British lecturer, politician and public servant. He defeated Harold Macmillan to get elected as a member of parliament, but later left Parliament to become Director of the North East Development Council for five years in the 1960s.

== Education ==
Chetwynd was the son of a miner, and was brought up in north Warwickshire. An academically gifted child, he passed the Eleven plus and attended Queen Elizabeth's Grammar School in Atherstone; he then won a place at King's College London where he obtained a BA (Hons.) in History and a postgraduate scholarship in the same subject. He joined the Labour Party in 1936 and earned a living by being a lecturer for the Workers Educational Association.

== Wartime service ==
In 1940, during the Second World War, Chetwynd enlisted in the Royal Artillery. Two years later he was commissioned into the Royal Army Educational Corps where he trained troops; by the end of the war he held the rank of captain. At the 1945 general election, Chetwynd fought Stockton-on-Tees as the Labour Party candidate against the rising Conservative minister Harold Macmillan; in one of the first results to be declared, he won with a majority of 8,664.

== Parliament ==
He made his mark in Parliament as a generally loyal supporter of the government, which was put under pressure from the left. He saw nothing inconsistent in membership of the United Nations while retaining strong armed forces for the United Kingdom. Although initially opposed to the continuation of national service in peacetime, he later came round to support it. He also spoke in favour of the Town and Country Planning Bill in 1947. In March of that year he appealed for greater efforts to build new factories on Tees-side. In March 1948 he signed an all party motion calling for a 'Council of Western Europe' to prepare the way for an organic federation of European states. Chetwynd was approached to sign a telegram to Pietro Nenni, a Communist-allied Italian socialist, but refused to have anything to do with it.

== Alliance with Hugh Dalton ==
With Chetwynd being particularly close to Hugh Dalton, when Dalton returned to government in May 1948 he chose Chetwynd as his Parliamentary Private Secretary. He was a strong supporter of nationalisation of the steel industry, which was a major employer in his constituency. He retained his seat through the 1950 and 1951 general elections, and made an easy transition into opposition after 1951.

== Opposition politics ==
His interest in European co-operation was marked by appointment as a delegate to the consultative assembly of the Council of Europe from 1952 to 1954. He was also a Governor of Queen Mary's Hospital, Roehampton and was Chair of the Governors in 1952. He was also a supporter of walking in the countryside (and went rambling with Hugh Dalton); he was a member of Nature Conservancy. In 1953, Chetwynd seconded a Private member's bill brought in by Samuel Viant which banned the sale of toy weapons; he argued that possession of these weapons "was a real incentive to development of the gangster mentality".

In the late 1950s Chetwynd became more concerned with economic development in his constituency. He sponsored a private member's bill in 1957 to make Stockton-on-Tees into a County borough, but was defeated by 201 to 95. He was also concerned over problems with nuclear power stations, although supportive of nuclear power and nuclear weapons generally. He opposed government spending on space research, regarding it as "an attempt to keep up with the Joneses".

== North East development ==
After the 1959 general election, Chetwynd was made an opposition spokesman on Aviation. He pressed for investment in the aviation industry, including the construction of a supersonic airliner. However, in late 1961 he was applied for and was offered the job of Director of the North East Development Council, giving him responsibility for selling the region to overseas investors. Chetwynd resigned his seat and took up the appointment in January 1962.

Shortly after his appointment Chetwynd began to 'sell' the North East region by giving a press conference for American firms where he argued that France was too politically unstable and West Germany had a labour shortage. Later that year, his annual report complained that the north east had received fewer government grants for industrial development than other regions. He objected to the London-centric economy of the United Kingdom and called for better transport infrastructure to redress it. The North East Development Council made several attempts to get a personal meeting with Harold Macmillan, then Prime Minister, in 1963. He often complained about the poor public image of the north-east.

== Other public roles ==
From 1964, Chetwynd began to receive other public appointments, first as a member of the General Advisory Council of the Independent Television Authority and of the North-East Advisory Committee for Civil Aviation. He was put on the Northern Economic Planning Council in the same year. Chetwynd's interest in aviation was also used on the board of the British Overseas Airways Corporation from 1966 to 1974. In 1968 he was awarded the Freedom of the Borough of Stockton-on-Tees.

== Business appointments ==
Chetwynd left the North East Development Council in February 1967 to become Deputy Chairman of the Land Commission. This appointment was part-time and allowed him to increase his business involvement: he was a Director of the Northern and Tubes Group of British Steel Corporation from 1968 and a board member of the whole British Steel Corporation group from 1970. He was Chairman of the Land Commission from 1970, an appointment intended to be for three years but actually lasted only one: the incoming Conservative Government wound up the Land Commission in 1971.

A Director of the Northern Industrial Development Board from 1972, Chetwynd decreased his involvement as the 1970s went on. He moved onto the Northern Regional Health Authority as vice-chairman from 1973 to 1976, and as chairman from 1978. He was also Chairman of the Council of BBC Radio Cleveland from 1976 to 1978. He was given a Knighthood in the 1982 Birthday Honours list. He was replaced as Chairman of the Northern Regional Health Authority in June 1982 by Norman Fowler shortly after criticising the Conservative government's conduct of a pay dispute, although this was said to have been a coincidence.

Parliament of the United Kingdom
Preceded by Harold Macmillan	Member of Parliament for Stockton-on-Tees; 1945–1962	Succeeded by Bill Rodgers
