= 1917 Stockton-on-Tees by-election =

UK parliamentary by-election

The 1917 Stockton-on-Tees by-election was a parliamentary by-election held for the British House of Commons constituency of Stockton-on-Tees in County Durham on 20 March 1917.

== Vacancy ==
The by-election was caused by the death of the sitting Liberal MP, Jonathan Samuel on 22 February 1917.

== Candidates ==
The Stockton Liberal Association considered a number of possible candidates but decided upon Bertrand Watson, a 38-year-old local man, a solicitor who was a former Mayor of Stockton-on-Tees and member of Durham County Council. The Unionists had indicated that they would not oppose a Liberal candidate who supported the wartime Coalition government of which they were members. The Labour Party in Stockton considered putting up a candidate. They invited Robert Dennison, a Trade Union official with the British Steel Smelters' Association, to address them with a view to becoming their candidate but in the end decided not to put forward a challenge to the wartime party truce. Dennison did later go on to become Labour MP for Birmingham King's Norton from 1924-1929. The by-election was however contested by banker Edward Backhouse JP of Darlington, a proponent of the Peace by Negotiation Party and a member of the Society of Friends.

== The issues ==
The by-election was described in the press as quiet and lacking outward signs of public interest. The prosecution of the war was the only issue of the day and Backhouse failed to capture the public imagination with many local men away serving in the armed forces. He often faced a hostile reception. One of his meetings was broken up by an angry crowd which stormed the platform preventing his guest from speaking.

== Result ==
Watson easily held the seat for the Liberals and the Coalition, the pacifist candidate polling even less well than anticipated.

1917 Stockton-on-Tees by-election
Party	Candidate	Votes	%	±%
Liberal	Bertrand Watson	7,641	92.8	+39.6
Independent	Edward Backhouse	596	7.2	New
Majority		7,045	85.6	+79.2
Turnout		8,237	59.3	−30.1
Liberal hold		Swing		

== See also ==
- List of United Kingdom by-elections
- United Kingdom by-election records
