= Jonathan Samuel =

Jonathan Samuel

Jonathan Samuel (28 February 1853 – 22 February 1917) was a British manufacturer and Liberal Party politician.

== Family ==
Jonathan Samuel was the son of Thomas Samuel of Tredegar, Monmouthshire and his wife Jane Clara (née Davies). In 1892, he married Hannah Exley the daughter of Joshua Mellor from Huddersfield. They had four daughters.

== Career and politics ==
Samuel made his living in manufacturing. He was active in local politics in Stockton-on-Tees being Mayor of the town in 1894–95 and again in 1902. From 1910 until his death in 1917 he was an Alderman of Durham County Council and a member of the Tees Conservancy Board. He also served as a justice of the peace for Stockton-on-Tees from 1893.

He was first elected to the House of Commons at the 1895 general election when he defeated the sitting Unionist MP, Thomas Wrightson at Stockton-on-Tees. However he lost the seat back to the Tories in 1900. He did not fight Stockton at the 1906 general election when despite the Liberal landslide in the country, Stockton remained in Conservative hands.

However, he did contest the constituency again in January 1910 when he re-gained it from the Conservatives with a majority of 1,113. He held the seat at the general election of December 1910 but his majority fell to 670 votes.

Parliament of the United Kingdom
Preceded by Thomas Wrightson	Member of Parliament for Stockton-on-Tees; 1895–1900	Succeeded by Robert Ropner
Preceded by Robert Ropner	Member of Parliament for Stockton-on-Tees; January 1910 – 1917	Succeeded by Bertrand Watson
