= Robert Strother Stewart =

Robert Strother Stewart (16 May 1878 – 15 November 1954) was an English lawyer, colonial judge and Liberal Party politician.

== Family and education ==
Stewart was the son of the Reverend Robert Stewart MA, a Presbyterian minister from Newcastle upon Tyne. He was educated privately and then attended the University of Durham where he was a member of both Hatfield and Armstrong colleges. He gained MA, B.Litt and Bachelor of Civil Law degrees. He was a Gladstone Prizeman of the University and President of the Union. He also attended Westminster College, Cambridge, the theological college for the Presbyterian Church. In 1913 he married Ida Lillie Taylor and they had two sons.

== Career ==
=== United Kingdom ===
Stewart went in for the law. He was admitted as a solicitor in 1905. He later qualified as a barrister, was called to the Bar at the Inner Temple in 1919 and practised on the North-Eastern Circuit. In 1945 he became one of the Chairmen of the Pensions Appeal Tribunals under the Pensions Tribunals Act, 1943. The Tribunals considered claims for pensions by members of the armed services and war-injured civilians and their families.

=== Colonial service ===
From the mid-1920s Stewart took up appointments in the Colonial Legal Service. He was a magistrate, Judge of Petty Civil Court and Coroner of the County of Victoria in Trinidad from 1927–1929. He served as Assistant Legal Adviser at the Colonial Office, 1929–30 and as Legal Adviser to the Governor of Malta, 1930–33. From July–August 1932 he briefly held the rank of Deputy Governor of Malta. He was a member of the Nominated and Privy Councils of Malta and Examiner in English Literature and History in the University of Malta. In 1933 he was appointed Puisne Judge of the Supreme Court of the Gold Coast Colony and held the post until 1942. Stewart also served as a Member of the West African Court of Appeal and was Acting Chief Justice of Gold Coast Colony on various occasions.

== Volunteer soldier ==
In 1913, Stewart received a commission in the Tynemouth Royal Garrison Artillery, Territorial Force. He was Assistant to the Competent Military Authority, Tyne Garrison from 1919–20, earning a mention for valuable services. He achieved the rank of Major in the Royal Artillery, serving in the Reserve from 1921–1928.

== Politics ==
=== Local politics ===
Stewart was elected as a member of the Newcastle Board of Guardians in 1909 and served until 1912. In that year he was elected to Newcastle City Council and later became a member of the Education Committee. He stayed on the council until 1924.

=== Workington ===
Stewart first stood for Parliament at the 1918 general election as Liberal candidate for the Workington Division of Cumberland. He was one of those candidates who was awarded the Coalition Coupon but repudiated it. He stated that while he had supported the coalition government during the war, he did not want to commit himself to supporting it on every issue after the war. This did him little good, for whereas the Coalition won a great victory in 1918, Stewart made no real impression at Workington. The seat was won for Labour by the secretary of the Cumberland Miners' Association, Thomas Cape. The Unionist Lt Col D J Mason was second, Stewart finished third with an Independent candidate at the bottom of the poll.

=== Stockton-on-Tees ===
For the 1922 general election Stewart switched seats to contest Stockton-on-Tees in County Durham. In a three-cornered fight the seat was held by the sitting Coalition Liberal MP, John Bertrand Watson, who this time stood under the description National Liberal – that is as a supporter of the outgoing Prime Minister David Lloyd George. Stewart came third in a three-cornered fight behind Watson and Labour's Frederick Fox Riley, who was to win the seat at the 1929 election.

In 1923, Stewart fought Stockton again. Watson having stood down, Stewart now faced a Conservative candidate, Harold Macmillan, the future Prime Minister, with Riley again representing Labour. In a close three-way fight Stewart just beat Macmillan by a majority of 73 votes, with Riley only about 1,000 votes behind.

By 1924 however the Conservative Party had revived and British politics was reverting to a two-party system, with Labour replacing the Liberals as the main force on the left. The Liberals saw a huge decline of support, particularly in industrial and urban seats. This pattern was repeated in Stockton. Macmillan recounted in his memoirs how moderate Liberals and some Conservatives who had voted Liberal in 1923 on the ground that Stewart was the most likely candidate to keep Labour out, were now coming over to him and how, as the days progressed, it became more and more clear it was a straight fight between him and Labour. Macmillan took the seat with 42% of the poll and a majority of 3,215 over Riley. Stewart came bottom of the poll with 25% of the votes.

Stewart did not stand for re-election to the House of Commons again.

== Other interests ==
Stewart listed his recreations as music, acting and stamp collecting but he clearly had a penchant for football too. He was a director of Newcastle United F.C. from 1915–1927.

== Death ==
Stewart died at his home in Archbold Terrace, Newcastle upon Tyne on 15 November 1954 aged 76 years.

Parliament of the United Kingdom
Preceded by Bertrand Watson	Member of Parliament for Stockton-on-Tees; 1923–1924	Succeeded by Harold Macmillan
