= Robert Cooke (Conservative politician) =

British politician

Sir Robert Gordon Cooke (29 May 1930 – 6 January 1987) was a British Conservative Party politician.

== Early life ==
Cooke was born in Cardiff to Walter R. Cooke and Maud Cowie.

Cooke was educated at The Downs School in Wraxall, Somerset, Harrow School and Christ Church, Oxford.

== Career ==
He served as a councillor on Bristol City Council 1954–57 and was a teacher of English at a Bristol public school.

While a councillor and teacher, Cooke contested Bristol South East in 1955. He was Member of Parliament for Bristol West from a 1957 by-election until 1979. He introduced the Fatal Accidents Act 1959, the direct forerunner to the Fatal Accidents Act 1976 which provides for investigation and compensation in cases of work-related deaths. He was knighted in the 1979 Birthday Honours. Cooke died in January 1987 at the age of 56 of motor neurone disease.

== Film location owner ==
He was the owner of Athelhampton House in Dorset, location of the 1972 film Sleuth, starring Michael Caine and Laurence Olivier, as well as the 1976 Doctor Who serial The Seeds of Doom.

Parliament of the United Kingdom
Preceded by Walter Monckton	Member of Parliament for Bristol West; 1957–1979	Succeeded by William Waldegrave
Honorary titles
Preceded by Marcus Kimball	Baby of the House; 1957–1958	Succeeded by Basil de Ferranti
