= Stockton North =

UK Parliament constituency (since 1983)

Coordinates: 54.60°N 1.30°W

- County constituency for the House of Commons
- Interactive map of boundaries since 2024
- Location within North East England
- County: County Durham
- Electorate: 70,242 (2024)
- Major settlements: Stockton-on-Tees, Billingham, Wolviston, Port Clarence and Thorpe Thewles

Current constituency
- Created: 1983
- Member of Parliament: Chris McDonald (Labour)
- Seats: One
- Created from: Stockton-on-Tees

Stockton North is a constituency (Note: A borough constituency (for the purposes of election expenses and type of returning officer)) covering the town of Stockton-on-Tees in County Durham and other nearby settlements in the Borough of Stockton-on-Tees located north of the River Tees, represented in the House of Commons of the UK Parliament by Chris McDonald, a member of the Labour Party, having been elected in the 2024 general election.

== Constituency profile ==
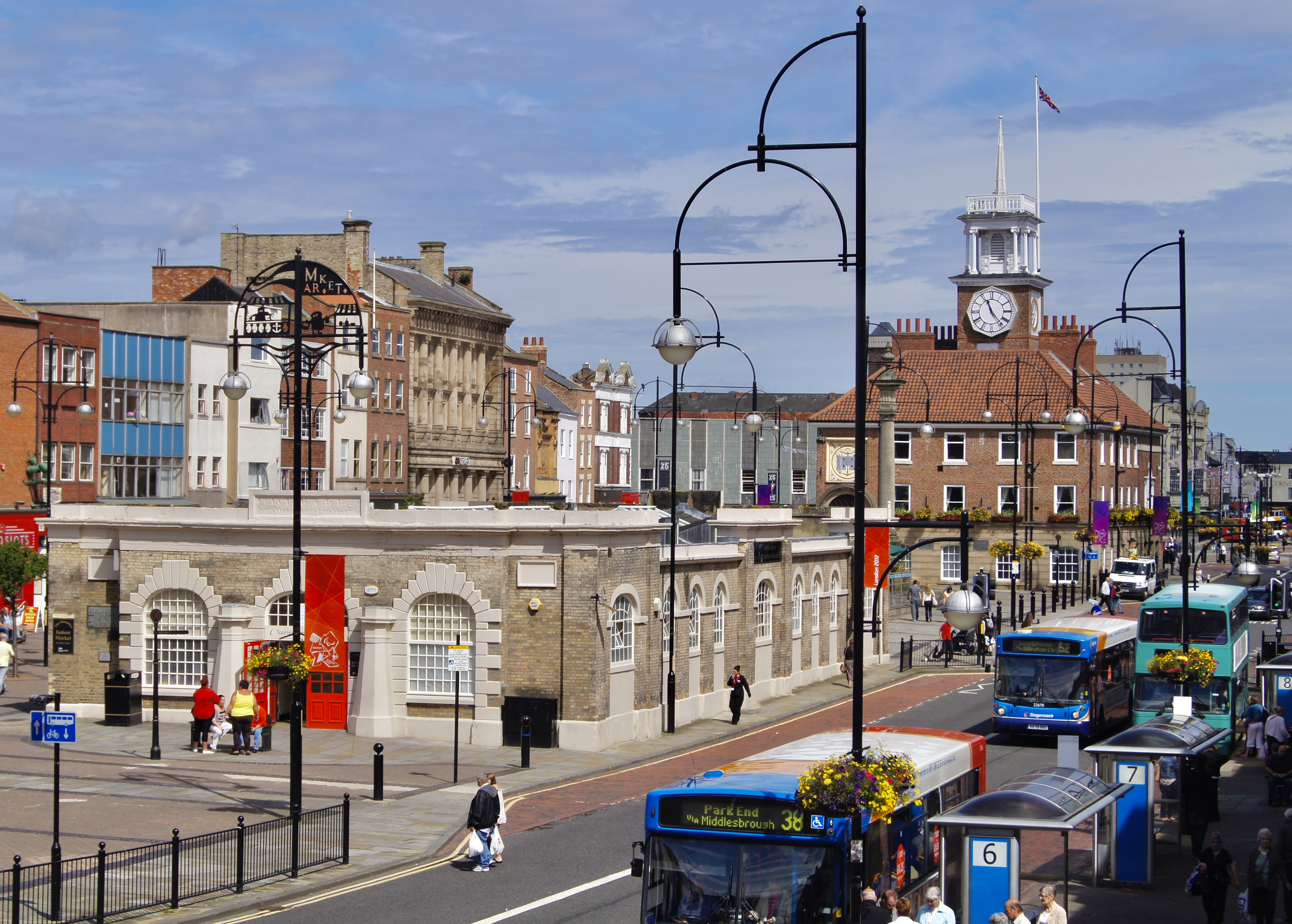
Stockton-on-Tees

Stockton North is a constituency in County Durham in North East England. It covers the central and northern areas of the town of Stockton-on-Tees, including Oxbridge, Portrack and Hardwick, as well as the adjacent towns of Norton and Billingham and parts of the outlying village of Wynyard.

Stockton is a large town within the Teesside urban area, located close to Middlesbrough and Thornaby-on-Tees. Stockton is traditionally a market town that experienced rapid growth during the Industrial Revolution as a centre for shipbuilding, ironmaking and engineering. The Stockton and Darlington Railway, the world's first steam-powered passenger railway, was built and opened here by George Stephenson in 1825. This constituency was heavily industrial; Haverton Hill was mostly depopulated in the 1960s due to pollution, and the area around Seal Sands still contains large chemical production facilities. Most of Stockton is highly-deprived with many residents living in socially-rented housing. Norton and Billingham are wealthier and more suburban in character, and Wynyard is an affluent, newly-developed garden village. House prices across the constituency are generally lower than the rest of North East England and the average price is less than half the UK average.

Residents of Stockton North have a similar age profile to the rest of the country. They have low rates of income, average levels of homeownership, and the child poverty rate is high; in November 2023, home secretary James Cleverly caused controversy when he was accused of calling Stockton North a "shithole" during a House of Commons debate after its member of Parliament, Alex Cunningham, challenged prime minister Rishi Sunak on the level of child poverty in the constituency. Residents have low levels of education and a high proportion work in the manufacturing and transport sectors. The percentage claiming unemployment benefits is high. White people made up 92% of the population at the 2021 census.

At the local borough council, the centres of Stockton and Billingham are represented by Labour Party councillors whilst the wealthier suburban areas elected Conservatives. Voters in Stockton North strongly supported leaving the European Union in the 2016 referendum; an estimated 68% voted in favour of Brexit compared to the UK-wide figure of 52%.

== History ==
The constituency was created for the 1983 general election, partially replacing the former Stockton-on-Tees constituency. The outgoing MP for Stockton-on-Tees was Bill Rodgers, who had held the seat since 1962. He had been a Labour Party member until 1981, when he left to found the Social Democratic Party (SDP).

The 1983 election was the first since Rodgers had left the Labour Party, and he was narrowly defeated by Labour's Frank Cook. Cook held the seat with majorities between 16% and 48% until the 2010 general election, when after 27 years as the MP he was de-selected by his local party. Cook chose to run again however, as an independent candidate. Cook polled less than 5% of the vote, fifth of the seven candidates who stood, and joined four of these in forfeiting his deposit and the seat was held by the Labour Party's next candidate, Alex Cunningham.

In November 2021, Cunningham announced his intention to stand down at the 2024 general election, when the seat was won by his successor as Labour candidate, Chris McDonald.

== Boundaries ==
Map of 2010–2024 boundaries

=== Historic ===
1983–1997: The Borough of Stockton-on-Tees wards of Blue Hall, Charltons, Elm Tree, Glebe, Grange, Hardwick, Marsh House, Mile House, Newtown, Northfield, Norton, Portrack and Tilery, Roseworth, St Aidan's, St Cuthbert's, Whitton, and Wolviston.

1997–2010: The Borough of Stockton-on-Tees wards of Blue Hall, Charltons, Glebe, Grange, Hardwick, Marsh House, Mile House, Newtown, Northfield, Norton, Portrack and Tilery, Roseworth, St Aidan's, St Cuthbert's, Whitton, and Wolviston.

2010–2024: The Borough of Stockton-on-Tees wards of Billingham Central, Billingham East, Billingham North, Billingham South, Billingham West, Hardwick, Newtown, Northern Parishes, Norton North, Norton South, Norton West, Roseworth, Stockton Town Centre, and Western Parishes.

=== Current ===
Further to the 2023 review of Westminster constituencies, which came into effect for the 2024 general election, the composition of the constituency was defined as comprising the following wards of the Borough of Stockton-on-Tees (as they existed on 1 December 2020):

- Billingham Central; Billingham East; Billingham North; Billingham South; Billingham West; Hardwick and Salters Lane; Newtown; Northern Parishes; Norton North; Norton South; Norton West; Parkfield and Oxbridge; Roseworth; Stockton Town Centre.

In order to bring the electorate within the permitted electoral range, the Parkfield and Oxbridge ward was transferred in from Stockton South (renamed Stockton West) in exchange for Western Parishes.

Following a local government boundary review which came into effect in May 2023, the constituency now comprises the following wards or part wards of the Borough of Stockton-on-Tees from the 2024 general election:

- Billingham Central; Billingham East; Billingham North; Billingham South; Billingham West & Wolviston; Eaglescliffe East (small part); Grangefield (majority); Hardwick & Salters Lane; Newtown; Northern Parishes (majority); Norton Central; Norton North; Norton South; Ropner; Roseworth; Stockton Town Centre; and a very small part of Hartburn.

Stockton North consists of the northern part of the Borough of Stockton-on-Tees in County Durham, including the town centre and the nearby towns and villages of Billingham, Norton, Wolviston and Thorpe Thewles.

== Members of Parliament ==
Election	Member	Party
1983	Frank Cook	Labour
2010	Alex Cunningham	Labour
2024	Chris McDonald	Labour

== Elections ==
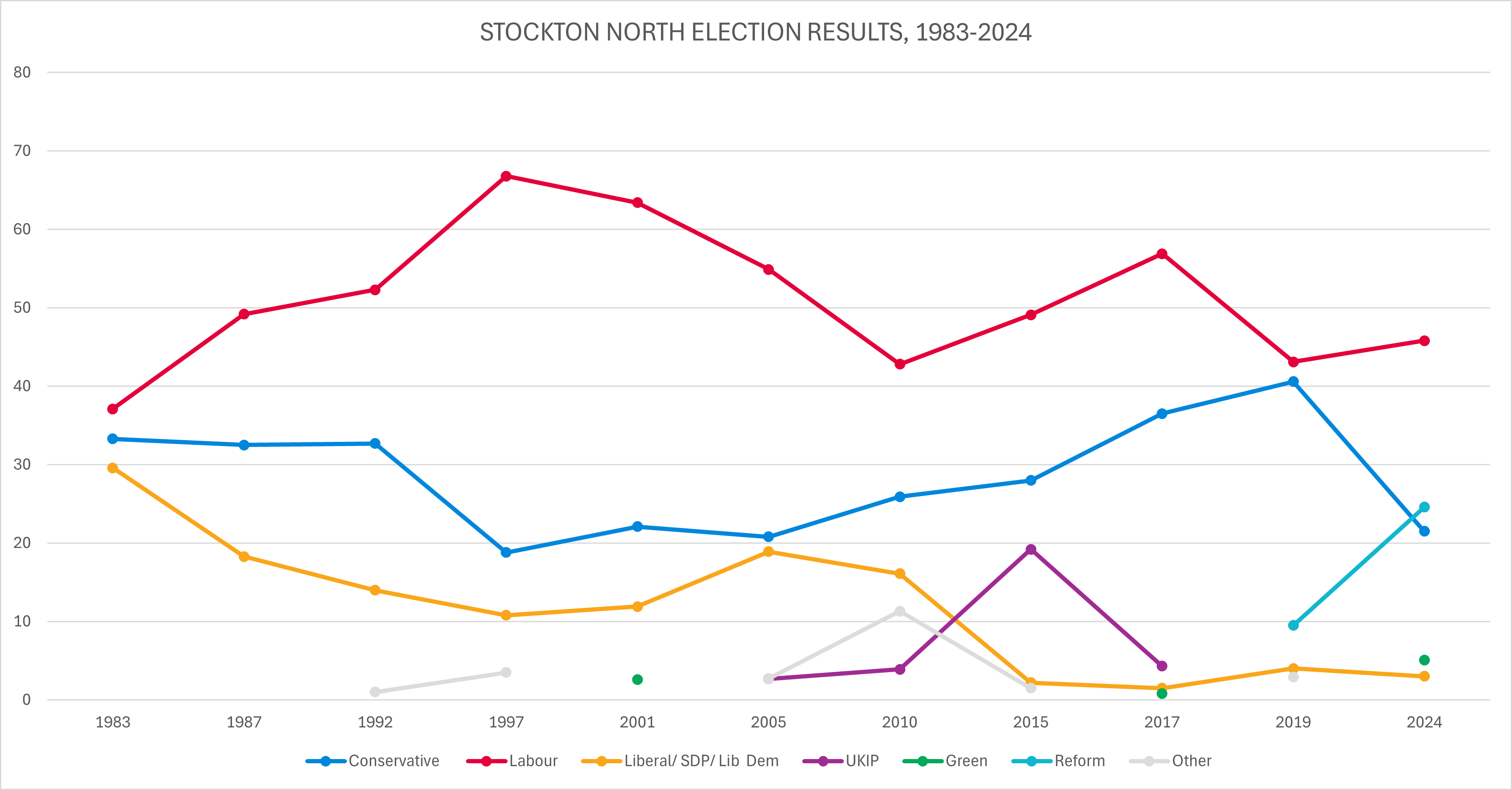
Election results 1983–2024

=== Elections in the 2020s ===
General election 2024: Stockton North
Party	Candidate	Votes	%	±%
Labour	Chris McDonald	17,128	45.8	−0.9
Reform	John McDermottroe	9,189	24.6	+15.6
Conservative	Niall Innes	8,028	21.5	−16.0
Green	Sam Bradford	1,923	5.1	N/A
Liberal Democrats	Jo Barton	1,133	3.0	−1.0
Majority		7,939	21.2	+18.7
Turnout		37,401	53.2	−8.6
Registered electors		70,242		
Labour hold		Swing		

=== Elections in the 2010s ===
General election 2019: Stockton North
Party	Candidate	Votes	%	±%
Labour	Alex Cunningham	17,728	43.1	−13.8
Conservative	Steven Jackson	16,701	40.6	+4.1
Brexit Party	Martin Walker	3,907	9.5	New
Liberal Democrats	Aidan King	1,631	4.0	+2.5
North East	Mark Burdon	1,189	2.9	New
Majority		1,027	2.5	−17.9
Turnout		41,156	61.7	−2.8
Labour hold		Swing	−9.0	

General election 2017: Stockton North
Party	Candidate	Votes	%	±%
Labour	Alex Cunningham	24,304	56.9	+7.8
Conservative	Mark Fletcher	15,589	36.5	+8.5
UKIP	Ted Strike	1,834	4.3	−14.9
Liberal Democrats	Sarah Brown	646	1.5	−0.7
Green	Emma Robson	358	0.8	New
Majority		8,715	20.4	−0.7
Turnout		42,731	64.5	+4.7
Labour hold		Swing	−0.3	

General election 2015: Stockton North
Party	Candidate	Votes	%	±%
Labour	Alex Cunningham	19,436	49.1	+6.3
Conservative	Christopher Daniels	11,069	28.0	+2.1
UKIP	Mandy Boylett	7,581	19.2	+15.3
Liberal Democrats	Anthony Sycamore	884	2.2	−13.9
North East	John Tait	601	1.5	New
Majority		8,367	21.1	+4.2
Turnout		39,571	59.8	+1.2
Labour hold		Swing	+2.2	

General election 2010: Stockton North
Party	Candidate	Votes	%	±%
Labour	Alex Cunningham	16,923	42.8	−12.0
Conservative	Ian Galletley	10,247	25.9	+4.7
Liberal Democrats	Philip Latham	6,342	16.1	−2.6
BNP	James MacPherson	1,724	4.4	+1.8
Independent	Frank Cook	1,577	4.0	New
UKIP	Gordon Parkin	1,556	3.9	+1.2
English Democrat	Ian Saul	1,129	2.9	New
Majority		6,676	16.9	−17.2
Turnout		39,498	58.6	+0.5
Labour hold		Swing	-8.3	

=== Elections in the 2000s ===
General election 2005: Stockton North
Party	Candidate	Votes	%	±%
Labour	Frank Cook	20,012	54.9	−8.5
Conservative	Harriett Baldwin	7,575	20.8	−1.3
Liberal Democrats	Neil Hughes	6,869	18.9	+7.0
BNP	Kevin Hughes	986	2.7	New
UKIP	Gordon Parkin	986	2.7	New
Majority		12,439	34.1	−7.2
Turnout		36,428	57.6	+2.8
Labour hold		Swing	-3.6	

General election 2001: Stockton North
Party	Candidate	Votes	%	±%
Labour	Frank Cook	22,470	63.4	−3.4
Conservative	Amanda Vigar	7,823	22.1	+3.3
Liberal Democrats	Mary Wallace	4,208	11.9	+1.1
Green	Bill Wennington	926	2.6	New
Majority		14,647	41.3	−6.7
Turnout		35,427	54.8	−14.2
Labour hold		Swing	−3.3	

=== Elections in the 1990s ===
General election 1997: Stockton North
Party	Candidate	Votes	%	±%
Labour	Frank Cook	29,726	66.8	+14.5
Conservative	Bryan Johnston	8,369	18.8	−13.9
Liberal Democrats	Suzanne Fletcher	4,816	10.8	−3.2
Referendum	Kevin McConnell	1,563	3.5	New
Majority		21,357	48.0	+28.4
Turnout		44,474	69.0	−7.8
Labour hold		Swing	+14.2	

General election 1992: Stockton North
Party	Candidate	Votes	%	±%
Labour	Frank Cook	27,918	52.3	+3.1
Conservative	Simon Brocklebank-Fowler	17,444	32.7	+0.2
Liberal Democrats	Suzanne Fletcher	7,454	14.0	−4.3
Independent Labour	Ken McGarvey	550	1.0	New
Majority		10,474	19.6	+3.0
Turnout		53,366	76.8	+1.4
Labour hold		Swing	+1.5	

=== Elections in the 1980s ===
General election 1987: Stockton North
Party	Candidate	Votes	%	±%
Labour	Frank Cook	26,043	49.2	+12.1
Conservative	David Faber	17,242	32.5	−0.8
SDP	Nicholas Bosanquet	9,712	18.3	−11.3
Majority		8,801	16.6	+12.8
Turnout		52,997	75.4	+5.1
Labour hold		Swing	+6.5	

General election 1983: Stockton North
Party	Candidate	Votes	%	±%
Labour	Frank Cook	18,339	37.1	
Conservative	Harry Davies	16,469	33.3	
SDP	Bill Rodgers	14,630	29.6	
Majority		1,870	3.8	
Turnout		49,438	70.3	
Labour win (new seat)				

== See also ==
- Stockton-on-Tees, approximate predecessor, abolished 1983.
- List of parliamentary constituencies in Cleveland
- History of parliamentary constituencies and boundaries in Cleveland
- List of parliamentary constituencies in North East England (region)

== Sources ==
- Election result, 2005 (BBC)
- Election results, 1997 – 2001 (BBC)
- Election results, 1997 – 2005 (Election Demon)
- Election results, 1983 – 1992 (Election Demon)
- Election results, 1992 – 2005 (Guardian)
