= Alex Cunningham =

British Labour politician (born 1955)

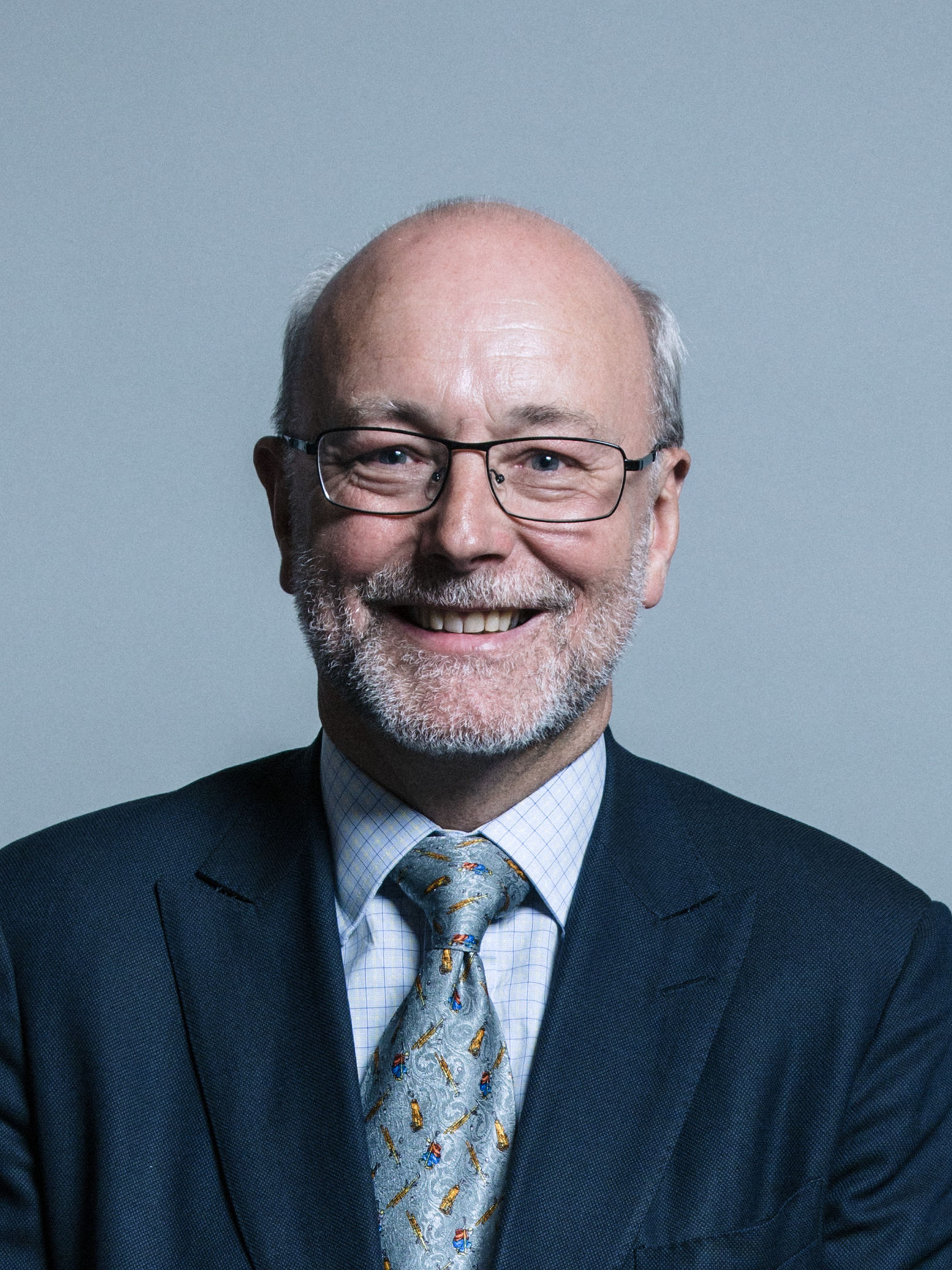
- Official portrait, 2017

Shadow Minister for Courts and Legal Services
- In office 9 April 2020 – 5 July 2024
- Leader: Keir Starmer
- Preceded by: Position established

Shadow Minister for Housing
- In office 8 April 2019 – 9 April 2020
- Leader: Jeremy Corbyn
- Preceded by: Melanie Onn
- Succeeded by: Mike Amesbury

Shadow Minister for Pensions
- In office 14 October 2016 – 21 December 2017
- Leader: Jeremy Corbyn
- Preceded by: Angela Rayner
- Succeeded by: Jack Dromey

Shadow Minister for the Natural Environment
- In office 18 September 2015 – 27 June 2016
- Leader: Jeremy Corbyn
- Preceded by: Barry Gardiner
- Succeeded by: Mary Glindon; Sue Hayman

Member of Parliament for Stockton North
- In office 6 May 2010 – 30 May 2024
- Preceded by: Frank Cook
- Succeeded by: Chris McDonald

Personal details
- Born: Alexander Cunningham; 1955 (age 70–71) Harthill, Scotland
- Party: Labour
- Spouse: Evaline (m. 1977)
- Children: 2
- Education: Darlington Technical College
- Occupation: Politician; journalist
- Website: Official website

Alexander Cunningham (born 1955) is a British politician who served as Member of Parliament (MP) for Stockton North from 2010 to 2024. A member of the Labour Party, he was Shadow Minister for Courts and Sentencing.

Born in Scotland and raised in Darlington, Cunningham began his career as a journalist in Teesside and later worked as a private sector communications officer in the region. He served on Cleveland County Council from 1984 to 1997 and Stockton-on-Tees Borough Council from 1999 to 2010, where he was a member of the council's executive.

Elected to Parliament at the 2010 general election, he deselected long serving incumbent MP Frank Cook to become the Labour candidate. Cunningham joined the opposition front bench as Parliamentary Private Secretary to Sadiq Khan, Shadow Justice Secretary, and became Shadow Natural Environment Minister in 2015. He resigned in 2016 due to a lack of confidence in Jeremy Corbyn's party leadership, but rejoined as Shadow Pensions Minister later in the year. Resigning from the front bench for the second time in 2017, to vote against the Labour whip on Brexit, he spent two years as backbencher before his appointment as a Shadow Housing Minister in 2019.

== Early life and career ==
Cunningham was born in Harthill, Scotland and moved to Darlington, County Durham at a young age. He was educated at Branksome Comprehensive School and the Queen Elizabeth Sixth Form College. Cunningham later attended Darlington Technical College, where he was awarded a certificate in journalism in 1976.

Beginning his career as journalist, he joined the Darlington & Stockton Times in 1974, moved to the Hartlepool Mail in 1976 and joined Radio Tees a year later. Cunningham's began working at The Evening Gazette in 1979, where he remained for five years until he became a press officer at British Gas. In 1995, he joined Transco (later National Grid) as a communications adviser, and was promoted to head of communications after five years. He left this job in 2002, later becoming managing director of Tees Valley Communicators.

== Political career ==
Cunningham was elected as a Member of Cleveland County Council in 1984, later becoming the vice-chairman of the education committee and serving on the council until 1997. He joined the Co-operative Party in 1986.

He served on Stockton-on-Tees Borough Council from 1999 until his election to Parliament in 2010, and was Cabinet Member for Children and Young People. Active in the Stockton North Constituency Labour Party, he was press officer from 1984 to 2010, vice chairman and secretary from 1985 to 1995, and chair from 1995 to 2000.

Cunningham was selected as the Labour candidate for Stockton North in January 2008, successfully challenging long-serving incumbent MP Frank Cook in a mandatory re-selection. Upon his selection, he commented that members "wanted change" and "a person who lived in the area for most of their life".

=== Parliamentary career ===
Cunningham was elected as MP for Stockton North at the 2010 general election, despite his majority being halved compared to the previous election. His predecessor Frank Cook unsuccessfully stood as an independent candidate, losing his deposit. He backed David Miliband in the 2010 Labour leadership election.

He was a member of the Work and Pensions Committee from 2010 to 2011, Education Committee from 2011 to 2015 and Environmental Audit Committee in 2019. Cunningham has sat on committees scrutinising the Armed Forces Act 2011 whilst it was a bill, as well as the Police, Crime, Sentencing and Courts Bill and Judicial Review and Courts Bill.

Cunningham joined Ed Miliband's opposition front bench upon his appointment as Parliamentary Private Secretary to Sadiq Khan, the Shadow Justice Secretary. Cunningham was re-elected with an increased majority in 2015, and nominated Andy Burnham and Caroline Flint in the 2015 Labour leadership and Deputy Leadership elections.

He was promoted to a shadow ministerial post following Jeremy Corbyn's election as Labour leader, becoming Shadow Minister for the Natural Environment in September 2015. Cunningham resigned from the front bench in June 2016, alongside a many of his colleagues, after losing confidence in Corbyn's leadership. He supported Owen Smith in the failed attempt to replace him in the 2016 Labour leadership election.

He re-joined the opposition front bench in October 2016 as Shadow Minister for Pensions, and was an re-elected in 2017 with an increased vote share but a swing towards the Conservatives. Cunningham resigned as a shadow minister in December 2017 after voting against the Labour whip, supporting an amendment to the EU (Withdrawal) Bill proposing remaining in the customs union. In November 2018, he wrote an article alongside other North-East Labour MPs backing a second referendum on EU membership. He became a shadow minister once again in April 2019 as a Shadow Minister for Housing.

Cunningham was re-elected at the 2019 general election with a significantly reduced majority. He endorsed Keir Starmer in the 2020 Labour leadership election, and nominated Ian Murray in the deputy leadership election. He was appointed Shadow Minister for Courts and Sentencing upon Starmer's election in April 2020.

On 25 November 2021, Cunningham announced he would be standing down from Parliament at the 2024 election.

On 22 November 2023, Cunningham accused Home Secretary James Cleverly of calling Stockton North a "shithole" in response to a question in the Commons; Cleverly denied the allegation, but apologised for using "unparliamentary language", which he claimed had been used to describe Cunningham himself.

== Personal life ==
Cunningham has been married to Evaline since 1977, who has served as a Member of Stockton-on-Tees Borough Council since 2011. They have two sons. He is a Christian.

Parliament of the United Kingdom
Preceded by Frank Cook	Member of Parliament for Stockton North; 2010–2024	Succeeded by Chris McDonald
