= 1962 Stockton-on-Tees by-election =

UK parliamentary by-election

← 1959	5 April 1962	1964 →

Stockton-on-Tees constituency
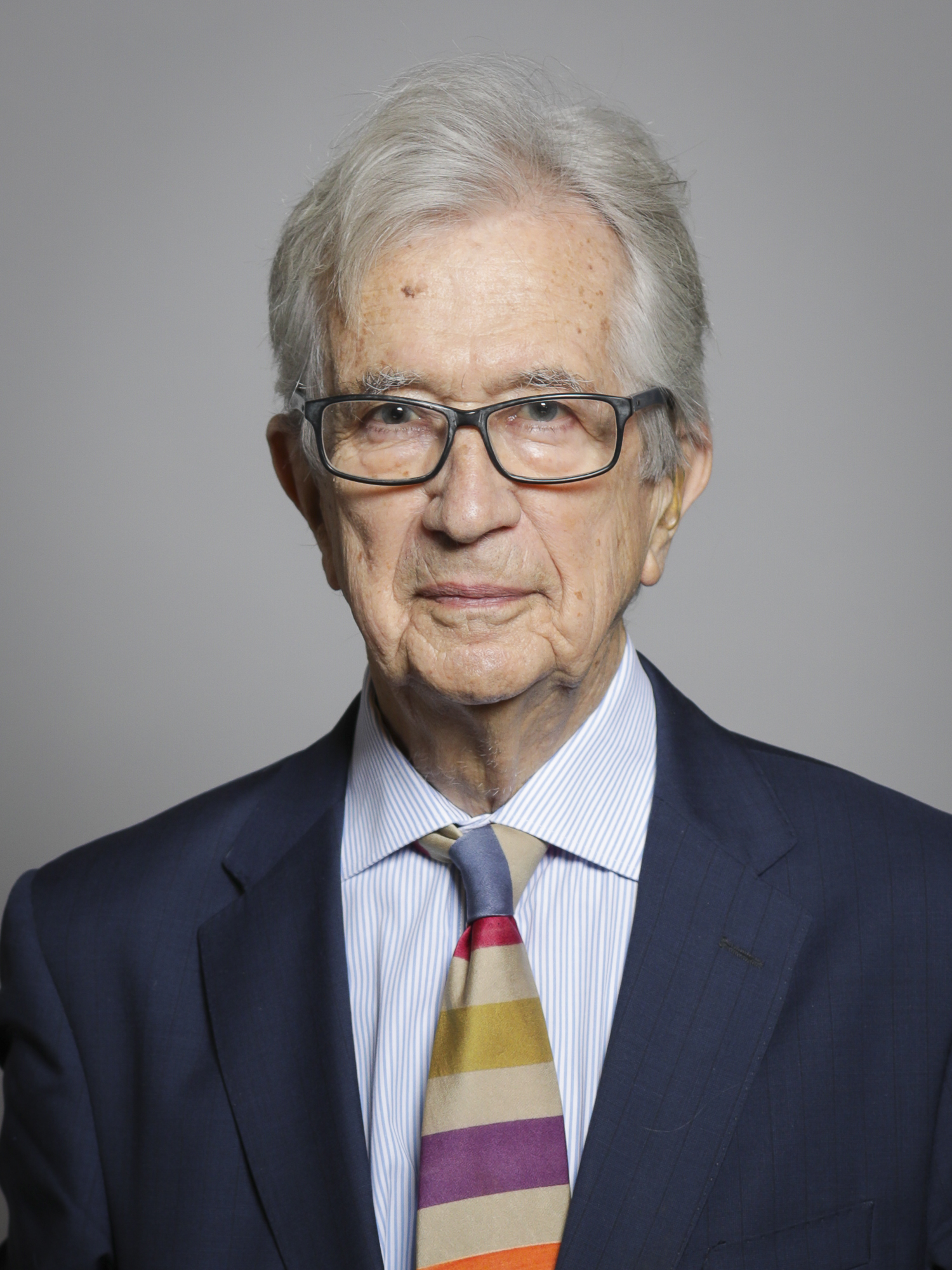
	First party	Second party	Third party
		Con	Lib
Candidate	Bill Rodgers	Gerald Coles	John Mullholland
Party	Labour	Conservative	Liberal
Popular vote	19,694	12,112	11,722
Percentage	45.2%	27.8%	26.9%
Swing	▼8.5 pp	▼18.5 pp	New
MP before election
George Chetwynd
Labour
Elected MP
Bill Rodgers
Labour

The 1962 Stockton-on-Tees by-election was a parliamentary by-election held for the House of Commons constituency of Stockton-on-Tees in County Durham on 5 April 1962. It was the by-election at which Bill Rodgers, a future Cabinet minister and member of the "Gang of Four" of senior Labour politicians who defected to form the SDP, entered Parliament. Rodgers subsequently helped to lead the SDP into the merger that formed the Liberal Democrats, and later served as that party's leader in the House of Lords. In the circumstances it is not without irony that Rodgers remembers future Liberal leader David Steel, then not yet a Member of Parliament (MP), loudly booing the result of the election at Stockton from the floor of the count.

== Vacancy ==
The by-election was caused by the resignation of the sitting Labour MP, George Chetwynd to take up the post of Director of the North East Development Council.

== Candidates ==
=== Labour ===
The Stockton Labour Party held a contest to select their candidate. Rodgers, who was then aged 33 and was a lecturer and economist, was the preferred candidate of retiring MP George Chetwynd. He had been recommended to Chetwynd by Hugh Dalton and Chetwynd took Rodgers to the constituency to introduce him to some key figures in the local party. Among the other hopefuls at the selection meeting were three local candidates as well as Maurice Foley who later became MP for West Bromwich and left-winger Renee Short, who went on to be MP for Wolverhampton North East. Rodgers won on the third ballot, taking most of second preferences from Foley and the local candidates.

=== Conservatives ===
The Conservatives chose a 28-year-old barrister, Gerald Coles, the son of a well-known Teesside Conservative, Alderman J W Coles of Redcar.

=== Liberal Party ===
The Liberal Party had hopes that Stockton-on-Tees, coming less than a month after their famous by-election victory at Orpington, and their near miss at Blackpool North the day before, could deliver another success. They trusted that in a seat where voters over the age of 50 could still remember a Liberal MP, enough of a Liberal tradition in Stockton still existed. This was despite the fact that the Liberals had not fought the seat at the three previous general elections in 1959, 1955 and 1951 and had forfeited their deposits in 1950 and 1945. The Liberals selected John Henry Mulholland, a 28-year-old personnel officer with ICI. Mulholland was a local man, having been born in Stockton-on-Tees with his parents still living in the town. He worked in Manchester and was a local councillor in Runcorn. John Mulholland's son went on to be a Liberal Democrat MP for Leeds North West, Greg Mulholland.

== The issues ==
Rodgers spent time attacking the Conservative government of Harold Macmillan. Macmillan was a former MP for Stockton-on-Tees and returned to the constituency to campaign for Coles, the first time since before the Second World War that a serving prime minister had been seen on the streets of by-election supporting his party's candidate. Rodgers' principal weapon of attack was the unemployment figures which had been steadily increasing over the past months and stood at 5% at the time of the by-election. The Conservative and Liberal candidates spent much of their time engaging in argument over whether Blackpool North and Orpington were flashes in the pan or the manifestation of something more permanent in British politics. However Macmillan concentrated on Britain's application to enter the Common Market in his speech to a packed crowd at Stockton's Maison de Danse. Indications were that this was not a popular or resonant issue with the voters who were unhappy about the treatment of pensioners and the government's imposed pay pause. They also felt a general desire for a change with the government having been in office since 1951.

== Result ==
On a turnout of 81%, Rodgers easily held the seat for Labour with an increased majority, which he had confidently predicted from the outset of the campaign. Despite all their hopes the Liberals did not quite beat the Conservative candidate into third place, failing by just 390 votes to capture second place but Stockton-on-Tees was one of series of by-elections at this time in which Liberal performance was improving and where the Conservative share of poll reduced. This culminated in the by-election at Leicester North East on 12 July 1962 when the Conservatives did fall into third place behind the Liberals. As a consequence, Macmillan reshuffled his cabinet removing seven ministers, including Chancellor of the Exchequer, Selwyn Lloyd who was held responsible for the unpopularity of the pay pause policy. This mass removal of ministers, referred to as 'the night of the long knives', smacked of desperation and caused many people to question Macmillan's political judgment. It also led to one of the best political quotations of the era from future Liberal leader Jeremy Thorpe when he commented: "Greater love hath no man than this, that he lay down his friends for his life".

Stockton-on-Tees by-election, 1962
Party	Candidate	Votes	%	±%
Labour	Bill Rodgers	19,694	45.2	−8.47
Conservative	Gerald Coles	12,112	27.8	−18.53
Liberal	John Mullholland	11,722	26.9	New
Majority		7,582	17.4	+10.06
Turnout		43,528		
Labour hold		Swing		

== See also ==
- Lists of United Kingdom by-elections
- United Kingdom by-election records
