= Joseph Dodds (British politician) =

British politician

Joseph Dodds (1819–1891) was a British politician. He was elected as a Liberal Member of Parliament for Stockton-on-Tees in 1868.

Dodds was forced to resign in 1888, having been accused of embezzling funds from a client of his law firm. After his resignation, he became Steward of the Manor of Northstead.

Dodds had five children: Anne (1849), Matthew (1851), Joseph (1853), Elizabeth (1854), Frederick (1855) and Margaret (1858).

Parliament of the United Kingdom
| New constituency | Member of Parliament for Stockton-on-Tees; 1868–1888 | Succeeded by Horace Davey |
