= Materials Processing Institute =

Research centre in the Tees Valley, England

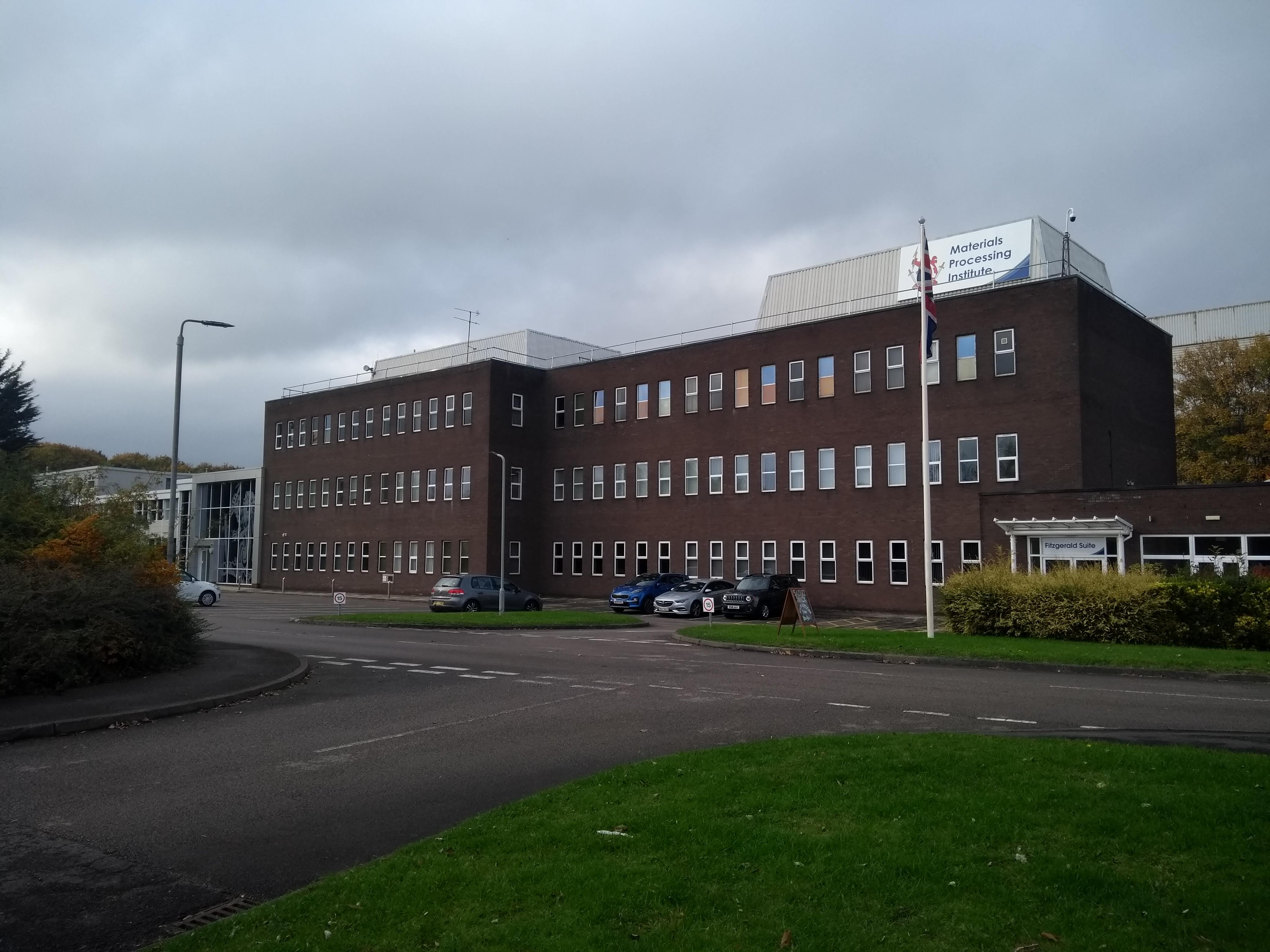
- Materials Processing Institute in 2022
- Trade name: Materials Processing Institute
- Industry: Advanced Materials, Low Carbon Energy and the circular economy
- Predecessor: Tata Steel, Teesside Laboratories
- Founded: 2014
- Headquarters: Middlesbrough, United Kingdom
- Number of locations: 1 Middlesbrough
- Area served: Worldwide
- Key people: David Pummell (Inteirm CEO)
- Services: Industrial Research and Development, Consultancy and Training
- Website: www.mpiuk.com

The Materials Processing Institute is a research centre serving organisations that work in advanced materials, low-carbon energy and the circular economy. The Institute is based in Tees Valley in the northeast of England.

== Background ==
The British Iron and Steel Research Association (BISRA), was formed in 1944 with headquarters in London, originally at 11 Park Lane, later moved to 24 Buckingham Gate. Satellite laboratories were formed much later to support the larger UK steel producing centres of Sheffield, Swansea, Teesside, and Battersea.

Following the second nationalisation of the UK Steel industry in 1967, BISRA became the R&D function of the newly formed British Steel Corporation.

Teesside Laboratories, later rebranded as Teesside Technology Centre, survived several rounds of R&D restructuring in which laboratories in Battersea and Swansea were ultimately closed.

In 2001, following the merger of British Steel with Koninklijke Hoogovens in 1999 (forming Corus Group PLC) Teesside Technology Centre, Welsh Laboratories and Swinden Technology Centre were to close to form a centralised UK Technology Centre. This was to mirror the single Dutch R&D site in IJmuiden. This centralisation attempt was backtracked but resulted in the closure of Welsh Laboratories and significant losses in numbers, knowledge and experience from both remaining centres.

In 2007, Tata Steel secured 100% of the Corus Group PLC shares, taking the company off the financial market.

In 2014, Tata Steel, already in the process of restructuring the UK arm of the European business, decided to also restructure UK R&D. Teesside Technology Centre and Swinden Technology Centre were to close with a new R&D Division being formed at Warwick Manufacturing Group. To avoid closure of the Teesside Laboratories and loss of the remaining technical process expertise in Coal & Coke, Oxygen Steelmaking, Continuous Casting and Long Products Rolling, members of the sites management team (Chris McDonald, Gareth Fletcher and Dr. Richard Curry) and the Tata Steel Process R&D Director (Dr. Simon Pike) were permitted to spin the site out as an independent research institute.

The Materials Processing Institute was launched December 2014.

== Present day ==
The Materials Processing Institute works with steel organisations from across the UK, including Tata Steel, Liberty House Group and British Steel. It also engages with international industry partners such as voestalpine AG, thyssenkrupp, ArcelorMittal and Sidenor.

The SME Technology Centre collaborates with NEPIC and Teesside University to support SMEs operating in Tees Valley and the wider North East region, through the Innovate Tees Valley and Tees Valley Business Start Up programmes, which are part funded by the European Regional Development Fund (ERDF).

In 2016, the Institute launched a commercial steel-making operation from its Normanton Steel plant, which has the capabilities to produce high carbon, high chrome steels.

In 2017, Liberty House Group won regional funding to develop a process to manufacture powder feedstock for additive manufacturing processes. Liberty chose to house the plant within the Materials Processing Institute.

The Materials Processing Institute is a member of UK Steel and was ratified, in October 2017, as an affiliated member of the World Steel Association, the international trade body for the iron and steel industry.

In 2018, intellectual property firm Marks & Clerk joined several other small firms in renting office space at the Institute's site. The move and new office was officially launched by Redcar MP Anna Turley.

== Specialist services ==
- SME Technology Centre: The Materials Processing Institute supports businesses throughout the North East of England through its SME Technology Centre. The Centre provides technical support, facilities support and business support services to companies from various sectors. There are also a number of SMEs operating from the Institute’s campus.
- The Doctoral Academy: The Academy has formed relationships with industrial companies, including SMEs, universities and Centres for Doctoral Training (CDT).
