= Stockton-on-Tees (constituency) =

Parliamentary constituency in the United Kingdom, 1868–1983

- Former borough constituency for the House of Commons
- Boundary of Stockton-on-Tees in County Durham, boundaries 1974–1983
- County: Cleveland

1868–1983
- Seats: One
- Created from: South Durham
- Replaced by: Stockton North and Stockton South

Stockton-on-Tees is a former borough constituency represented in the House of Commons of the Parliament of the United Kingdom. It elected one Member of Parliament (MP) by the first past the post system of election from 1868 to 1983.

== History ==
The constituency was created as the parliamentary borough of Stockton by the Reform Act 1867, but was named as Stockton-on-Tees under the Boundary Act 1868. It included Thornaby-on-Tees until the redistribution of seats for the 1950 general election.

In 1966, the borough of Stockton was absorbed into the newly created County Borough of Teesside and at the next periodic review of parliamentary constituencies which came into effect for the February 1974 election, it was officially named as Teesside, Stockton. A further local government reorganisation which came into effect in April 1974 saw Stockton re-established as a borough within the new county of Cleveland and, at the next redistribution which did not come into effect until the 1983 election, the Stockton-on-Tees constituency was abolished. The majority of the electorate, including Stockton town centre, Norton and Billingham were included in the new Stockton North seat, with parts included in Stockton South.

== Boundaries ==
=== 1868–1918 ===
Under the Reform Act 1867, the proposed contents of the new parliamentary borough were defined as the municipal borough of Stockton, and the township of Thornaby. However, this was amended under the Boundary Act 1868, with the boundary being extended to include the whole of the parish of Stockton, part of the township of Linthorpe and most of the parish of Norton.

See map on Vision of Britain website.

=== 1918–1950 ===
The Boroughs of Stockton-on-Tees and Thornaby-on-Tees.

Minor changes. Boundaries aligned to those of the local authorities.

=== 1950–1974 ===
The Borough of Stockton-on-Tees.

Thornaby-on-Tees transferred to Middlesbrough West.

=== 1974–1983 (Teesside, Stockton) ===
The County Borough of Teesside wards of Billingham East, Billingham West, Grangefield, Hartburn, Mile House, North End, Norton, Stockton South.

Billingham transferred from the abolished constituency of Sedgefield.

== Members of Parliament ==
Election	Member	Party
1868	Joseph Dodds	Liberal
1888 by-election	Sir Horace Davey	Liberal
1892	Thomas Wrightson	Conservative
1895	Jonathan Samuel	Liberal
1900	Sir Robert Ropner	Conservative
Jan. 1910	Jonathan Samuel	Liberal
1917 by-election	Bertrand Watson	Coalition Liberal
1922	Bertrand Watson	National Liberal
Nov 1923	Bertrand Watson	Liberal
Dec 1923	Robert Strother Stewart	Liberal
1924	Harold Macmillan	Conservative
1929	Frederick Fox Riley	Labour
1931	Harold Macmillan	Conservative
1945	George Chetwynd	Labour
1962 by-election	Bill Rodgers	Labour
1981	Bill Rodgers	SDP
1983	constituency abolished	

== Elections ==
=== Elections in the 1860s ===
General election 1868: Stockton-on-Tees
Party	Candidate	Votes	%	±%
Liberal	Joseph Dodds	2,476	74.1	
Conservative	Ernest McDonnell Vane-Tempest	867	25.9	
Majority		1,609	48.2	
Turnout		3,343	74.4	
Registered electors		4,492		
Liberal win (new seat)				

=== Elections in the 1870s ===
General election 1874: Stockton-on-Tees
Party	Candidate	Votes	%	±%
Liberal	Joseph Dodds	3,223	69.3	−4.8
Conservative	Francis Lyon Barrington	1,425	30.7	+4.8
Majority		1,798	38.6	−9.6
Turnout		4,648	78.0	+3.6
Registered electors		5,961		
Liberal hold		Swing	−4.8	

=== Elections in the 1880s ===
General election 1880: Stockton-on-Tees
Party	Candidate	Votes	%	±%
Liberal	Joseph Dodds	4,991	77.5	+8.2
Conservative	William Digby Seymour	1,452	22.5	−8.2
Majority		3,539	55.0	+16.4
Turnout		6,443	77.3	−0.7
Registered electors		8,333		
Liberal hold		Swing	+8.2	

General election 1885: Stockton-on-Tees
Party	Candidate	Votes	%	±%
Liberal	Joseph Dodds	4,237	57.5	−20.0
Conservative	Thomas Wrightson	3,133	42.5	+20.0
Majority		1,104	15.0	−40.0
Turnout		7,370	84.1	+6.8
Registered electors		8,761		
Liberal hold		Swing	−20.0	

General election 1886: Stockton-on-Tees
Party	Candidate	Votes	%	±%
Liberal	Joseph Dodds	3,822	57.5	0.0
Conservative	Thomas Wrightson	2,820	42.5	0.0
Majority		1,002	15.0	0.0
Turnout		6,642	75.8	−8.3
Registered electors		8,761		
Liberal hold		Swing	0.0	

Dodds resigned, causing a by-election.

By-election, 21 Dec 1888: Stockton-on-Tees
Party	Candidate	Votes	%	±%
Liberal	Horace Davey	3,889	52.7	−4.8
Conservative	Thomas Wrightson	3,494	47.3	+4.8
Majority		395	5.4	−9.6
Turnout		7,383	81.2	+5.4
Registered electors		9,094		
Liberal hold		Swing	−4.8	

=== Elections in the 1890s ===
General election 1892: Stockton-on-Tees
Party	Candidate	Votes	%	±%
Conservative	Thomas Wrightson	4,788	51.7	+9.2
Liberal	Horace Davey	4,477	48.3	−9.2
Majority		311	3.4	N/A
Turnout		9,265	88.9	+13.1
Registered electors		10,422		
Conservative gain from Liberal		Swing	+9.2	

General election 1895: Stockton-on-Tees
Party	Candidate	Votes	%	±%
Liberal	Jonathan Samuel	4,786	52.6	+4.3
Conservative	Thomas Wrightson	4,314	47.4	−4.3
Majority		472	5.2	N/A
Turnout		9,100	88.7	−0.2
Registered electors		10,256		
Liberal gain from Conservative		Swing	+4.3	

=== Elections in the 1900s ===
General election 1900: Stockton-on-Tees
Party	Candidate	Votes	%	±%
Conservative	Robert Ropner	5,262	51.9	+4.5
Liberal	Jonathan Samuel	4,873	48.1	−4.5
Majority		389	3.8	N/A
Turnout		10,135	89.6	+0.9
Registered electors		11,308		
Conservative gain from Liberal		Swing	+4.5	

General election 1906: Stockton-on-Tees
Party	Candidate	Votes	%	±%
Conservative	Robert Ropner	5,330	45.5	−6.4
Liberal	Sigismund Mendl	3,675	31.4	−16.7
Labour Repr. Cmte.	F. H. Rose	2,710	23.1	New
Majority		1,655	14.1	+10.3
Turnout		11,715	93.1	+3.5
Registered electors		12,581		
Conservative hold		Swing	+5.2	

=== Elections in the 1910s ===
General election January 1910: Stockton-on-Tees
Party	Candidate	Votes	%	±%
Liberal	Jonathan Samuel	6,026	55.1	+23.7
Conservative	J. Stroyan	4,913	44.9	−0.6
Majority		1,113	10.2	N/A
Turnout		10,939	94.4	+1.3
Registered electors		11,582		
Liberal gain from Conservative		Swing	+12.2	

General election December 1910: Stockton-on-Tees
Party	Candidate	Votes	%	±%
Liberal	Jonathan Samuel	5,510	53.2	−1.9
Conservative	H.A. Richardson	4,840	46.8	+1.9
Majority		670	6.4	−3.8
Turnout		10,350	89.4	−5.0
Registered electors		11,582		
Liberal hold		Swing	−1.9	

By-election, 1917: Stockton-on-Tees
Party	Candidate	Votes	%	±%
National Liberal	Bertrand Watson	7,641	92.8	+39.6
Independent	E. Beckhouse	596	7.2	New
Majority		7,045	85.6	+79.2
Turnout		8,237	59.3	−30.1
Registered electors		13,882		
National Liberal gain from Liberal		Swing	N/A	

General election 1918: Stockton-on-Tees
Party		Candidate	Votes	%	±%
C	National Liberal	Bertrand Watson	Unopposed		
	National Liberal hold				
C indicates candidate endorsed by the coalition government.

=== Elections in the 1920s ===
General election 1922: Stockton-on-Tees
Party	Candidate	Votes	%	±%
National Liberal	Bertrand Watson	12,396	38.0	N/A
Labour	Frederick Fox Riley	11,183	34.3	New
Liberal	Robert Strother Stewart	9,041	27.7	N/A
Majority		1,213	3.7	N/A
Turnout		32,620	85.9	N/A
National Liberal hold		Swing	N/A	

General election 1923: Stockton-on-Tees
Party	Candidate	Votes	%	±%
Liberal	Robert Strother Stewart	11,734	34.5	+6.8
Unionist	Harold Macmillan	11,661	34.3	New
Labour	Frederick Fox Riley	10,619	31.2	−3.1
Majority		73	0.2	N/A
Turnout		34,014	87.5	+1.6
Liberal hold		Swing		

General election 1924: Stockton-on-Tees
Party	Candidate	Votes	%	±%
Unionist	Harold Macmillan	15,163	42.0	+7.7
Labour	Frederick Fox Riley	11,948	33.1	+1.9
Liberal	Robert Strother Stewart	8,971	24.9	−9.6
Majority		3,215	8.9	N/A
Turnout		36,082	90.2	+2.7
Unionist gain from Liberal		Swing		

General election 1929: Stockton-on-Tees
Party	Candidate	Votes	%	±%
Labour	Frederick Fox Riley	18,961	41.2	+8.1
Unionist	Harold Macmillan	16,572	36.1	−5.9
Liberal	John Cecil Hayes	10,407	22.7	−2.2
Majority		2,389	5.1	N/A
Turnout		45,940	87.1	−3.1
Labour gain from Unionist		Swing	+7.0	

=== Elections in the 1930s ===
General election 1931: Stockton-on-Tees
Party	Candidate	Votes	%	±%
Conservative	Harold Macmillan	29,199	61.6	+25.5
Labour	Frederick Fox Riley	18,168	38.4	−2.8
Majority		11,031	23.2	N/A
Turnout		47,367	88.4	+1.3
Conservative gain from Labour		Swing	+14.1	

Communist Party candidate George Short submitted correct nomination papers but refused to submit the required deposit of £150, so his nomination was rejected.

General election 1935: Stockton-on-Tees
Party	Candidate	Votes	%	±%
Conservative	Harold Macmillan	23,285	48.9	−12.7
Labour	Susan Lawrence	19,217	40.3	+1.9
Liberal	Gerald Leslie Tossell	5,158	10.8	New
Majority		4,068	8.6	−14.6
Turnout		47,660	86.3	−2.1
Conservative hold		Swing	-7.3	

=== Elections in the 1940s ===
General Election 1939–40: Another General Election was required to take place before the end of 1940. The political parties had been making preparations for an election to take place from 1939 and by the end of this year, the following candidates had been selected;

- Conservative: Harold Macmillan
- Labour: J Erskine Harper
- Liberal: Gerald Tossell

General election 1945:Stockton-on-Tees
Party	Candidate	Votes	%	±%
Labour	George Chetwynd	27,128	55.1	+14.8
Conservative	Harold Macmillan	18,464	37.4	−11.5
Liberal	Gordon Page Evans	3,718	7.5	−3.3
Majority		8,664	17.7	N/A
Turnout		49,310	81.2	−5.1
Labour gain from Conservative		Swing	+13.1	

=== Elections in the 1950s ===
General election 1950: Stockton-on-Tees
Party	Candidate	Votes	%	±%
Labour	George Chetwynd	23,475	54.03	−1.07
Conservative	Richard Anthony Lamb	16,495	37.97	+0.57
Liberal	Anthony Graeme Gamble	3,475	8.00	+0.50
Majority		6,980	16.07	−1.63
Turnout		43,445	89.44	+8.24
Labour hold		Swing		

General election 1951: Stockton-on-Tees
Party	Candidate	Votes	%	±%
Labour	George Chetwynd	24,558	55.73	+1.70
Conservative	Henry Camden Ridge Laslett	19,511	44.27	+6.30
Majority		5,047	11.45	−4.62
Turnout		44,069	87.96	−1.48
Labour hold		Swing		

General election 1955: Stockton-on-Tees
Party	Candidate	Votes	%	±%
Labour	George Chetwynd	23,422	54.43	−1.30
Conservative	Charles Longbottom	19,607	45.57	+1.30
Majority		3,815	8.87	−2.58
Turnout		43,029	83.77	−4.19
Labour hold		Swing		

General election 1959: Stockton-on-Tees
Party	Candidate	Votes	%	±%
Labour	George Chetwynd	23,961	53.67	−0.76
Conservative	Gerald Coles	20,684	46.33	+0.76
Majority		3,277	7.34	−1.53
Turnout		44,645	83.88	+0.11
Labour hold		Swing		

=== Elections in the 1960s ===
1962 Stockton-on-Tees by-election
Party	Candidate	Votes	%	±%
Labour	Bill Rodgers	19,694	45.2	−8.47
Conservative	Gerald Coles	12,112	27.8	−18.53
Liberal	John Mulholland	11,722	26.9	New
Majority		7,582	17.4	+10.06
Turnout		43,528		
Labour hold		Swing		

General election 1964: Stockton-on-Tees
Party	Candidate	Votes	%	±%
Labour	Bill Rodgers	22,011	50.52	
Conservative	Ronald Bray	15,424	35.40	
Liberal	John Mulholland	6,130	14.07	N/A
Majority		6,587	15.12	
Turnout		43,565	81.79	
Labour hold		Swing		

General election 1966: Stockton-on-Tees
Party	Candidate	Votes	%	±%
Labour	Bill Rodgers	24,248	59.68	
Conservative	Patrick Vaughan Radford	15,547	38.38	
Communist	Ernest Jones	710	1.75	New
Majority		8,701	21.30	
Turnout		40,505	77.38	
Labour hold		Swing		

=== Elections in the 1970s ===
General election 1970: Stockton-on-Tees
Party	Candidate	Votes	%	±%
Labour	Bill Rodgers	22,283	54.87	
Conservative	Patrick Vaughan Radford	17,960	44.22	
Communist	Ernest Jones	369	0.91	
Majority		4,323	10.65	
Turnout		40,612	73.09	
Labour hold		Swing		

General election February 1974: Stockton-on-Tees
Party	Candidate	Votes	%	±%
Labour	Bill Rodgers	37,876	59.02	
Conservative	Beryl Sloan	25,505	39.74	
Communist	Ernest Jones	791	1.23	
Majority		12,371	19.28	
Turnout		64,172	75.96	
Labour hold		Swing		

General election October 1974: Stockton-on-Tees
Party	Candidate	Votes	%	±%
Labour	Bill Rodgers	32,962	55.77	
Conservative	Brian Mawhinney	18,488	31.28	
Liberal	N. Long	6,906	11.68	New
Independent	V. Fletcher	750	1.27	New
Majority		14,474	24.49	
Turnout		59,106	69.11	
Labour hold		Swing		

General election 1979: Stockton-on-Tees
Party	Candidate	Votes	%	±%
Labour	Bill Rodgers	34,917	53.10	
Conservative	Robert Jones	23,790	36.18	
Liberal	S.E. Dunleavy	6,074	9.24	
National Front	A. Bruce	384	0.58	New
Independent	V. Fletcher	343	0.52	
Communist	J. Smith	243	0.37	New
Majority		11,127	16.92	
Turnout		65,751	73.71	
Labour hold		Swing		

== See also ==
- History of parliamentary constituencies and boundaries in Durham

== Bibliography ==
- Craig, F. W. S. (1983). British parliamentary election results 1918–1949 (3 ed.). Chichester: Parliamentary Research Services. ISBN 0-900178-06-X.

== Sources ==
- Leigh Rayment's Historical List of MPs – Constituencies beginning with "S" (part 5)
