= Bill Rodgers, Baron Rodgers of Quarry Bank =

British politician (born 1928)

The Right Honourable The Lord Rodgers of Quarry Bank PC
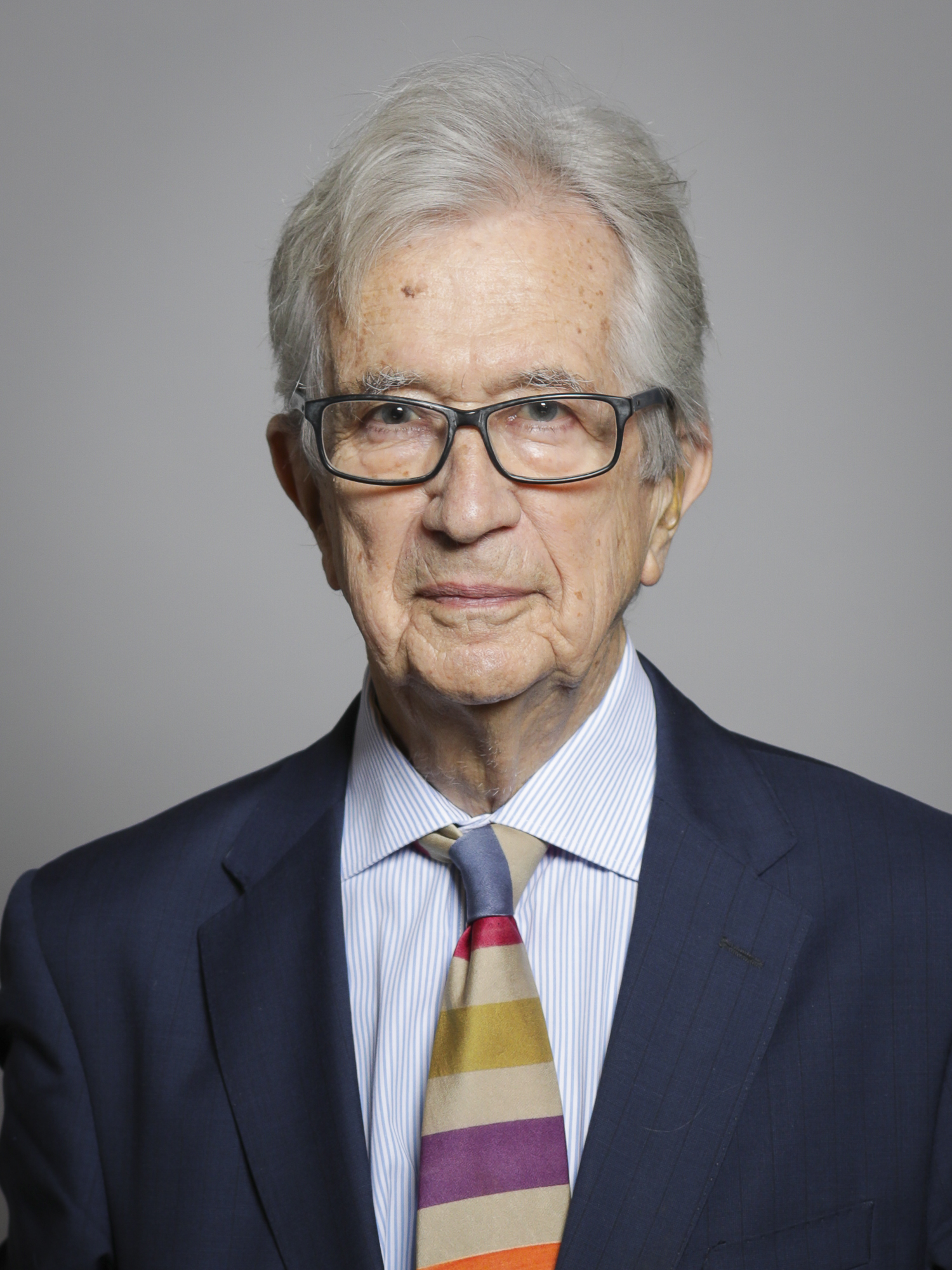
- Official portrait, 2019

Leader of the Liberal Democrats in the House of Lords
- In office 19 December 1997 – 7 June 2001
- Leader: Paddy Ashdown; Charles Kennedy
- Preceded by: The Lord Jenkins of Hillhead
- Succeeded by: The Baroness Williams of Crosby

Secretary of State for Transport
- In office 10 September 1976 – 4 May 1979
- Prime Minister: James Callaghan
- Preceded by: John Gilbert
- Succeeded by: Norman Fowler
Junior ministerial offices
Minister of State for Defence
In office 4 March 1974 – 10 September 1976
Prime Minister	Harold Wilson; James Callaghan
Sec. of State	Roy Mason; Fred Mulley
Preceded by	George Younger
Succeeded by	John Gilbert
Minister of State for the Treasury
In office 13 October 1969 – 19 June 1970
Prime Minister	Harold Wilson
Chancellor	Roy Jenkins
Preceded by	Dick Taverne
Succeeded by	Terence Higgins
Minister of State for the Board of Trade
In office 1 July 1968 – 13 October 1969
Prime Minister	Harold Wilson
President	Anthony Crosland; Roy Mason
Preceded by	Edmund Dell
Succeeded by	Goronwy Roberts
Parliamentary Under-Secretary of State for Foreign Affairs
In office 7 January 1967 – 3 July 1968
Prime Minister	Harold Wilson
Sec. of State	George Brown; Michael Stewart
Preceded by	The Lord Walston
Succeeded by	Maurice Foley (Foreign and Commonwealth Affairs)
Parliamentary Under-Secretary of State for Economic Affairs
In office 21 October 1964 – 7 January 1967 Serving with Maurice Foley (1964–1966)
Prime Minister	Harold Wilson
Sec. of State	George Brown; Michael Stewart
Preceded by	Office established
Succeeded by	Harold Lever; Peter Shore
Shadow cabinet offices
Shadow Secretary of State for Defence
In office 14 June 1979 – 8 December 1980
Leader	James Callaghan; Michael Foot
Shadowing	Francis Pym
Preceded by	Fred Mulley
Succeeded by	Brynmor John
Shadow Secretary of State for Transport
In office 4 May 1979 – 14 June 1979
Leader	James Callaghan
Shadowing	Norman Fowler
Preceded by	Norman Fowler
Succeeded by	Albert Booth
Parliamentary offices
Member of the House of Lords
Lord Temporal
Life peerage 12 February 1992 – 12 December 2023
Member of Parliament for Stockton-on-Tees
In office 5 April 1962 – 13 May 1983
Preceded by	George Chetwynd
Succeeded by	Constituency abolished

Personal details
- Born: 28 October 1928 (age 97) Liverpool, England
- Party: Liberal Democrats (1988–present)
- Other political affiliations: Labour (before 1981); SDP (1981–1988)
- Spouse: Silvia Szulman (m. 1955; died 2006)
- Children: 3
- Education: Magdalen College, Oxford

William Thomas Rodgers, Baron Rodgers of Quarry Bank, PC (born 28 October 1928) is a British politician and life peer. As a Labour Party member of Parliament, he served as Secretary of State for Transport from 1976 to 1979, and was one of the "Gang of Four" of senior Labour politicians who defected to form the Social Democratic Party (SDP). He subsequently helped to lead the SDP into the merger that formed the Liberal Democrats in 1988, and later served as the party's leader in the House of Lords between 1997 and 2001.

== Early life ==
Rodgers was born in Liverpool, Lancashire, and educated at Quarry Bank High School in Liverpool. After national service in the King's Regiment (Liverpool), he studied Modern History at Magdalen College, Oxford on an Open Exhibition. He was general secretary of the Fabian Society from 1953 to 1960 and a councillor on St Marylebone Borough Council from 1958 to 1962. He was instrumental in lobbying the National Executive Committee of the Labour Party to reverse its vote in favour of unilateral nuclear disarmament in 1961. He also unsuccessfully fought a by-election at Bristol West in 1957.

== Political career ==
Rodgers first entered the House of Commons at a by-election in 1962, representing Stockton-on-Tees, and served in Labour governments under Harold Wilson and James Callaghan, becoming Secretary of State for Transport in Callaghan's cabinet in 1976. Within the Labour Party, he was known for being a highly effective organiser around centrist causes such as multilateral nuclear disarmament and Britain's membership of the European Economic Community. He held the post until Labour's defeat in the 1979 general election. From 1979 to 1981 he was Shadow Defence Secretary. With Labour drifting to the left, Rodgers joined Shirley Williams, Roy Jenkins and David Owen in forming the Social Democratic Party (SDP) in 1981. In September 1982, Rodgers stood to become the president of the SDP, but took only 19.4 per cent of the vote, finishing in a distant second place behind Williams.

At the 1983 general election the SDP–Liberal Alliance won many votes but few seats, and Rodgers lost his seat of Stockton North (known as Stockton-on-Tees before the boundary changes of 1983). He remained outside Parliament, unsuccessfully contesting Milton Keynes for the SDP in the 1987 general election, until he was created a life peer as Baron Rodgers of Quarry Bank, of Kentish Town in the London Borough of Camden, on 12 February 1992. During that interval he was Director-General of the Royal Institute of British Architects and also became Chairman of the Advertising Standards Authority.

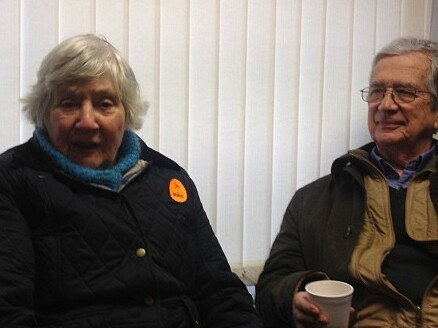
Rodgers (right) with Shirley Williams in 2013

In 1987, Rodgers was chairman of the successful "Yes to Unity" campaign within the SDP in favour of merger with the Liberal Party. He became the Liberal Democrats' Lords spokesman on home affairs in 1994 and was the party's leader in the Lords between 1997 and 2001. Rodgers's autobiography was titled Fourth Among Equals, reflecting his position as the least prominent of the SDP's founders. He was interviewed in 2012 as part of The History of Parliament's oral history project.

Rodgers retired from the House of Lords on 12 December 2023.

== Personal life ==
In 1955, Rodgers married Silvia Szulman (1928–2006), a Berlin-born artist and writer, who became a political hostess. The couple had three daughters: Rachel, Lucy, and Juliet.

On 8 May 2001, Rodgers suffered a stroke at his home and was treated at the Royal Free Hospital and attended speech therapy sessions at North Middlesex Hospital for two and a half years. He said he was "very, very lucky not to have suffered any physical damage" as a result. He has since been a keen advocate for better treatment and care for stroke victims.

== In popular culture ==
Rodgers was a main character in Steve Waters's 2017 play Limehouse, which premiered at the Donmar Warehouse; he was portrayed by Paul Chahidi.

== Bibliography ==
- John Campbell (2014). Roy Jenkins, a Well-Rounded Life. Jonathan Cape. ISBN 978-0-224-08750-6.

Party political offices
Preceded by Donald Chapman	General Secretary of the Fabian Society; 1953–1960	Succeeded by Shirley Williams
Preceded by Peter Townsend	Chair of the Fabian Society; 1966–1967	Succeeded by Arthur Blenkinsop
Preceded by The Lord Jenkins of Hillhead	Leader of the Liberal Democrats in the House of Lords; 1997–2001	Succeeded by The Baroness Williams of Crosby
Parliament of the United Kingdom
Preceded by George Chetwynd	Member of Parliament for Stockton-on-Tees; 1962–1983	Constituency abolished
Political offices
Preceded by John Gilbert as Minister of State for Transport	Secretary of State for Transport; 1976–1979	Succeeded by Norman Fowler as Minister of State for Transport
Preceded by Norman Fowler	Shadow Secretary of State for Transport; 1979	Succeeded by Albert Booth
Preceded by Fred Mulley	Shadow Secretary of State for Defence; 1979–1980	Succeeded by Brynmor John
Honorary titles
Preceded by The Lord Hattersley	Senior Privy Counsellor; 2026-present	Incumbent
Orders of precedence in the United Kingdom
Preceded by The Lord Craig of Radley	Gentlemen; Baron Rodgers of Quarry Bank	Followed by The Lord Wilson of Tillyorn
