= Freda Westwood =

Freda Mary Westwood (née Barker; 12 October 1924 – 10 September 2011) was a British political activist. She was one of the first women to be a regional organiser for the Labour Party, serving as regional organiser for the West Midlands from 1977 to 1986.

== Life ==
Freda Barker was born in Birmingham in 1924. Leaving school in 1938, she started work in a drapery store. With the outbreak of war she worked making bullets in the Birmingham ammunition works before moving to the Spitfire factory in Castle Bromwich in 1942. She met and married George Westwood in 1941.

The Westwoods joined the Labour party in 1948. In 1960, Freda Westood became an unpaid constituency agent for Bob Chamberlain, the party's West Midlands regional organiser. In 1966 she ensured the victory of the actor Andrew Faulds over the anti-immigrant Tory candidate Peter Griffiths at the Smethwick constituency. In 1968, she complained to the British government about the racism of the television series Tarzan.

In 1969, Westwood became assistant regional organiser for the West Midlands, though she stayed at Smethwick for the 1970 general election. When Bob Chamberlain died in 1977, she succeeded him as regional organiser, remaining in the role until her retirement in 1986. In 1990, she and her husband were presented by John Prescott with certificates of merit for their service to the party.
