= Smethwick =

Town in West Midlands, England

Coordinates: 52°29′35″N 01°58′07″W

- Town
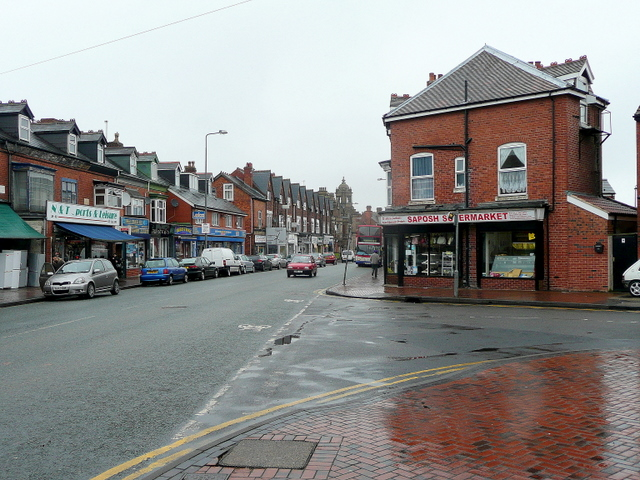
- Waterloo Road, Smethwick

- Location within the West Midlands
- Population: 53,653 (2019 est, built-up-area subdivision); 15,246 (Ward)
- OS grid reference: SP0287
- Metropolitan borough: Sandwell
- Metropolitan county: West Midlands
- Region: West Midlands
- Country: England
- Sovereign state: United Kingdom
- Areas of the town: List: Bearwood; Cape Hill; French Walls; Londonderry (part); Rood End; Smethwick West; Warley (Part); Warley Woods (Part)
- Post town: SMETHWICK
- Postcode district: B66, B67
- Dialling code: 0121
- Police: West Midlands
- Fire: West Midlands
- Ambulance: West Midlands
- UK Parliament: Smethwick

Smethwick (/ˈsmɛðɪk/) is an industrial town in the Sandwell district, in the county of the West Midlands, England. It lies 4 miles (6 km) west of Birmingham city centre. Historically it was in Staffordshire and then Worcestershire before being placed into West Midlands county.

In 2019, the ward of Smethwick had an estimated population of 15,246, while the wider built-up area subdivision has a population of 53,653.

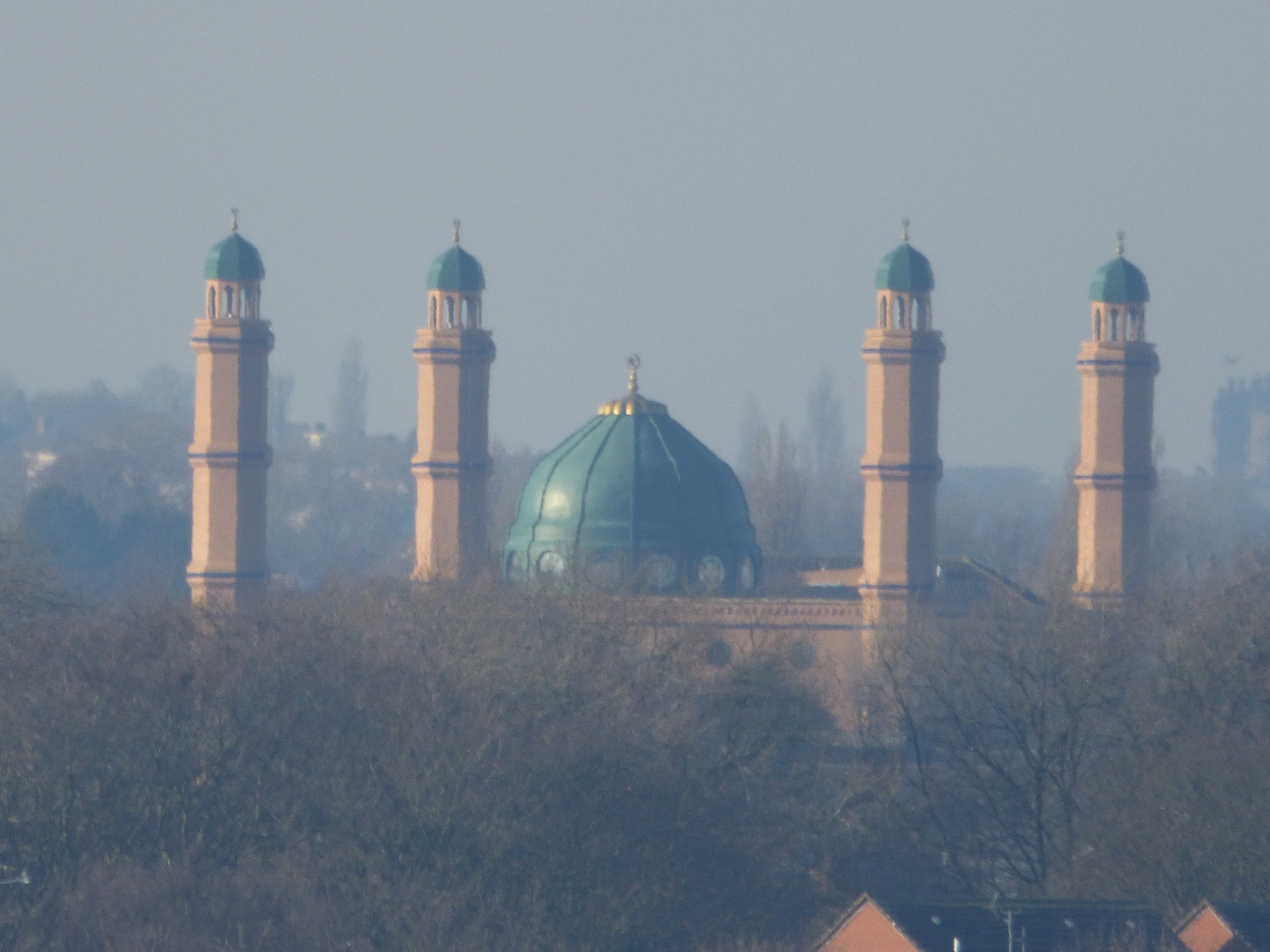
Smethwick Jamia Masjid Mosque

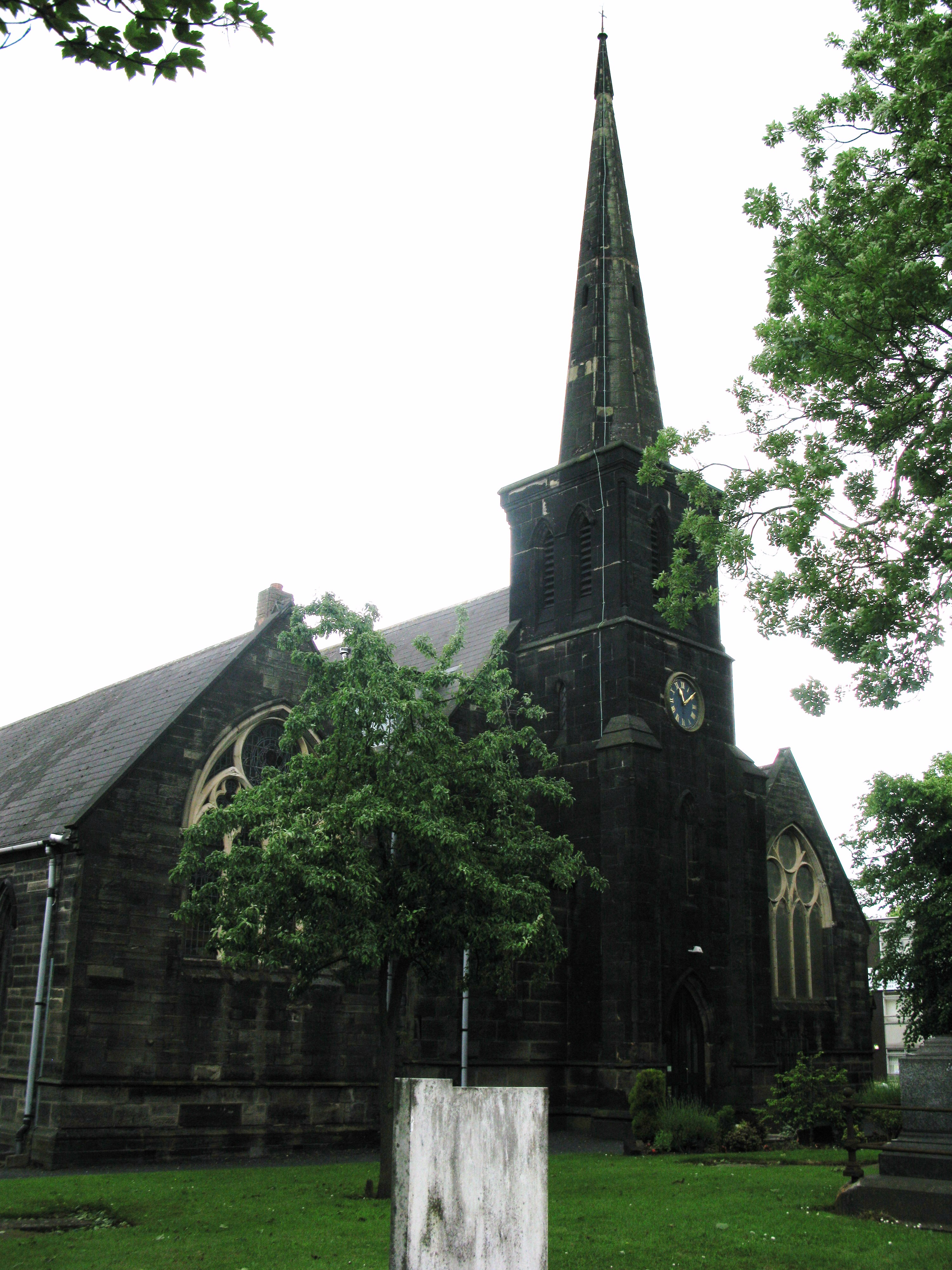
Smethwick Holy Trinity Church

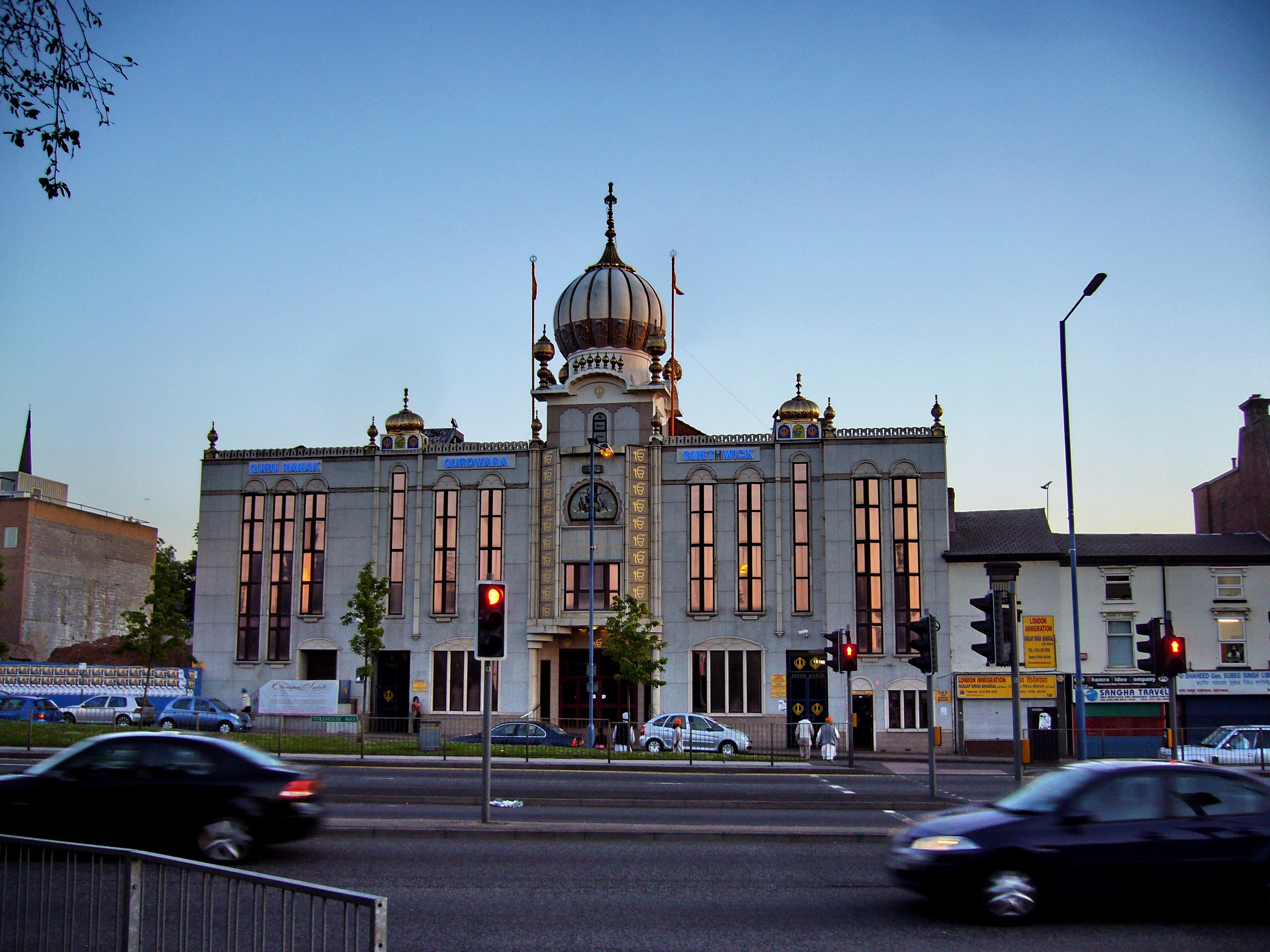
Smethwick Guru Nanak Gurdwara

== History ==
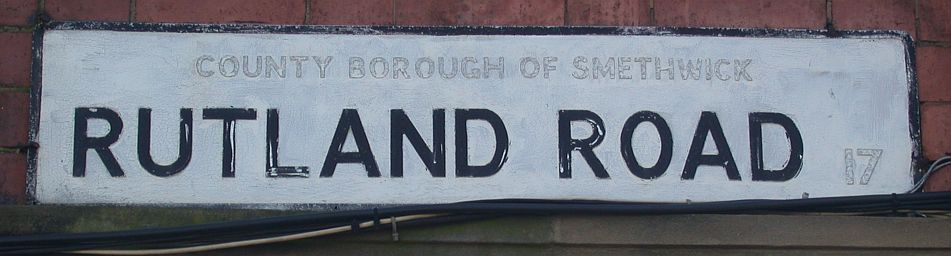
Street nameplate on Rutland Road, Smethwick in April 2007, showing painted out "County Borough" lettering, and the former postal district 17

It was suggested that the name Smethwick meant "smiths' place of work", but a more recent interpretation has suggested the name means "the settlement on the smooth land". Smethwick was recorded in the Domesday Book as Smedeuuich, the d in this spelling being the Anglo-Saxon letter eth. Until the end of the 18th century it was an outlying hamlet of the south Staffordshire village of Harborne. Harborne became part of the county borough of Birmingham and thus transferred from Staffordshire to Warwickshire in 1891, leaving Smethwick in the County of Staffordshire.

The world's oldest working engine, the Smethwick Engine, made by Boulton & Watt, originally stood near Bridge Street, Smethwick. It is now at Thinktank, the new science museum in Birmingham.

One notable company was The London Works, manufacturing base of the Fox Henderson Company which made the cast-iron framework for the Crystal Palace. This was founded by Charles Fox, whose inventions included the first patented railway points. His notable employees included William Siemens, the notable mechanical and electrical engineer. The company was bankrupted in 1855 by the failure of an overseas railway to pay for work done. The site was later used by GKN. In 2015 the site was being cleared to build the new Midland Metropolitan University Hospital which aims to combine the Sandwell General Hospital at West Bromwich and City Hospital, Dudley Road. Work at the site later came to a standstill because of a crisis in the construction industry.

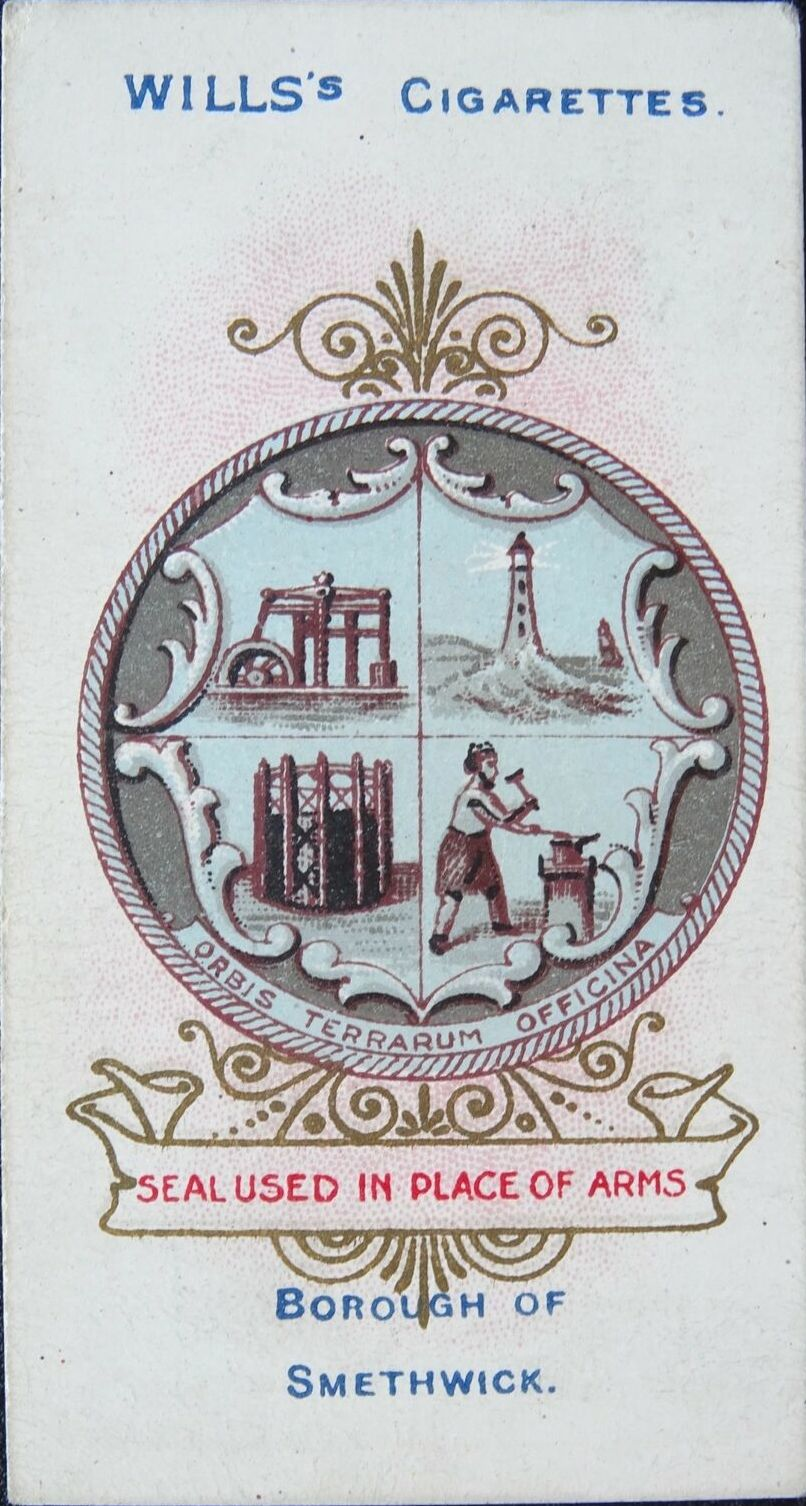
Cigarette card issued in 1906 by Wills's Cigarettes, depicting the Borough of Smethwick's "seal used in place of arms". The seal carries the Latin motto "Orbis Terrarum Officina" ("The Workshop of the World") and depicts a James Watt engine, a lighthouse (representing Chance Brothers glass works), a gasometer and a blacksmith working at his anvil.

Other former industry included railway rolling stock manufacture, at the Birmingham Railway Carriage and Wagon Company factory; screws and other fastenings from Guest, Keen and Nettlefolds (GKN); engines from Tangye; tubing from Evered's; steel pen nibs from British Pens; and various products from Chance Brothers' glassworks, including lighthouse lenses and the glazing for the Crystal Palace (the London works, in North Smethwick, manufactured its metalwork). Phillips Cycles, once one of the largest bicycle manufacturers in the world, was based in Bridge Street, Smethwick. Nearby, in Downing Street, is the famous bicycle saddle maker, Brooks Saddles. The important metalworking factory of Henry Hope & Sons Ltd was based at Halford's Lane where the company manufactured steel window systems, roof glazing, gearings and metalwork.

Council housing began in Smethwick after 1920 on land previously belonging to the Downing family, whose family home became Holly Lodge High School for Girls in 1922. The mass council house building of the 1920s and 1930s also involved Smethwick's boundaries being extended into part of neighbouring Oldbury in 1928.

The Ruskin Pottery Studio, named in honour of the artist John Ruskin, was in Oldbury Road. Many English churches have stained glass windows made by Hardman Studios in Lightwoods House, or, before that, by the Camm family.

During the Second World War, Smethwick was bombed on a number of occasions by the German Luftwaffe. A total of 80 people died as a result of these air raids.

After the First World War about 50+ Sikh families settled in Smethwick beginning in 1917, with a majority of the men being veterans of the war. After the Second World War, Smethwick attracted a large number of immigrants from Commonwealth countries beginning in 1945, the largest ethnic group being Sikhs from the Punjab in India, the majority of whom had served in that War. The ethnic minority communities were initially unpopular with the white population of Smethwick, leading to the election of Conservative Party Member of Parliament (MP) Peter Griffiths at the 1964 general election, who campaigned by appealing to the racist element and whose supporters had used the slogan, "If you want a nigger for a neighbour, vote Labour". This came two years after race riots had hit the town in 1962; it was also set against a background of local factory closures.

In 1961, the Sikh community purchased the unused Congregational Church on the High Street in Smethwick. Soon after, this was converted into a gurdwara, today known as the [Guru Nanak Gurdwara Smethwick].

Bearwood Primary School appointed Tony O'Connor as head teacher in 1967. He was the first black head teacher in the UK, having been born in Jamaica and moved to Britain with the RAF in 1943. Smethwick received bad publicity when, the day after the announcement of his appointment, racist slogans and swastikas were daubed around the school. However, O'Connor was well liked by both parents and children; he eventually retired in 1983.

In the mid- to late 1960s, a large council estate in the west of Smethwick was built. It was officially known as the West Smethwick Estate, but as all of the homes were constructed from concrete the estate was known locally as the "concrete jungle". The homes, mostly three or four storey townhouses, were prone to damp and other construction faults. By the 1980s, levels of crime and unemployment on the estate were high, and by the early 1990s, Sandwell Council had decided to demolish it. Between 1993 and 1997, the estate was entirely redeveloped with modern low-rise housing, and was renamed Galton Village. Another local housing estate called the Windmill Lane Estate, located near Cape Hill, was also redeveloped. Due to reports of crime, high unemployment rates, and structural issues within the estate, the Windmill Lane Estate, which included high-rise flats Murdoch Place and Boulton place, was demolished in 1988.

There is a collection of red brick turn-of-20th century terrace, 1930s semi-detached, newly built modern housing and a number of high rise blocks of flats. Other estates and areas include Black Patch, Cape Hill, Uplands, Albion Estate, Bearwood, Londonderry and Rood End.

In July 2013, a major fire occurred at the Jayplas plastics and paper recycling plant on Dartmouth Road.

=== Architecture ===
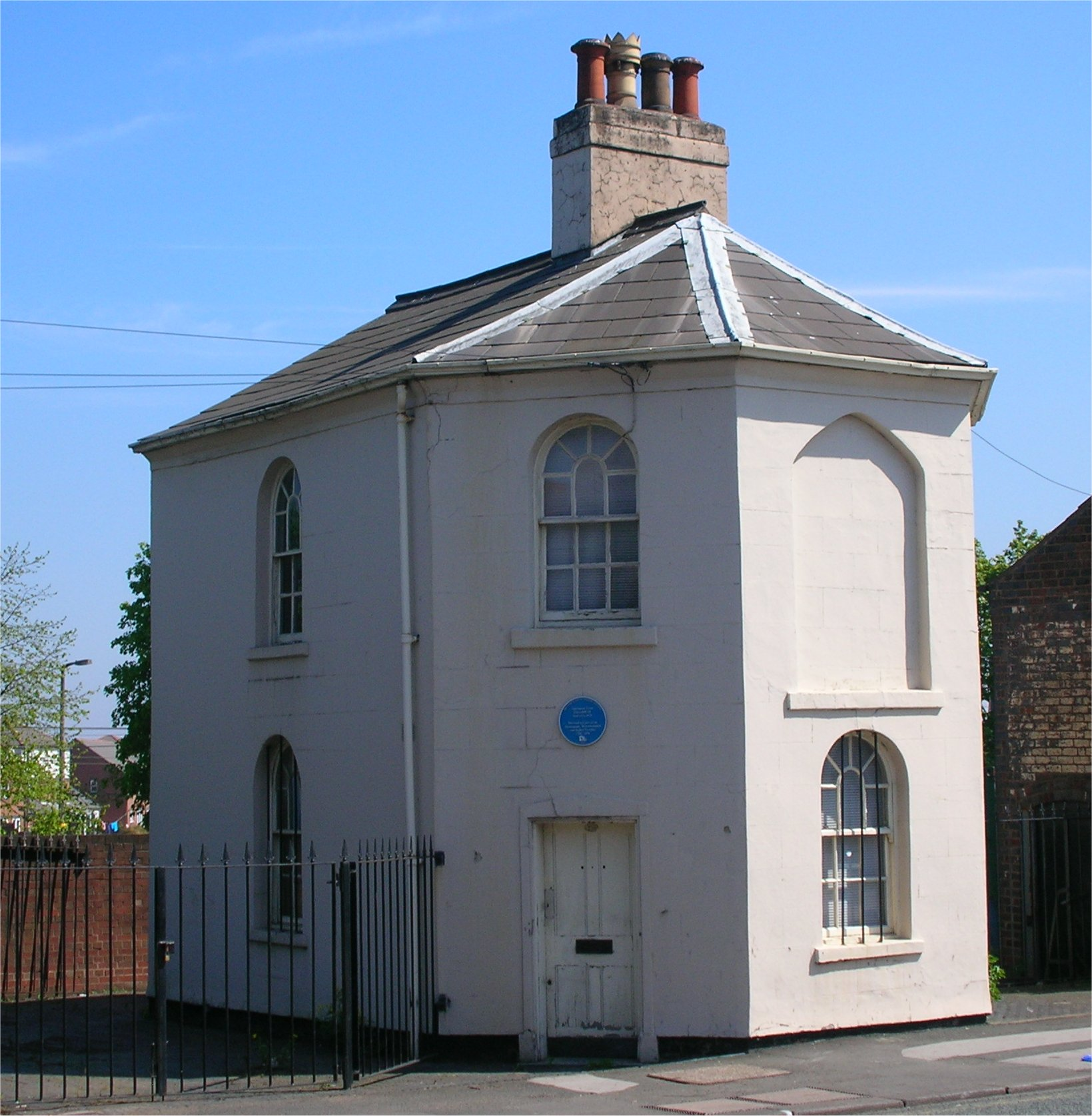
The old Toll House

The oldest surviving building in Smethwick is the Old Church which stands on the corner of Church Road and the Uplands. This was consecrated in 1732 as a Chapel of Ease in the parish of St Peter, Harborne. The building was originally known as "Parkes' Chapel" in honour of Mistress Dorothy Parkes who bequeathed the money for the church and also for a local school. The chapel was later known as the "Old Chapel", and the public house next to it is still called this. In the church there are several fine memorials, including one to Dorothy Parkes.

The Grade I listed Galton Bridge spans the New Line canal and railway. When built in 1829 by Thomas Telford, it was the highest single-span bridge in the world. Its name commemorates Samuel Galton, a local landowner and industrialist. It is identical to Telford's bridge at Holt Fleet over the River Severn built in 1828 and opened in 1830.

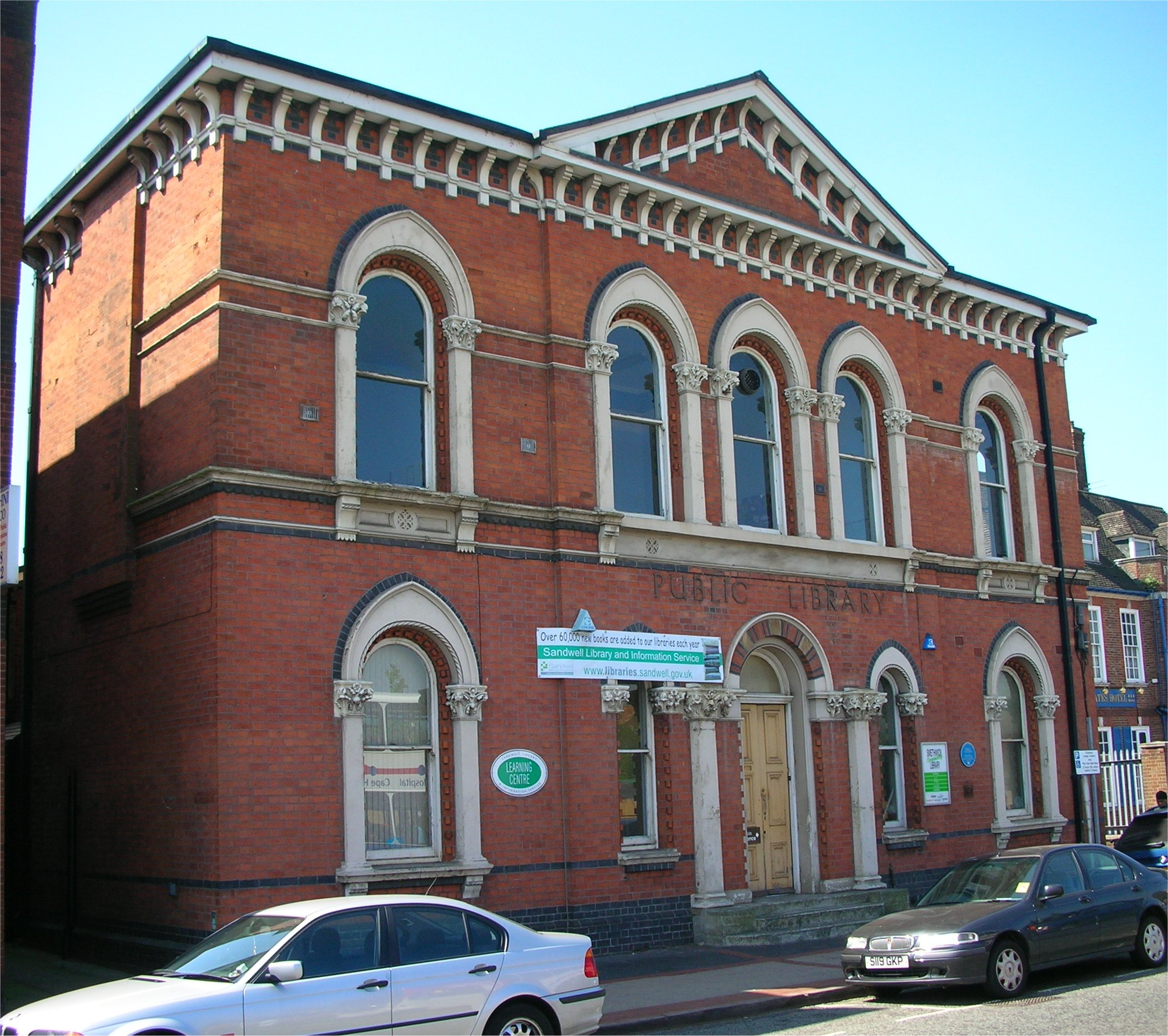
The public library by Yeoville Thomason

The public library in the High Street was originally built as the Public Hall in 1866–67 and is designed by Yeoville Thomason.

Matthew Boulton and James Watt opened their Soho Foundry in the north of Smethwick (not to be confused with the Soho Manufactory in nearby Soho) in the late 18th century. In 1802, William Murdoch illuminated the foundry with gas lighting of his own invention. The foundry was later home to weighing scale makers W & T Avery Ltd.

Rolfe Street public baths were among the first public swimming baths in the country when opened north of the town centre in 1888. The baths remained open for nearly a century before closing. In the late 1980s, the Black Country Museum expressed interest in transferring the building to its site in Dudley and so the transfer of the building began in 1989. It was finally opened to visitors at the museum in 1999, housing the museum's exhibition gallery and archive resource centre.

Thimblemill Library is a Grade II listed building built in brick in the Moderne style.

=== Political history ===
The town is notable for a somewhat turbulent political history.

It was first created as a separate parliamentary constituency in 1918, having previously been part of the Handsworth constituency. At that year's general election, Christabel Pankhurst, standing as a Women's Party candidate, narrowly failed to become one of Britain's first woman Members of Parliament. She lost to the Labour candidate by 775 votes in a straight fight.

Labour held the seat until 1931; from 1926, the MP was Sir Oswald Mosley, future founder of the British Union of Fascists. Mosley resigned the Labour whip in March 1931, but continued to represent the constituency until it was taken by the Conservatives at that year's general election. Labour won it back at the UK general election of 1945, held on 26 July that year. However, the victorious MP, Alfred Dobbs, was killed in a car crash the very next day. He is thus the shortest-serving Member of Parliament (MP) in British history, if one discounts a few cases of people being elected posthumously. In the resulting by-election, Patrick Gordon Walker won again for Labour. The seat remained held by Labour until 1964.

At the 1964 general election, sitting MP Gordon Walker, who was Shadow Foreign Secretary, was defeated in highly controversial circumstances in the constituency by the virulently anti-immigration Conservative Party candidate Peter Griffiths. Smethwick had attracted immigration from the Commonwealth in the economic and industrial growth of the years following the Second World War and Griffiths ran a campaign critical of the government's policy. His supporters had circulated the slogan "If you want a nigger for a neighbour, vote Liberal or Labour." Griffiths declined to condemn the slogan. Colin Jordan, a British Neo-Nazi and later leader of the British Movement, said that members of his group had produced the initial slogan as well as spread the publicised poster and sticker campaign which contained it; Jordan's group in the past had also campaigned on other slogans, such as: "Don't vote – a vote for Tory, Labour or Liberal is a vote for more Blacks!". Jordan would also use similar campaign tactics against Gordon Walker in the 1965 Leyton by-election. The election of Griffiths led to Smethwick becoming notorious as 'Britain's most racist town'.

Historian Rachel Yemm argues that the anti-immigration sentiment in the town was the result of a housing shortage, which local newspapers, such as The Smethwick Telephone, blamed on the migrants. Griffiths not only drew on these fears, but also raised racist concerns about 'miscegenation' and argued for the repatriation of migrants. At the beginning of 1965 Smethwick Council was planning "to purchase all available houses on Marshall Street to prevent their sale to immigrants". This made national headlines, and the plan was later stopped by the government. In February 1965, American black activist Malcolm X visited Marshall Street just days before his assassination. Earlier in his career he had advocated the complete separation of African Americans from whites, but he now showed his opposition to racial segregation, telling the press:

I have come here because I am disturbed by reports that coloured people in Smethwick are being treated badly. I have heard they are being treated as the Jews were under Hitler. I would not wait for the fascist element in Smethwick to erect gas ovens.

Malcolm X had been invited to Smethwick by Claudia Jones on behalf of Avtar Singh Jouhl of the Indian Workers' Association. The BBC had been intending to make a feature about a new black-led newspaper, and a BBC News journalist had a view to X having a debate with Griffiths outside a council house in Smethwick. Griffiths declined at late notice, and so an interview with X was conducted on the streets of Smethwick. This was to be one of X's last TV interviews before his assassination nine days later. The footage was never screened until Stephen C Page, a community artist, uncovered the footage in 2005.

Labour candidate and actor Andrew Faulds defeated Griffiths in the 1966 general election, remaining as an MP until his retirement at the 1997 general election, 23 years after Smethwick became part of the Warley East constituency. Griffiths subsequently moved away from the area and later served as Conservative MP for Portsmouth North.

=== Civic history ===
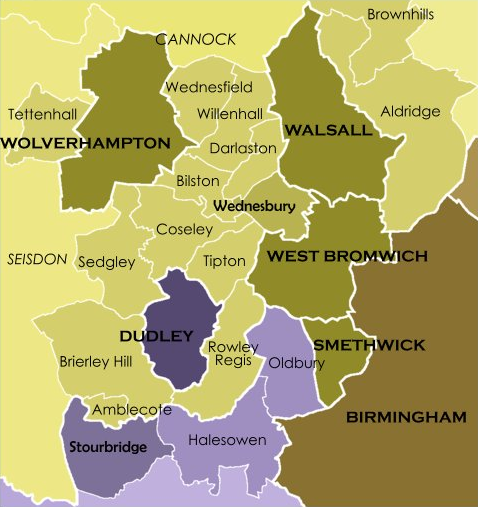
The local government structure within North Worcestershire and South Staffordshire – Prior to the West Midlands Order 1965 reorganisation

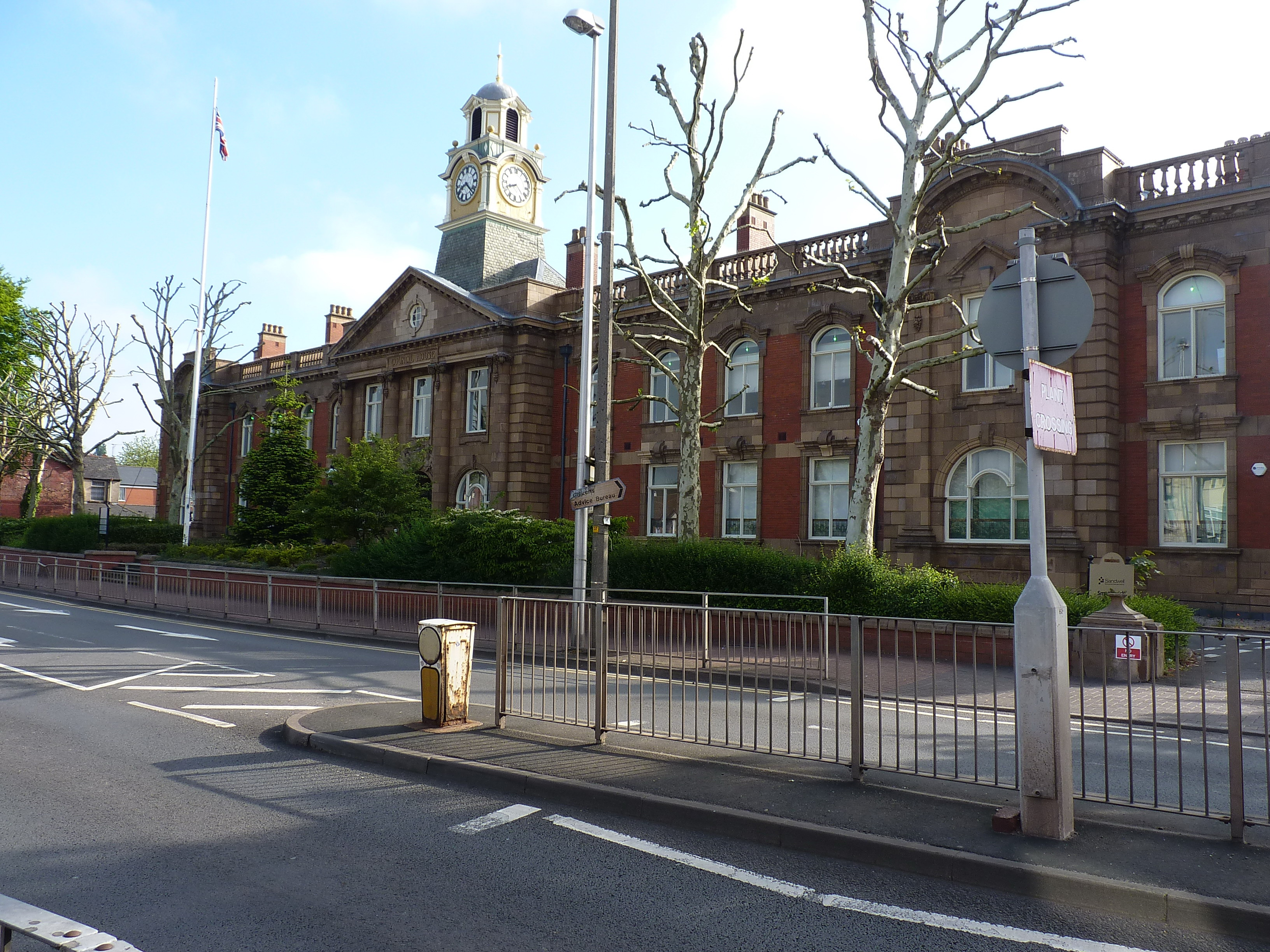
Smethwick Council House

Originally a hamlet within the parish of Harborne, Staffordshire, Smethwick was made into an urban district in 1894, on 31 December Smethwick became a civil parish, in 1899 the district became a municipal corporation, and the district became county borough within Staffordshire in 1907 with its base at Smethwick Council House. On 1 April 1966, Smethwick was merged with the boroughs of Oldbury and Rowley Regis to form the new County Borough of Warley, part also went to the County Borough of West Bromwich and the County Borough of Birmingham, Smethwick was transferred into the county of Worcestershire. The parish was also abolished on 1 April 1966 to form Warley, part also went to West Bromwich and Birmingham. In 1961 the parish had a population of 68,390. Warley county borough in turn was merged with West Bromwich in 1974 to form the Sandwell Metropolitan Borough, which was incorporated into the new West Midlands county.

In 1888, there had been plans for Smethwick to be incorporated into the city of Birmingham, but the urban district council voted against these plans by a single vote.

The archives for the Borough of Smethwick are held at Sandwell Community History and Archives Service.

=== Transport history ===
==== Canals ====
Smethwick has a long association with canals, which were the town's first major transport links from a time before decent roads and of course railways. The Birmingham Canal Navigation Old and New Main Line Canals run through the industrial areas and right past the High Street, running parallel to the Stour Valley Line: all three end up in Wolverhampton. James Brindley was the engineer charged with building the canal, a man who gives his name to the busy district in the centre of Birmingham near the International Convention Centre, National Indoor Arena and Broad Street.

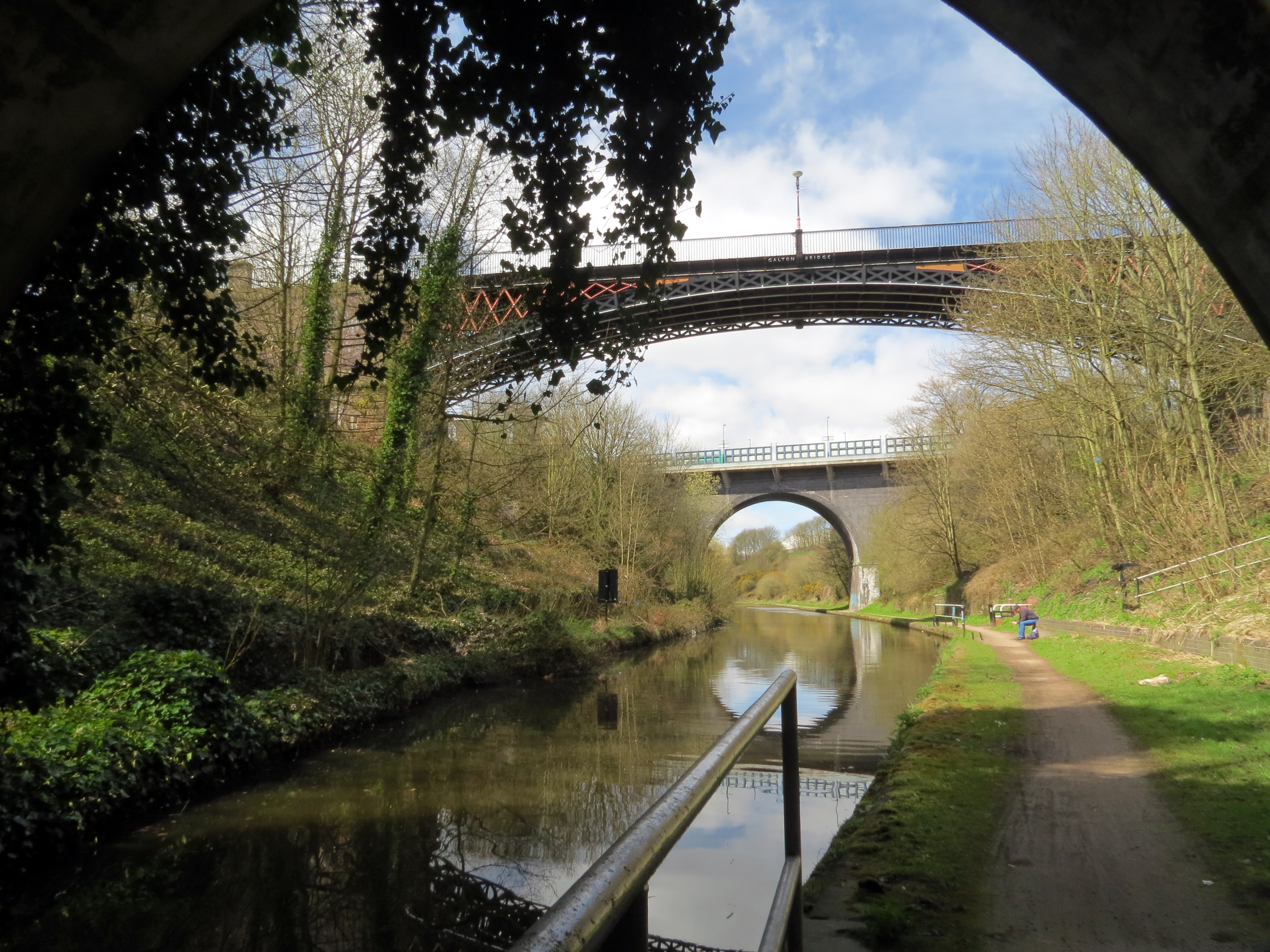
Galton Bridge viewed from the Galton Tunnel

The old main line was completed through Smethwick by 1769. It required 12 locks to climb over the hill through the town; Brindley had found the earth too soft to dig a cutting through at the time. Water was supplied by two steam engines. One of them was located on the Engine Arm which led to the Smethwick Engine on Rabone Lane and the other was near Spon Lane. New Smethwick Pumping Station next to Brasshouse Lane was added later in 1892. Because of the locks, the canal through Smethwick became a bottleneck and Thomas Telford was commissioned in 1824 to look at alternatives.

The new main line through Smethwick was completed by 1829 and completely bypassed all six remaining locks of the summit with a deep cutting. The Engine Arm and Stewarts aqueducts were built to carry their respective canals over the new mainline. The cutting was built through the land of the local businessman Samuel Galton and thus this cutting created the Galton Valley and Galton Bridge was named in his honour. The bridge was the longest single-span iron bridge in the world at the time. The canals of the new and old main line diverged at one end at Smethwick Junction near Bridge Street and rejoined at Bromford Junction near Bromford Road in Oldbury.

Today Galton Valley is a nature area and of more historical interest than commercial, and used mainly for leisure rather than transporting commercial goods.

==== Railways ====
The LNWR was the first to construct a railway through Smethwick in 1852 from New Street towards Wolverhampton and the North West, Rolfe Street and Spon Lane opened that year followed by Soho in 1853. In 1867 the Stourbridge Railway opened a link between the Great Western Birmingham, Wolverhampton & Dudley Railway (of 1852) near the current Hawthorns and Stourbridge with a station at Smethwick West and a link to the Stour Valley line towards New Street called Smethwick Junction, the Stourbridge Railway was merged into the Great Western in 1870. Not until 1931 was a railway station constructed at the Hawthorns, although it was a 'halt' primarily for the football ground; this station closed in 1967.

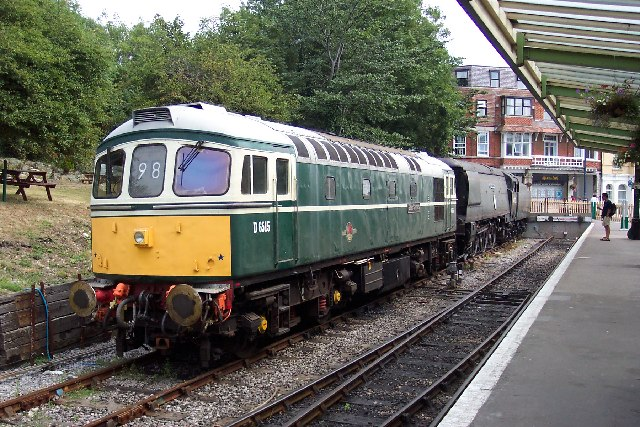
British Rail Class 33 at Swanage, built by the Birmingham Railway Carriage & Wagon Company

From 1854 the Birmingham Railway Carriage & Wagon Company was based in Smethwick until its closure in 1963. The company not only built main-line trains, but also London Underground stock, buses and military equipment.

Soho railway station closed in 1949, followed by Spon Lane station in 1968. In 1972 the section of line between Smethwick West and Birmingham Moor Street, as well as the Birmingham, Wolverhampton and Dudley railway, was closed, with the exception of a single line between Smethwick West and Coopers Scrap Metal in Handsworth; and all Stourbridge services were diverted into Birmingham New Street. In 1995 the line between Birmingham Snow Hill and Smethwick West was restored and a new station called Smethwick Galton Bridge was constructed over both the Snow Hill and Stour Valley lines to provide an interchange. Smethwick West was due to close when Galton Bridge opened, but due to a legal error British Railways had to maintain a parliamentary train service to the station. Most local trains from Stourbridge to Birmingham were diverted into Snow Hill although it was not until 2004 that the last regular service used the route into Birmingham New Street via Smethwick Junction.

Soho TMD is located next to Soho rail junction; road access is just off Wellington Street. It is the principal train depot for West Midlands Trains' Class 323 train fleet, which are often seen providing local train services in the area.

==== Buses and trams ====
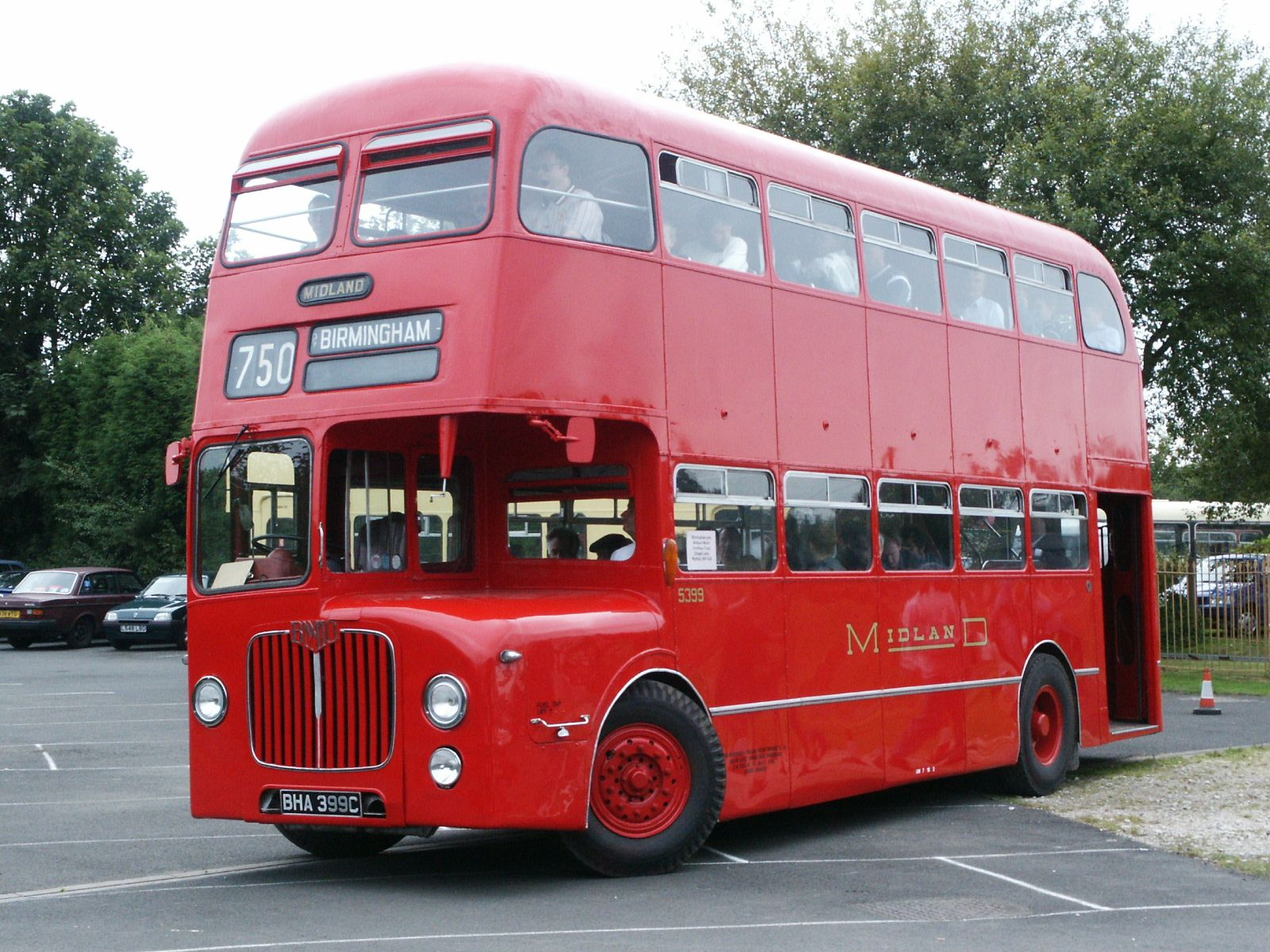
A Midland Red D9 in 2002

The town of Smethwick has a long association with buses. From 1914 Midland Red was based on Bearwood Road on the site of the current Bearwood Shopping Centre until 1974. The garage later saw use as an indoor market until it was demolished in 1979. Smethwick never had its own Corporation Transport Department, like West Bromwich or Birmingham. Most bus services until the earlier 1970s were provided by the Midland Red, West Bromwich and Birmingham. In the early 1970s, all local bus transport was taken over by the WMPTE until deregulation in the 1980s. Since then, National Express West Midlands has been the primary operator in the West Midlands.

Steam trams started through Smethwick in 1885 operated by Birmingham and Midland Tramways. These were replaced by electric trams in 1904 and then merged into the Birmingham Corporation Tramways in 1906 and trams eventually ran from both the Dudley Road and Hagley Road direction. Dudley Road trams operated to Cape Hill and then diverged to either take the route towards Dudley (Route 87) via the High Street or towards Bearwood (Route 29) via Waterloo Road, terminating near the site of current Bearwood Bus Station and Kings Head public house. Route 34 from Birmingham to Bearwood along the Hagley Road and terminated at the top of Bearwood Road next to the route from Cape Hill, despite terminating so close to each other there was no physical link between route 29 and 34 in Bearwood. Route 34 was the first route in Smethwick to disappear, in 1930; the last tram route was closed in 1939 and replaced by motor buses. Both the current West Midlands Bus routes 82 and 87 are former tram routes and the 87 in fact uses the same number.

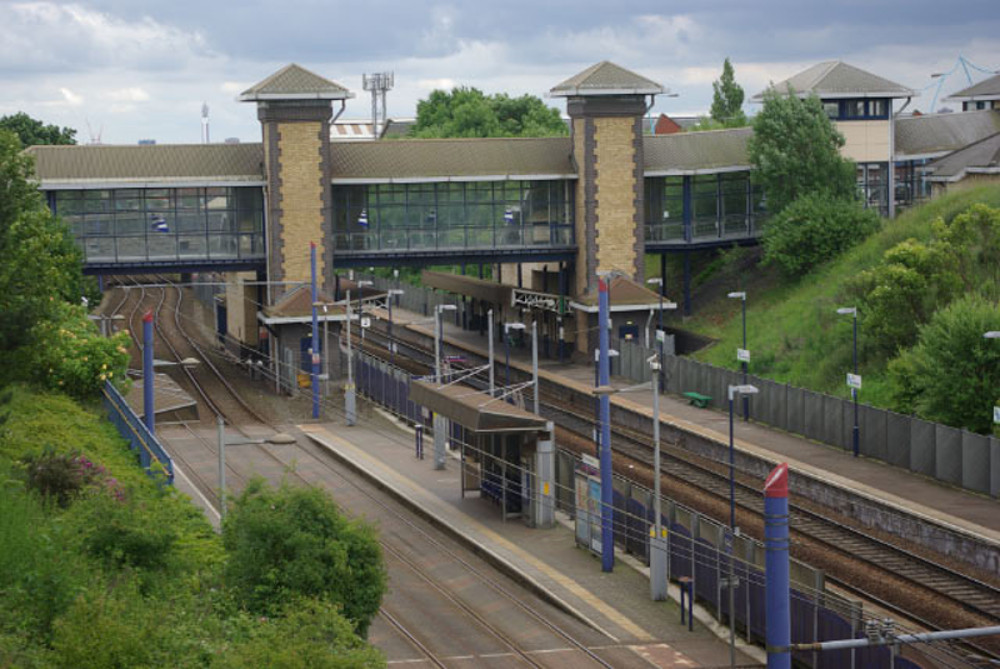
The Hawthorns railway station and metro stop

The West Midlands Metro, opened in 1999, is more of a light railway than a tramway. It follows the former Great Western Railway track bed from Birmingham Snow Hill station to the former Wolverhampton Low Level via West Bromwich until Priestfield in Wolverhampton. After that, it becomes a tramway proper and runs along the Bilston Road into Wolverhampton city centre. From late 2015 the service was extended from its former terminus at Snow Hill through the city centre to Grand Central. The metro can be caught at the Hawthorns railway station.

== Geography ==
Smethwick borders West Bromwich and Oldbury to the north and west, and the Birmingham districts of Handsworth, Winson Green, Harborne, Edgbaston and Quinton to the south and east.

== Demographics ==
In 1955, Smethwick had 2,000 'coloured immigrants', and by 1964, around 6% of Smethwick was estimated to be non-White. In 1991, it had risen to 33.3% non-White, half of this (17.6%) being Indian.

In foreign born status, 2.8% were born abroad in 1951, rising to 6.5% in 1961, 14% in 1971, 18% in 1981, declining to 17.4% in 1991 and then rising again to 20% in 2001 and 30.9% in 2011.

At the 2011 census, there were 48,765 residents in Smethwick in 18,381 households, and the median age of Smethwick residents was 32.

In terms of ethnicity in 2011:

- 43.3% of Smethwick residents were White (Comprising 37.6% White British, 4.6% Other White, 1.1% Irish and 0.1% Gypsy/Irish Traveller).
- 37.5% were Asian (Comprising 15.7% Indian, 12.4% Pakistani, 4.4% Bangladeshi 0.4% Chinese and 4.6% from another Asian background)
- 11.3% were Black (Comprising 6.1% Caribbean, 3.3% African and 1.9% other Black)
- 4.7% were Mixed.
- 0.5% were Arab and 2.8% were from another ethnic group.

In terms of religion, 39.5% of Smethwick residents identified as Christian, 21.8% were Muslim, 15.7% were Sikh, 14.0% said they had no religion, 5.8% did not state any religion, 2.3% were Hindu, 0.3% were Buddhists, and 0.6% were from another religion.

== Industry and commerce ==
Until the end of the 18th century, Smethwick was largely rural, with farming as the main industry. A water mill named Briddismylne is recorded in 1499 as belonging to Halesowen Abbey, thought to be on the more recent Thimblemill site. In 1659, a mill in the Hockley Brook is recorded as belonging to a Mr. Lane. The mill which led to the street name "Windmill Lane" was built on land bought in 1803 by William Croxall, a miller. The last part of the windmill building was demolished in 1949.

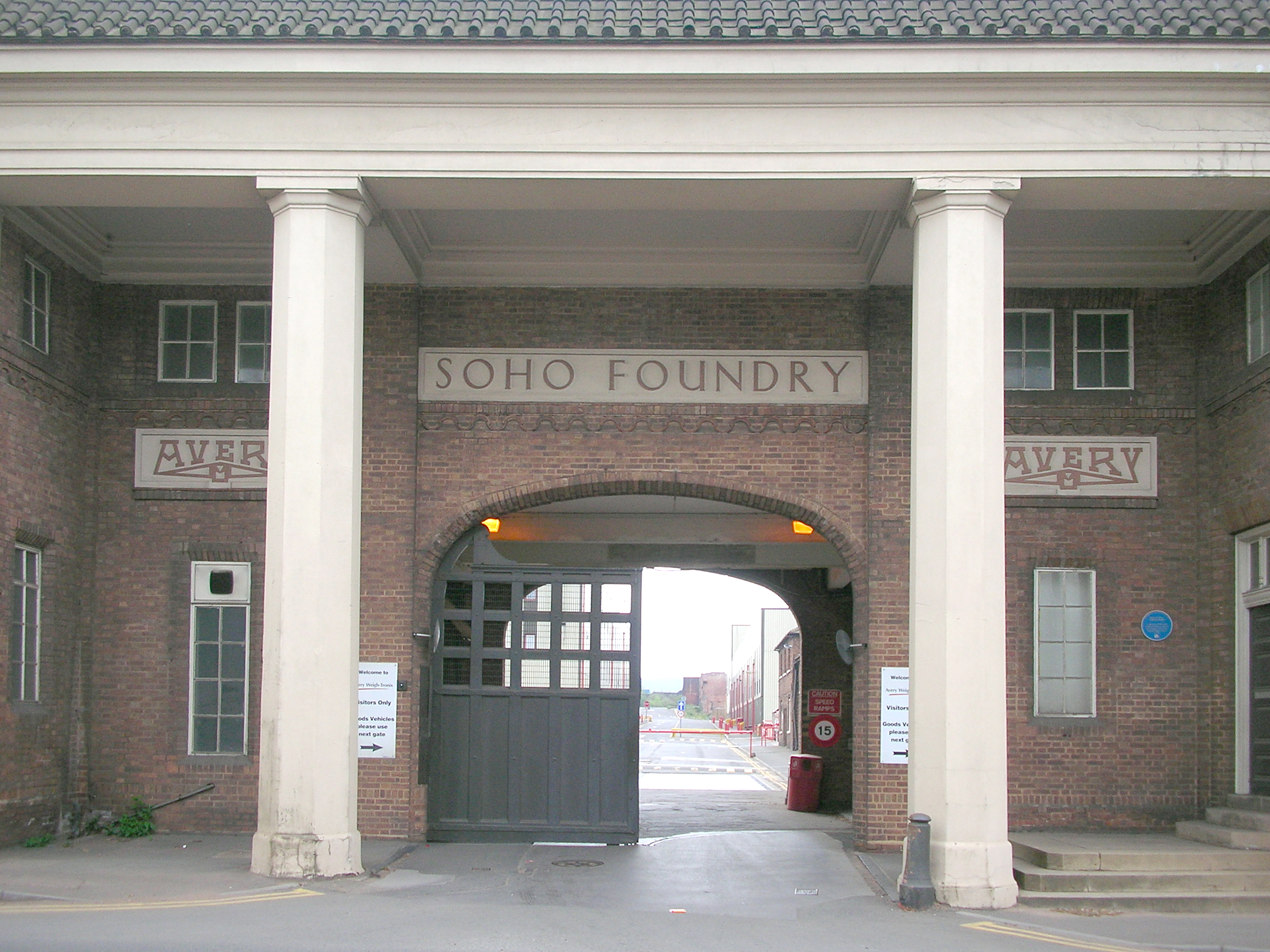
Soho Foundry main gate

The Soho Foundry, opened in 1796 by James Watt and Matthew Boulton, trading as Boulton, Watt & Sons, was built to produce complete steam engines to Watt's designs. Waste dumped from the foundry gave rise to the name Black Patch to the field to the east. The Soho Foundry is now the headquarters of the Avery Company.

The route of the canal, passing through the valley of the Hockley Brook, the boundary with Handsworth on the north side of Smethwick, resulted in most of the heavy industry being located there. The railway was opened in 1852.

One of Smethwick's significant industrial enterprises of the 19th century was the Fox, Henderson Company, formerly Brannah, Fox and Co., which built the steel structure for the Crystal Palace in 1851. At its peak this employed about 2,000 people at the London Works. The bankruptcy and closure of the firm in 1856 had a devastating effect on the local economy. The site of the London Works was later acquired by Chamberlain and Nettlefold, and in 2014 was cleared to build the new Midland Metropolitan University Hospital, amalgamating the Sandwell General Hospital at West Bromwich with the City Hospital, Dudley Road.

Richard Tangye was a notable builder of steam engines in the late 19th century. His designs, in a characteristic green colour, have a distinctive elegance of form. He demolished Smethwick Hall, on the border with Handsworth, and built his factory, the Cornwall Works, on the site.

Mitchells & Butlers opened a brewery on Cape Hill in 1879. It was a local landmark in Smethwick and provided employment in the town for 123 years. However, following a decline in sales and revenue, American owners Coors closed the brewery on 6 December 2002. It was demolished two years later and a 650-home private housing estate was developed on its site.

Charles Carr opened a bell-foundry in the town in 1891, which cast bells for many churches including John's Lane (Dublin), Castle Bromwich Church, Stoke Bliss and Astley, Worcestershire.

Teale & Yates Ltd (Inc. 29 November 1962) was a fish, game and poultry shop which also sold fruit and vegetables. It was on the High Street for many years during the 1960s and 1970s providing good quality fresh food for many local people. The shop was owned by Arthur Teale and his wife Joan, with their eldest son joining the family business in the early 1970s.

The courier company Interlink Express established its head office and national distribution hub in the town in the early 2000s, and is a major employer in the area.

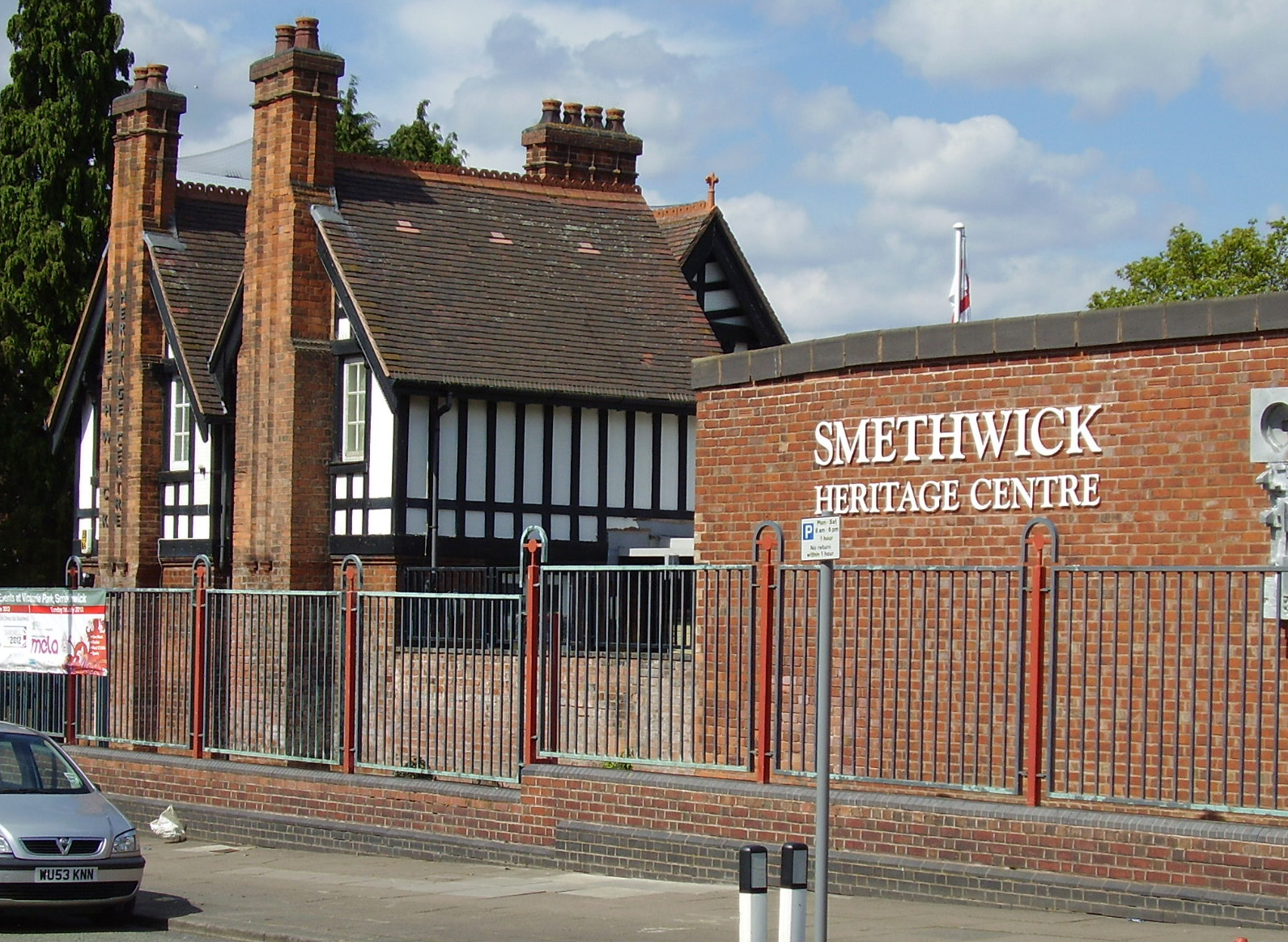
Smethwick Heritage Centre

The Smethwick Heritage Centre museum was opened on 15 September 2004 by Professor Carl Chinn. It maintains a collection of material on Smethwick's industrial and social heritage.

== Education ==
- Abbey Junior and Infants (two sites), Abbey Road, Bearwood
- Annie Lennard Infant School, The Oval, Thimblemill
- Bearwood Primary School, Bearwood Road, Bearwood
  - In 1967, Tony O'Connor was appointed headmaster at what was then Bearwood Junior and Infants School
- Cape Hill Primary School, Cape Hill
- Crocketts Primary School, Coopers Lane, Cape Hill
- Devonshire Primary School, Auckland Road, Uplands
- Galton Valley Primary school
- George Betts Primary School, West End Avenue
- Holly Lodge High School, Holly Lane, West Smethwick
- Ruskin House Pupil Ref. Unit, Holly Lane, West Smethwick
- St Gregory's Roman Catholic Primary School, Park Road
- St Mathew's Church of England School, Windmill Lane
- St Phillip's Catholic Primary, Messenger Road
- Sandwell Academy, Halfords Lane, West Bromwich (built on the sites of Sandwell Secondary Modern and Albion Junior schools)
- Shireland Collegiate Academy, Waterloo Road, Cape Hill
- Shireland Hall Infant and Junior School, Edith Road, Cape Hill
- Smethwick College (part of Sandwell College, now in a new purpose-built building in West Bromwich town centre), Crocketts Lane
- Uplands Manor Primary School, Addenbrooke Road, Uplands
- Victoria Park Primary School, Ballot Street

== Transport ==
=== Road ===
The M5 runs along the western edge of Smethwick, passing over the two canals and a railway near Spon Lane. M5 Junction 1 is accessible at West Bromwich using the A41 road Soho Road. M5 Junction 2 is accessible at Oldbury on the A4123 Wolverhampton Road (Harborne to Wolverhampton) at Birchley Island. Another major road passing through Smethwick is the A456 (Hagley Road) from Birmingham to Halesowen, Kidderminster and Ludlow, which passes through Bearwood, along Lightwoods Park.

=== Buses ===
Local bus service is provided primarily by National Express West Midlands, as well as other operators. Smethwick is on both the Hagley Road (Birmingham, Dudley, Merry Hill, Halesowen and Stourbridge) and Dudley Road (Birmingham, Smethwick, Oldbury and Dudley) bus corridors and the famous Number 11 Birmingham Outer Circle bus routes. There are also direct regular bus services to West Bromwich, Wolverhampton, Oldbury, Blackheath, Harborne, Birmingham University and Dudley. Dudley Road corridor buses provide a bus link to the nearby City Hospital in Winson Green.

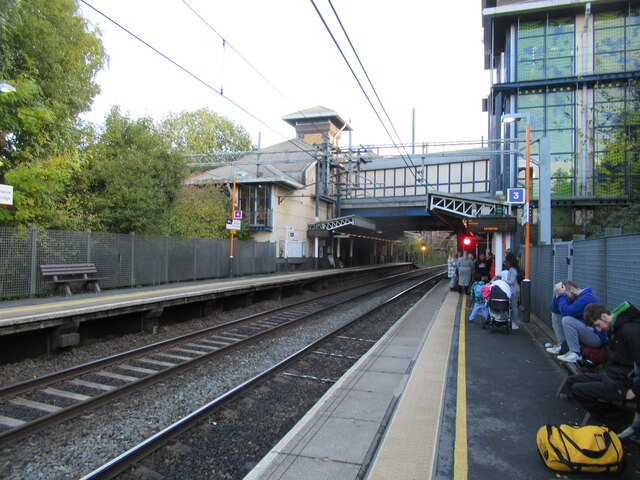
Smethwick Galton Bridge station (low-level platforms)

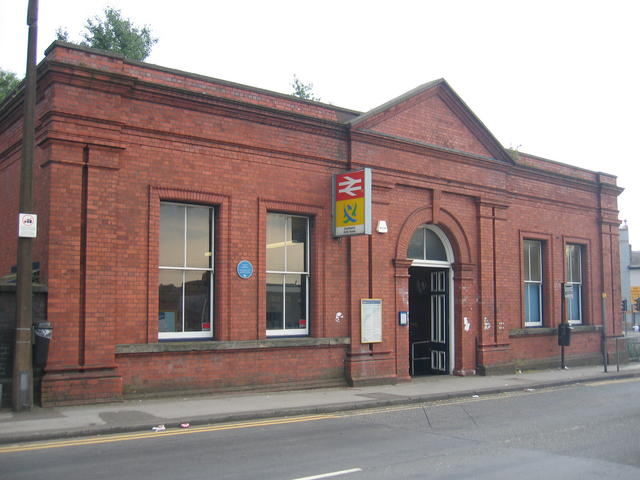
Entrance to Smethwick Rolfe Street station

=== Rail ===
Smethwick has three operational railway stations providing regular local and some long-distance services. All of the stations are currently managed by West Midlands Trains who provide most of the train services. The closest 'intercity' railway stations are either Birmingham New Street or Sandwell & Dudley.

- Smethwick Rolfe Street railway station – Rolfe Street & North Western Road (near the High Street). Located on the Stour Valley Line, it is mainly for local trains between Birmingham New Street, Wolverhampton and Walsall.
- Smethwick Galton Bridge – Oldbury Road. As a bi-level railway station it sits on both the Stour Valley Line and the Jewellery Line. It has the same services as both the Hawthorns and Rolfe Street railway stations, plus it has direct long-distance services to Birmingham International, Shrewsbury, Chester, Northern Wales, Crewe, Liverpool and a limited peak time only direct service to London.
- The Hawthorns – Halfords Lane, close to the West Bromwich football ground. It sits on the Jewellery line just like Smethwick Galton Bridge station but also interchanges with the West Midlands Metro, linking Birmingham and Wolverhampton. The Jewellery Line has regular direct services to Birmingham Snow Hill, Solihull, Stratford-upon-Avon, Stourbridge Junction, Kidderminster and Worcester. Chiltern Railways also provide a limited service direct to London Marylebone.

Handsworth and Smethwick railway station was located on the border of the two areas. It was closed in 1972. Handsworth Booth Street tram stop, opened in 1999, is now located on its site.

=== Air ===
The closest airport to Smethwick is Birmingham, which is around 20 mi (30 km) east at the other side of Birmingham city centre. National Express do provide some long-distance coach services to some London Airports from Bearwood.

- By road the fastest routes are either via the M5, M6 and M42 motorways, or via Birmingham city centre and the A45.
- For travellers by rail there are direct train services from Galton Bridge or from Rolfe Street railway station changing at Birmingham New Street.
- There are no direct bus services from Smethwick to the airport. Passengers would have to travel to Birmingham and change buses. The principal bus service to the airport is the National Express West Midlands 'Limited Stop' express service X1 (Birmingham to Coventry).

== Public services and government ==
Government Smethwick is represented at Sandwell Metropolitan Borough Council by 12 councillors, covering the four wards of Soho & Victoria, St Pauls (which covers up to the Hawthorns ground), Smethwick and Abbey. It is represented in the House of Commons as part of the Warley constituency. It also included Bristnall ward until 2004, when that was transferred to Oldbury 'town'.

Library services There are two public libraries in Smethwick; the larger main library is located on the High Street and a smaller one is located on Thimblemill Road.

Smethwick Swimming Centre

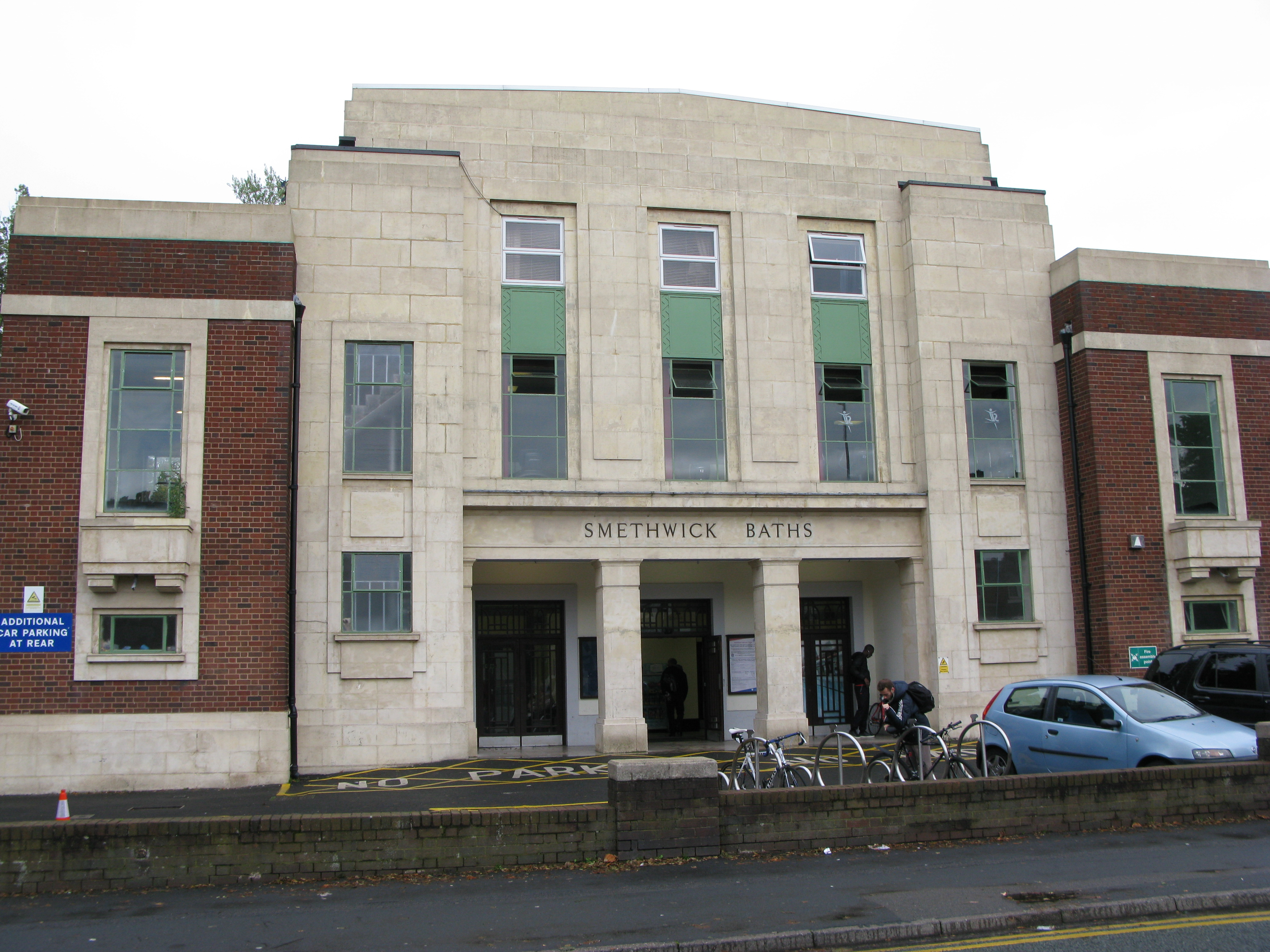
Smethwick Baths

Formerly known as 'Thimblemill Baths', it is a public swimming pool which opened in 1933, located on Thimblemill Road between Gladys Road and Reginald Road in Bearwood. It is a Grade II listed building. There are two pools (a 1933 main pool and a 1968 small pool), gym, dance studio, sauna and steam facilities.

During the Second World War the basement was used as an air raid shelter and a supply depot for the US Air Force who were stationed in Smethwick. The main pool was capable of being covered for the purpose of public events; concerts, galas and exhibitions took place there until the late 1960s. Famous acts including Tommy Cooper, the Beatles, the Rolling Stones, the Who, the Small Faces and the Kinks played at the baths.

Emergency services Policing in Smethwick is provided by the West Midlands Police, who have a police station on Piddock Road just off the High Street. West Midlands Fire Service is responsible for fire and rescue. A fire station is located on Stony Lane a short distance from the High Street. Emergency medical care is provided by the West Midlands Ambulance Service.

Healthcare Smethwick is part of Sandwell and West Birmingham Hospitals NHS Trust. The closest hospital is City Hospital (previously known as Dudley Road Hospital) located in Winson Green. Other local hospitals include Sandwell General Hospital in West Bromwich and Queen Elizabeth Hospital in Selly Oak.

== Sport ==
The town has a semi-professional association football club, Smethwick Rangers. Nicknamed "SR1", the club competes in the 2020–21 season in the West Midlands (Regional) League Premier Division, the 9th tier of the English football league system. Despite representing the town, the team play their home games in Tividale. The Sandwell Aquatics Centre, used in the 2022 Commonwealth Games, is in the Londonderry area.

Smethwick Cricket Club, a founder member of the Birmingham League, is an amateur cricket club in the town.

== Districts ==
See: Districts of Smethwick

- Bearwood
- Black Patch & Soho
- Cape Hill, (including Windmill Lane and French Walls)
- High Street Smethwick (including Victoria Park)
- Londonderry
- North Smethwick (Brasshouse Lane, Albion Estate, Hawthorns, Middlemore Estate)
- The Uplands
- West Smethwick (Including Galton Village)

== Notable residents ==
- Charles Douglas Fox (1843–1921), English civil engineer
- Sydney Barnes (1873–1967), England fast bowler, was born in Smethwick.
- Billy Williams (1876–1929), English professional footballer entirely with West Bromwich Albion
- Harold John Colley (1894–1918), First World War Victoria Cross recipient, born in Smethwick.
- John Davison MP (1870–1927) Smethwick's first Member of Parliament (Labour) was born in Spon Lane.
- Ann George (1903–1989), actress
- Ken Wharton (1916–1957), British racing driver
- Richard Swinburne (born 1934), British philosopher specialising in philosophy of religion, was born in Smethwick.
- Julian Dawes (born 1942), musician, composer
- Christine McVie (1943–2022) musician, songwriter
- Bobby Thomson (1943–2009), English professional footballer
- David Hallam (born 1948), British Labour politician
- Liza Goddard (born 1950), actress, born in Smethwick.
- Julie Walters (born 1950), actress, born in Edgbaston, but spent her early years at 69 Bishopton Road, in the Bearwood area of Smethwick.
- Patrick Cowdell (born 1953), British boxer
- Lee Hughes (born 1976), professional football player

== See also ==
- Black Patch Park
