= County Borough of Warley =

Coordinates: 52.5°N 2.0°W

Warley
- County borough
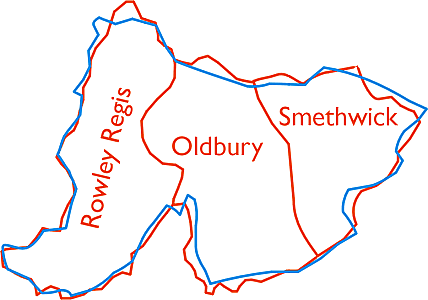
- Map of Warley County Borough
- Area
  - 1966: 3,833 acres (15.51 km^{2})
  - 1974: 3,833 acres (15.51 km^{2})
- Population
  - 1971: 163,545
- History
  - Preceded by: • County Borough of Smethwick • Municipal Borough of Oldbury • Municipal Borough of Rowley Regis
  - Origin: Local Government Act 1958
  - Created: 1966
  - Abolished: 1974
  - Succeeded by: Sandwell
- Status: County borough, Civil parish
- Government
  - HQ: Smethwick Council House, Smethwick
  - Motto: Unity and Progress
- Arms of the County Borough of Warley

Warley was a short-lived county borough and civil parish in the geographical county of Worcestershire, England, forming part of the West Midlands conurbation. It was formed in 1966 by the combination of the existing county borough of Smethwick with the municipal boroughs of Oldbury and Rowley Regis, by recommendation of the Local Government Commission for England. It was abolished just 8 years later in 1974 under the Local Government Act 1972, with its area passing to the Metropolitan Borough of Sandwell.

== Formation ==
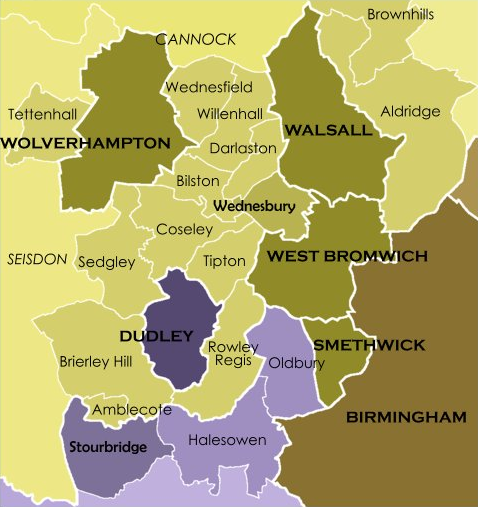
The local government structure within North Worcestershire and South Staffordshire – Prior to the West Midlands Order 1965 reorganisation

The Local Government Act 1958 appointed a Local Government Commission to review administrative structures and boundaries in England outside London. The Act designated a "West Midlands Special Review Area" as one of five conurbations in which urgent reform was felt to be needed. The commission made its report in July 1961, recommending that the Black Country area of the West Midlands should be administered by five large county boroughs. The proposal to merge the boroughs of Oldbury, Rowley Regis and Smethwick as one of the new authorities was initially suggested by the three councils involved. The government announced that it accepted the proposals in November 1962, and it was originally intended that the County Borough of Warley should come into being on 1 April 1964. The reforms were delayed when five district councils in the review area took legal action in an attempt to prevent their implementation. The legal process was finally concluded in the Court of Appeal in July 1965, with the court ruling in the government's favour. Plans for Rowley Regis to be absorbed into an expanded Dudley borough were also considered, while Halesowen was being lined up as the third area to be absorbed into a new borough which also included Oldbury and Smethwick, but this did not happen and the borough of Halesowen survived until it was incorporated into the new Metropolitan Borough of Dudley in 1974.

The Local Government (West Midlands) Order 1965 was made on 3 November 1965, with the changes to come into effect on 1 April 1966. The Order was debated in the House of Commons on 2 December 1965. John Horner, the Labour MP for Oldbury and Halesowen stated that while the boroughs of Oldbury and Rowley Regis had supported the creation of the new county borough in 1961, they no longer did so. In contrast, Peter Griffiths, Conservative member for Smethwick stated that the working party consisting of councillors for the three boroughs had given up their opposition, and were trying to make a success of the new county borough. The group did, however, have objections to boundary changes which caused the transfer of an estate of council houses (next to the West Bromwich Albion F.C. stadium) to West Bromwich.

The borough took its name from the ancient Manor of Warley, listed in the Domesday Survey as covering much of the area. This was subsequently divided into two parts: Warley Salop (in Shropshire) and Warley Wigorn (in Worcestershire). This was united as the civil parish of Warley in 1884, but later divided between the boroughs of Oldbury and Smethwick (Warley Woods).

Smethwick and Rowley Regis had been part of Staffordshire, while Oldbury was part of Worcestershire (having been transferred from Shropshire in 1844). The new county borough was placed entirely in the geographical county of Worcestershire. Part of the Oakham area of Dudley and most of the Tividale area of Tipton were also incorporated into Warley, becoming part of the new Oldbury B69 postal district.

The archives for Warley Borough are held at Sandwell Community History and Archives Service.

=== Areas transferred ===
Existing local authority	Area (acres)	Population 1961	Notes
Rowley Regis MB, Staffordshire	1,483	47,831	Remainder of borough was divided between West Bromwich CB (44 acres, pop 43) and Halesowen MB (2 acres, pop 150)
Oldbury MB, Worcestershire	1,231	51,902	Remainder of borough was divided between West Bromwich CB (11 acres, pop 43) and Halesowen MB (95 acres, pop 2,003)
Smethwick CB	988	67,501	Remainder of borough was divided between West Bromwich CB (20 acres, pop 889) and Birmingham CB (3 acres, pop 0)
Birmingham CB	50	1,820	
Halesowen MB, Worcestershire	37	525	
West Bromwich CB	32	169	
Dudley CB	10	317	
Tipton MB, Staffordshire	1	95	Borough was abolished, the remainder becoming part of West Bromwich CB with the exception of a small section being incorporated into Dudley CB
Brierley Hill UD, Staffordshire	1	0	Urban District was abolished, most going to Dudley CB

Source:Vision of Britain

On creation, the county borough was included in the area of the West Midlands Constabulary, which was formed to cover the five Black Country county boroughs formed in 1966. Warley was included in the area of the West Midlands Passenger Transport Executive in 1969, and nominated one member of the transport authority.

== Borough council ==
The first elections to Warley Borough Council were in February 1966, with those elected being a "shadow council" until coming into full powers on 1 April. The Labour Party initially held power, losing it to the Conservatives in 1968. Labour regained control in 1972 at the final borough election before abolition. The county borough was divided into fifteen wards, each returning three councillors and one alderman:

- Abbey
- Bearwood
- Brandhall
- Bristnall
- Cradley Heath
- Langley
- Old Hill and Blackheath
- Rounds Green
- Rowley
- St Paul's
- Sandwell
- Soho
- Tividale
- Uplands
- Victoria

The political composition of the borough council was as follows following each election from 1967 to 1972:

Year	Labour	Conservative	Liberal	Independent
1967	31	26	1	2
1968	17	39	1	3
1969	10	47	1	2
1970	17	41	1	0
1971	26	32	1	1
1972	39	21	0	0

In 1967, the first council elections in Warley saw the Labour Party gain control of the council with a narrow majority, although the following year saw the Conservatives gain control with a significant majority, reflecting the slump in popularity of the Labour government across Britain at the time. In 1972, Labour regained control of Warley.

In September 1967, the council appointed Tony O'Connor as headmaster at what was then Bearwood Junior and Infants School; he is widely held to be the UK's first black headmaster.

=== Coat of arms ===
On 30 June 1966, the College of Arms granted the new county borough armorial bearings. The design incorporated features from the arms of the three merged boroughs. The blazon of the arms was as follows:

Per saltire vert and or, two lions rampant in pale or, in fess of either flank a club in bend sinister surmounted by a caduceus in bend proper; on a chief or a lion passant vert. And for a crest: Issuant from a Saxon crown or, a demi lion rampant double queued vert holding with the dexter paw an arrow barb downwards proper. Supporters: on the dexter side a lion gules in the mouth an arrow proper; on the sinister side a dragon gules in the mouth an anchor or.

The "chief" or upper third of the shield bearing a lion passant came from the arms of Rowley Regis, and the "per saltire" division of the arms and green and gold colouring was found in Oldbury's insignia. The gold lions on a green background were from the arms of the Robsart family, while the crossed club and caduceus were the arms of James Watt. The crest featured a Saxon crown from which rose a green double-tailed lion, emblem of the Suttons, mediaeval lords of Dudley. The lion held an arrow from the arms of Matthew Boulton. The supporters of the arms were a red lion and dragon. The lion was from the armorial bearings of Sir James Timmins Chance, while the dragon was intended to represent the ancient Britons, founders of the "old burh" or Oldbury. Both animals held objects in their mouths as heraldic differences: an arrow (as in the crest) and an anchor (for Cradley Heath's traditional industry). The motto chosen by the borough was "Unity and Progress".

== Parliamentary constituencies ==
The Parliamentary Constituencies (England) Order 1970 divided the county borough into two parliamentary constituencies: Warley East and Warley West. The constituencies were first used at the 1974 general election, shortly before the abolition of the borough. They were abolished in 1997, although the borough's name lived on until 2024 as the name of Warley constituency which consisted of Oldbury and Smethwick (formerly Warley East). The old Warley West seat was divided between the new constituency of Halesowen and Rowley Regis and an expanded West Bromwich West.

== Abolition ==
On the formation of the West Midlands metropolitan county in 1974, the county borough of Warley merged with the county borough of West Bromwich to form the Metropolitan Borough of Sandwell. West Bromwich itself had expanded in 1966 to take in the bulk of Tipton and Wednesbury.
