= Tony O'Connor (teacher) =

- Born: 1921 or 1922; Jamaica
- Alma mater: University of Birmingham
- Occupation: School teacher, head teacher (1967–1983)
- Branch: Royal Air Force

Tony O'Connor (born 1921 or 1922) was a British West Indies teacher (Jamaica 1962 Onwards). His 1967 appointment as a headteacher in Smethwick England—he was the first black person to hold such a post—caused a racist backlash.

== Early life ==
O'Connor was born in British West Indies (Jamaica) in 1921 or 1922 (Note: One source says 1918.). He joined the RAF in 1943, during World War II, achieving the rank of flight sergeant and moving to the United Kingdom.

== Career ==
After the war, O'Connor took a teaching diploma at the University of Birmingham, then worked as a teacher, serving at two schools in Smethwick, including three years as deputy head at Albion School. He specialised in the Nuffield method of teaching mathematics, and trained other teachers in its use.

In September 1967, he was appointed head teacher at Bearwood Road Junior and Infants School (Note: Now Bearwood Primary School; some sources refer to it as such; Bearwood is the southern part of Smethwick, in Sandwell, West Midlands, but in 1967 was part of the County Borough of Warley, in Worcestershire.) in Smethwick, a town which had recently experienced racial tensions. He is widely held to have been the first black person to be a head teacher in the United Kingdom. He was reported as saying that he did not care if he was the "first, second, third or 250th West Indian headmaster". In December 1967, days after his appointment became public, racist slogans, 2 feet 6 inches (0.76 metres) high, and swastikas were painted on the walls of the school, and threats were made against him.

== Personal life ==
At the time of his Bearwood appointment, O'Connor was living at Hall Green, Birmingham. His wife Marjorie was also a teacher. They had two daughters. Because of the racist threats directed at him, their daughters had to stay with relatives.

He retired in 1983.

== Legacy ==
A quote by O'Connor featured in a calligraphic artwork by the artist Linett Kamala, which was included in her 2018-2019 "Excellence – A Celebration of Pioneering Headteachers" exhibition at the University of Roehampton, commemorating black head teachers.

Among O'Connor's pupils at Smethwick was Doreen Foster, subsequently director of Warwick Arts Centre.

Papers relating to O'Connor's headmastership are held by Sandwell Archives.
