= Londonderry, West Midlands =

Suburb of Smethwick, West Midlands

Coordinates: 52.4881°N 1.9921°W

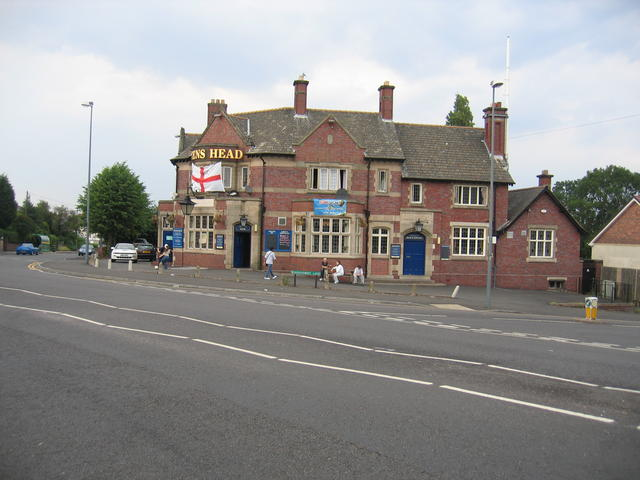
The Queen's Head, Londonderry, in 2006

Londonderry is a residential area of Oldbury and Smethwick, on the B4182 road, in the Sandwell Metropolitan Borough, in the English county of West Midlands. Londonderry (commonly referred to as Queen's Head due to the pub of the same name) features a small commercial area, with a post office, the former Queen's Head public house, and a number of small shops and takeaway restaurants. Not far away, on the corner of Basons Lane and Victoria Road, stood the public house, The Londonderry, until its closing and demolition in 2009. In 2016 construction began to renovate The Queen's Head pub into a private veterinary clinic. A church and a playing field are also in the area and West Smethwick Park is nearby. The Sandwell Aquatics Centre off Londonderry Lane hosted swimming and diving for the 2022 Commonwealth Games.
