= Harold John Colley =

English Victoria Cross recipient (1895-1918)

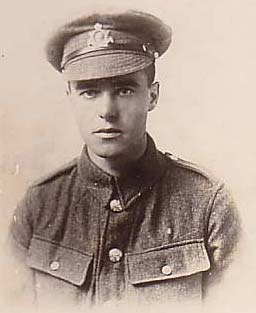
- Born: 26 May 1895; Birmingham, Warwickshire, England
- Died: 25 August 1918 (aged 23); Martinpuich, France
- Burial place: Mailly Wood Cemetery, Mailly-Maillet, France
- Military career
- Allegiance: United Kingdom
- Branch: British Army
- Rank: Serjeant
- Units: Duke of Cornwall's Light Infantry; The Lancashire Fusiliers
- Conflicts: World War I
- Awards: Victoria Cross; Military Medal

Harold John Colley VC MM (26 May 1895 – 25 August 1918) was an English recipient of the Victoria Cross, the highest and most prestigious award for gallantry in the face of the enemy that can be awarded to British and Commonwealth forces.

== Early life ==
He was born at 60 Winson Street in the Soho district of Birmingham, England. The family moved to nearby Smethwick sometime prior to the 1911 Census, where they can be found at 74 Cheshire Road. This remained his home address during the First World War,

== Military career ==
Colley was 24 years old, and an acting sergeant in the 10th Battalion, The Lancashire Fusiliers, British Army during the First World War when the following deed took place for which he was awarded the VC.

On 25 August 1918 at Martinpuich, France, during a strong counter-attack Sergeant Colley's company was holding an advanced position with two platoons in advance and two in support. The forward platoons were ordered to hold on at all costs and Sergeant Colley went, without orders, to help these two platoons. He rallied the men, then formed a defensive flank and held it, although out of the two platoons only three men remained unwounded and the sergeant himself was dangerously wounded and died the same day. It was entirely due to his action that the enemy was prevented from breaking through.

== Legacy ==
His Victoria Cross is displayed at the Fusilier Museum, Bury, Lancashire. Colley is the subject of a bronze memorial plaque in the vestibule of Smethwick Council House, as well as being included in the list of names on the memorials at Bearwood Baptist Church and St. Mary's Church - both in Bearwood. On 25 August 2018, the centenary of his death, a commemorative paving stone in his honour was unveiled in Smethwick.

== Bibliography ==
- Gliddon, Gerald (2014) [2002]. Road to Victory 1918. VCs of the First World War. The History Press. ISBN 978-0750953610.
