= Districts of Smethwick =

Smethwick is a town in the Metropolitan Borough of Sandwell, in the West Midlands of England.

== Bearwood ==
The area is centered on Bearwood Road; one of Smethwick’s shopping areas. Bearwood Bus Station is at the end of Bearwood Road and the corner of Hagley Road. Next to it is Lightwoods Park, on the border with Birmingham. Heading towards Cape Hill is Hadley Stadium. Warley Woods, a scheduled protected public open space is to the west of Bearwood on Abbey Road.

== Black Patch and Soho ==
The area is centered on Black Patch Park and Soho Railway Junction, which is an imposing structure to the south. Soho is home to a Train Care Depot and the Soho Foundry, which was Matthew Boulton and James Watt’s famous factory, Most of the rest of the area is industrial with some housing.

== Cape Hill, Victoria Park, and Windmill Lane ==
It is centred on the road of the same name and includes the adjoining streets. This is Smethwick’s busiest shopping area and home to Asda and the Indoor Market. This is the former home of The Mitchells & Butler Brewery, which was demolished and replaced by housing. Most of the rest of the area is housing. Victoria Park is located at the High Street end. Windmill Lane Housing Estate is to the West of Cape Hill.

Victoria Park, Smethwick, is the main formal garden for the town of Smethwick and has a Green Flag award. In 2010 the park was the subject of considerable investment and regeneration including a new bandstand. A flagship Adidas outdoor gym kit along with additional gym stations has also been installed.

The park occupies 14 ha. (around 34 acres) and is situated just off Smethwick High Street next to the Council House the park provides a range of facilities including a play area and multi-use games area. A flagship CCTV system and path lighting has been installed in January 2009. This provides a 24-hour monitoring system approved by the Victoria Park Smethwick Committee established in 2008. Victoria Park Lodge, the former park keeper's house, is now home to the Smethwick Heritage Centre

== West Smethwick including Galton Village ==
West Smethwick is home to West Smethwick Park and housing running to Spon Lane and the Oldbury border and also along St Pauls Road bordering Smethwick High Street and the along Oldbury Road including Galton Village. The new housing opposite West Smethwick Park used to be occupied by a Neurological and former infections diseases hospital. A small graveyard for this can still be seen on Holly Lane. West Smethwick is also home to what is now known as West Cross shopping centre on the Oldbury Road, Oldbury Cemetery and part industrial including the old Chance's Glass factory bordering Oldbury and West Bromwich.

Galton Village is a housing estate next to Smethwick Galton Bridge railway station along the Oldbury Road towards Oldbury and West Bromwich.

== High Street Smethwick ==
The High Street used to be Smethwick’s main shopping and commerce centre until Toll House Way was built, demolishing half of the High Street on the railway side. It is home to the Job Centre Plus, Royal Mail sorting office and the Guru Nanak Gurdwara (Sikh Temple). Both Smethwick railway stations are located here. Rolfe St is located opposite the Holy Trinity Church and Galton Bridge is at the start of the Oldbury Road. Smethwick West was closed in 1995 and is located next to Galton Bridge Station. Smethwick Council House is located at the Victoria Park end, not far from Smethwick Police Station (in Piddock Road) and the site of the former technical college.

== Londonderry ==
This area, mostly made up of housing, runs along Smethwick’s border with Oldbury. Londonderry (also known as the Queen's Head locally) is home to a small shopping area located on Londonderry Lane, including a post office. Manor Lane has an allotment and another small park. The area borders West Smethwick, Rood End and Langley (Oldbury).

== Rabone Lane and Middlemore Industrial Park ==
An industrial area located just west of Black Patch and north of the High Street. The Smethwick Canal Heritage Centre was located on Brasshouse Lane. On Halford's Lane is The Hawthorns Railway Station and West Bromwich Albion Football Club. Bridge Street, former home of the Smethwick Engine (now in the Think Tank, Birmingham), is off Rolfe Street past the railway station.

== Uplands ==
The Uplands is primarily a residential area, centred on The Uplands (Road) and located between Bearwood and the High Street. The area around the Uplands proper and heading towards the High Street is made up of mainly terraced housing built around 1900, with the Bearwood side being of more modern construction. Among Smethwick’s oldest buildings, The Old Church and associated Old Chapel public house are located at the Church Road end of the Uplands. Historically, the area that now comprises The Uplands was known as "Bosom's End". The area was almost entirely farmland and is referenced in the Census of 1841.

Other landmarks include: Smethwick Hall Park, The Akril Methodist Church building (now a Sikh temple), Harry Mitchell Leisure Centre & Park, the Dorothy Parks Centre and Smethwick Cricket Club. Uplands Manor School and the cemetery are located a little to the north of the Old Church on Church Road. Besides the Old Chapel Pub, the area is home to the Hollybush Public House and a number of social clubs.
