= Smethwick in the 1964 general election =

Racial controversy in UK constituency

- 15 October 1964

Smethwick constituency
- Turnout: 74.1% (▼1.8 pp)
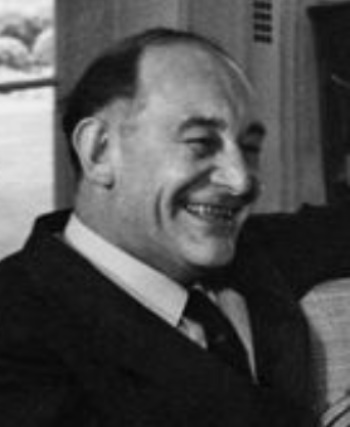
	First party	Second party	Third party
Candidate	Peter Griffiths	Patrick Gordon Walker	David Hugill
Party	Conservative	Labour	Liberal
Popular vote	16,690	14,916	3,172
Percentage	47.6%	42.6%	9.0%
Swing	▲2.3 pp	▼12.1 pp	Steady

The constituency of Smethwick in the West Midlands of England gained national media coverage at the 1964 general election, when Peter Griffiths of the Conservative Party gained the seat against the national trend, amidst controversy concerning racism.

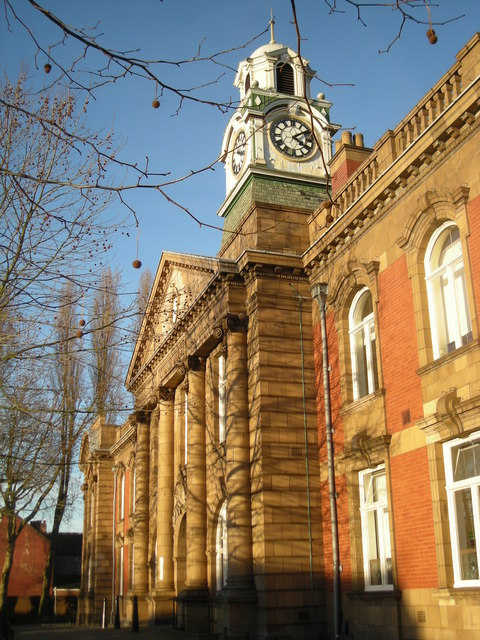
Smethwick Council House, where the result was announced

== Background ==
Following the Second World War, Smethwick attracted a significant number of immigrants from Commonwealth countries, the largest ethnic group being Sikhs from the Punjab in India. There was also a background of factory closures, and a growing waiting list for local council housing. Griffiths ran a campaign critical of both the opposition and the government's immigration policies.

Labour activists claimed that supporters of the Conservative candidate had used the slogan "if you want a nigger for a neighbour, vote Labour", but Colin Jordan, leader of the neo-Nazi British Movement, claimed that his members had produced the initial slogan, as well as spread the poster and sticker campaign; Jordan's group in the past had also campaigned on other slogans, such as: "Don't vote – a vote for Tory, Labour or Liberal is a vote for more blacks!". Griffiths denied that the slogan was racist, saying:

I should think that is a manifestation of the popular feeling. I would not condemn anyone who said that. I would say that is how people see the situation in Smethwick. I fully understand the feelings of the people who say it. I would say it is exasperation, not fascism.

— quoted in The Times

== Election result ==
The 1964 general election had involved a nationwide swing from the Conservatives to the Labour Party, which had resulted in the latter party gaining a narrow five seat majority. However, in Smethwick, the Conservative candidate, Griffiths gained the seat and unseated the sitting Labour MP, Patrick Gordon Walker, who had served as Shadow Foreign Secretary for the eighteen months prior to the election. Griffiths polled at a slightly higher % than when he stood for the Smethwick constituency in 1959:

General election 1964: Smethwick
Party	Candidate	Votes	%	±%
Conservative	Peter Griffiths	16,690	47.6	+2.3
Labour	Patrick Gordon Walker	14,916	42.6	−12.1
Liberal	David Hugill	3,172	9.0	N/A
Independent	Dudley Trevor Davies	262	0.8	N/A
Majority		1,774	5.1	
Turnout		35,040	74.1	−1.8
Conservative gain from Labour		Swing	−7.2	

Figures nevertheless show that votes for Labour's Patrick Gordon Walker had been in decline from the 1950 general election onwards, culminating in this 1964 defeat by Peter Griffiths (see Smethwick (UK Parliament constituency) for details).

== Aftermath ==
Following the election result, a British branch of the Ku Klux Klan was formed, and black and ethnic minority residents in the area had burning crosses put through their letterboxes. Peter Griffiths was declared "a parliamentary leper" by Harold Wilson, the new Labour Prime Minister. Griffiths, in his maiden speech to the Commons, pointed out what he believed were the real problems his constituency faced, including factory closures and over 4,000 families awaiting council accommodation.

Malcolm X visited Marshall Street in Smethwick to show solidarity with the black and Asian communities in the area. Nine days later, he was shot dead in New York. Malcolm X visited Marshall Street because of an official policy of racial segregation had been attempted to be put into place in Smethwick's housing allocation, with houses on Marshall Street in Smethwick being let only to white British residents. In 1964, a delegation of white residents petitioned the Conservative council to compulsorily purchase vacant houses to prevent non-whites from buying the houses. The policy was adopted by the council but was prevented by Labour housing minister Richard Crossman, who refused to allow the council to borrow the money in order to enact their policy.

Patrick Gordon Walker subsequently lost the 1965 Leyton by-election, in a usually safe Labour seat.

Labour regained Smethwick at the 1966 general election, when former actor Andrew Faulds became the new Member of Parliament.

== See also ==
- Racism in the UK Conservative Party
