= Smethwick (constituency) =

UK Parliament constituency (1918–1974, 2024 onwards)

Coordinates: 52°29′N 2°0′W

- Borough constituency for the House of Commons
- Boundaries since 2024
- Boundary of Smethwick in West Midlands region
- County: West Midlands
- Electorate: 71,195 (2023)
- Major settlements: Smethwick, Brandhall, Langley Green, Blackheath

Current constituency
- Created: 2024
- Member of Parliament: Gurinder Josan (Labour)
- Seats: One
- Created from: Warley

1918–1974
- Seats: One
- Created from: Handsworth
- Replaced by: Warley East

Smethwick is a parliamentary constituency, centred on the town of Smethwick in the Metropolitan Borough of Sandwell. It returns one Member of Parliament (MP) to the House of Commons of the Parliament of the United Kingdom, elected by the first past the post voting system. The constituency was created for the 1918 general election, abolished for the February 1974 general election, and re-established for the 2024 general election, when it was formed from the abolished Warley constituency, with the addition of most of the Blackheath ward. It is currently represented by Gurinder Josan of the Labour Party.

== Constituency profile ==
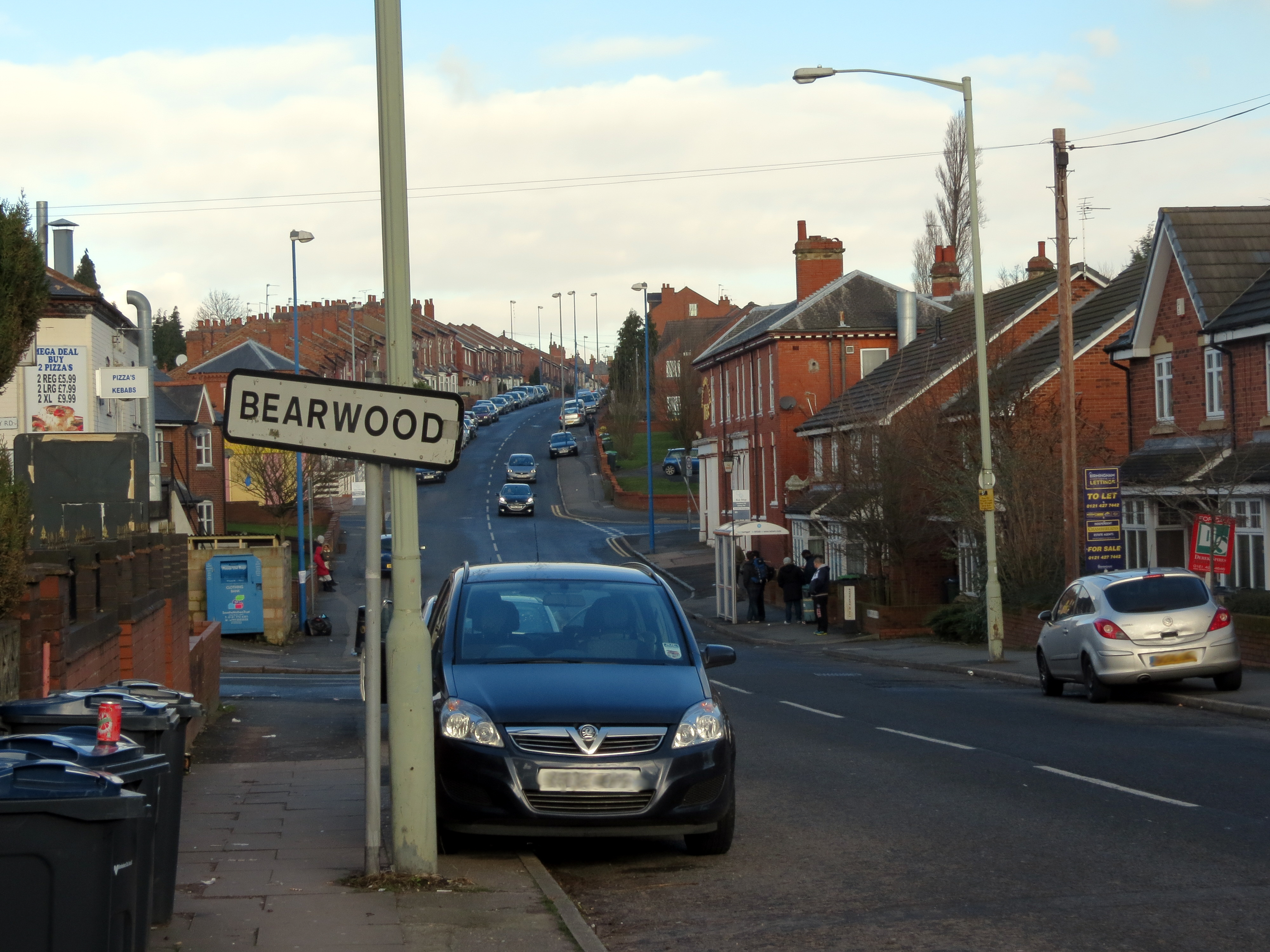
Shireland Road, Smethwick

Smethwick is a constituency in the West Midlands county of England, within the borough of Sandwell. It covers the towns of Smethwick and Blackheath and the residential areas of Warley and Brandhall.

This is an urban constituency covering towns and suburbs around 4 miles (6.4 km) west of the centre of Birmingham. Smethwick is an industrial town generally considered part of the Black Country, a region of connected towns and villages between Birmingham and Wolverhampton associated with coal mining, steelmaking and the birth of the Industrial Revolution. Smethwick and Blackheath are highly-deprived with most residents living in dense flats or terraces, many of which are socially rented. Brandhall is wealthier and more suburban in character with mostly interwar-period semi-detached properties. House prices across the constituency are generally lower than the rest of the West Midlands region and considerably lower than the UK average.

Residents of Smethwick are younger than average with a low retired population. They have low levels of income and homeownership and the child poverty rate is double the nationwide figure. Residents have low levels of education and a high proportion work in the retail, education and transport sectors. The percentage claiming unemployment benefits is nearly double the overall UK rate.

The Smethwick constituency is ethnically diverse. White people made up 47% of the population at the 2021 census. Asians were the largest ethnic minority group at 31%, mostly of Indian or Pakistani origin and largely concentrated in Smethwick town where they made up a majority of residents. Most of the Asian population were Muslims, although Smethwick contains one of the country's largest Sikh communities, who made up 13% of the constituency's population. Black people were 11% of residents.

At the local borough council, Smethwick town is mostly represented by the Labour Party whilst the west of the constituency (Blackheath and Brandhall) elected primarily Reform UK councillors. Voters in this constituency strongly supported leaving the European Union in the 2016 referendum; an estimated 61% voted in favour of Brexit compared to the UK-wide figure of 52%.

== Boundaries ==
=== 1918–1974 ===
The County Borough of Smethwick.

=== 2024–present ===
The re-established constituency is composed of the following (as they existed on 1 December 2020):

- The Metropolitan Borough of Sandwell wards of: Abbey; Blackheath (polling districts BLA, BLB, BLC, BLD, BLE, BLF and BLH); Bristnall; Langley; Old Warley; St. Pauls; Smethwick; Soho and Victoria.

It comprises the whole of the former Warley constituency, with the addition of the bulk of the Blackheath ward from the abolished constituency of Halesowen and Rowley Regis, thus bringing its electorate within the permitted range.

== History ==
The constituency gained national interest during the 1918 general election when the Suffragette leader Christabel Pankhurst decided to stand as a Woman's Party candidate supporting the Coalition. She was one of 17 women candidates standing for Parliament at the first opportunity. This was her one and only parliamentary campaign which she lost to the Labour candidate.

In 1945 the constituency held the first post-war by-election when the winning Labour candidate, Alfred Dobbs, was killed in a road traffic accident less than twenty four hours after the count. The constituency was the subject of national media coverage during the 1964 general election when Peter Griffiths, the Conservative Party candidate, gained the seat against the national trend, unseating the Labour Party sitting member, Patrick Gordon Walker, a front bench opposition spokesman in the previous Parliament, in a campaign with racial overtones.

In 1966, 6.5% of the constituency was born in the New Commonwealth.

== Members of Parliament ==
=== MPs 1888–1999 ===
| Election | Member | Party |
|---|---|---|
| 1918 | John Davison | Labour |
| 1926 by-election | Sir Oswald Mosley | Labour |
| 1931 | Sir Oswald Mosley | New Party |
| 1931 | Roy Wise | Conservative |
| 1945 | Alfred Dobbs | Labour |
| 1945 | Patrick Gordon Walker | Labour |
| 1964 | Peter Griffiths | Conservative |
| 1966 | Andrew Faulds | Labour |
| Feb 1974 | constituency abolished: see Warley East | |

=== MPs since 2024 ===
Warley prior to 2024

| Election | Member | Party |
|---|---|---|
| 2024 | Gurinder Josan | Labour |

== Elections ==
=== Elections in the 2020s ===
General election 2024: Smethwick
| Party | Candidate | Votes | % | ±% |
|---|---|---|---|---|
| Labour | Gurinder Josan | 16,858 | 48.0 | −9.0 |
| Reform | Pete Durnell | 5,670 | 16.1 | +10.1 |
| Conservative | Kate Fairhurst | 4,546 | 12.9 | −17.3 |
| Green | Rod MacRorie | 2,741 | 7.8 | +5.5 |
| Workers Party | Nahim Rubani | 2,449 | 7.0 | N/A |
| Independent | Jay Anandou | 1,322 | 3.8 | N/A |
| Liberal Democrats | Oliver Patrick | 1,018 | 2.9 | −1.6 |
| Independent | Christopher Graham | 348 | 1.0 | N/A |
| TUSC | Ravaldeep Bath | 163 | 0.5 | N/A |
| Majority | | 11,188 | 31.9 | |
| Turnout | | 35,115 | 48.2 | −9.3 |
| Labour hold | | Swing | | |

=== Elections in the 1970s ===
General election 1970: Smethwick
| Party | Candidate | Votes | % | ±% |
|---|---|---|---|---|
| Labour | Andrew Faulds | 16,077 | 52.2 | −2.2 |
| Conservative | Brian Rathbone | 13,968 | 45.4 | +1.3 |
| Liberal | Mihir Gupta | 747 | 2.4 | New |
| Majority | | 2,109 | 6.8 | −3.5 |
| Turnout | | 30,792 | 68.1 | −7.3 |
| Labour hold | | Swing | -1.7 | |

=== Elections in the 1960s ===
General election 1966: Smethwick
| Party | Candidate | Votes | % | ±% |
|---|---|---|---|---|
| Labour | Andrew Faulds | 18,440 | 54.4 | +11.8 |
| Conservative | Peter Griffiths | 14,950 | 44.1 | −3.5 |
| British National | R. Stanley | 508 | 1.5 | New |
| Majority | | 3,490 | 10.3 | N/A |
| Turnout | | 33,898 | 75.4 | +1.3 |
| Labour gain from Conservative | | Swing | −7.6 | |

General election 1964: Smethwick
| Party | Candidate | Votes | % | ±% |
|---|---|---|---|---|
| Conservative | Peter Griffiths | 16,690 | 47.6 | +2.3 |
| Labour | Patrick Gordon Walker | 14,916 | 42.6 | −12.1 |
| Liberal | David Hugill | 3,172 | 9.0 | New |
| Independent | Dudley Trevor Davies | 262 | 0.8 | New |
| Majority | | 1,774 | 5.0 | N/A |
| Turnout | | 35,040 | 74.1 | −1.8 |
| Conservative gain from Labour | | Swing | −7.2 | |

=== Elections in the 1950s ===
General election 1959: Smethwick
| Party | Candidate | Votes | % | ±% |
|---|---|---|---|---|
| Labour | Patrick Gordon Walker | 20,670 | 54.7 | −3.5 |
| Conservative | Peter Griffiths | 17,126 | 45.3 | +3.5 |
| Majority | | 3,544 | 9.4 | −7.0 |
| Turnout | | 37,796 | 75.9 | +0.4 |
| Labour hold | | Swing | -3.5 | |

General election 1955: Smethwick
| Party | Candidate | Votes | % | ±% |
|---|---|---|---|---|
| Labour | Patrick Gordon Walker | 23,151 | 58.2 | −2.4 |
| Conservative | John Wells | 16,656 | 41.8 | +2.4 |
| Majority | | 6,495 | 16.4 | −4.8 |
| Turnout | | 39,807 | 75.5 | −8.5 |
| Labour hold | | Swing | -2.5 | |

General election 1951: Smethwick
| Party | Candidate | Votes | % | ±% |
|---|---|---|---|---|
| Labour | Patrick Gordon Walker | 27,739 | 60.6 | −1.5 |
| Conservative | A. Norman Giles | 18,012 | 39.4 | +1.5 |
| Majority | | 9,727 | 21.2 | −3.0 |
| Turnout | | 45,751 | 83.5 | −3.4 |
| Labour hold | | Swing | -1.5 | |

General election 1950: Smethwick
| Party | Candidate | Votes | % | ±% |
|---|---|---|---|---|
| Labour | Patrick Gordon Walker | 28,750 | 62.1 | −6.7 |
| Conservative | J. Fallon | 17,553 | 37.9 | +6.7 |
| Majority | | 11,197 | 24.2 | −13.4 |
| Turnout | | 46,303 | 86.9 | +21.5 |
| Labour hold | | Swing | -6.7 | |

=== Elections in the 1940s ===
1945 Smethwick by-election
| Party | Candidate | Votes | % | ±% |
|---|---|---|---|---|
| Labour | Patrick Gordon Walker | 19,364 | 68.8 | +2.9 |
| Conservative | Gilbert Harold Samuel Edgar | 8,762 | 31.2 | −2.9 |
| Majority | | 10,602 | 37.6 | +5.8 |
| Turnout | | 43,020 | 65.4 | −7.0 |
| Labour hold | | Swing | −2.9 | |

General election 1945: Smethwick
| Party | Candidate | Votes | % | ±% |
|---|---|---|---|---|
| Labour | Alfred Dobbs | 20,522 | 65.9 | +18.4 |
| Conservative | Gilbert Harold Samuel Edgar | 10,637 | 34.1 | −18.4 |
| Majority | | 9,885 | 31.8 | N/A |
| Turnout | | 31,159 | 72.4 | +1.7 |
| Labour gain from Conservative | | Swing | −18.4 | |

=== Elections in the 1930s ===
General election 1935: Smethwick
| Party | Candidate | Votes | % | ±% |
|---|---|---|---|---|
| Conservative | Roy Wise | 16,575 | 52.5 | −7.6 |
| Labour | Charles Wortham Brook | 15,023 | 47.5 | +7.6 |
| Majority | | 1,552 | 5.0 | −17.2 |
| Turnout | | 31,598 | 70.7 | −4.0 |
| Conservative hold | | Swing | −7.7 | |

General election 1931: Smethwick
| Party | Candidate | Votes | % | ±% |
|---|---|---|---|---|
| Conservative | Roy Wise | 20,945 | 60.1 | +25.9 |
| Labour | W. Ernest Lawrence | 13,927 | 39.9 | −14.9 |
| Majority | | 7,018 | 20.2 | N/A |
| Turnout | | 34,872 | 74.7 | −4.2 |
| Conservative gain from Labour | | Swing | +20.3 | |

=== Elections in the 1920s ===
General election 1929: Smethwick
| Party | Candidate | Votes | % | ±% |
|---|---|---|---|---|
| Labour | Oswald Mosley | 19,550 | 54.8 | −2.3 |
| Unionist | Roy Wise | 12,210 | 34.2 | +0.5 |
| Liberal | Maude Egerton Marshall | 3,909 | 11.0 | +1.8 |
| Majority | | 7,340 | 20.6 | −2.8 |
| Turnout | | 35,669 | 78.9 | +0.3 |
| Labour hold | | Swing | -1.4 | |

1926 Smethwick by-election
| Party | Candidate | Votes | % | ±% |
|---|---|---|---|---|
| Labour | Oswald Mosley | 16,077 | 57.1 | +4.8 |
| Unionist | Marshall James Pike | 9,495 | 33.7 | −14.0 |
| Liberal | Edwin Bayliss | 2,600 | 9.2 | New |
| Majority | | 6,582 | 23.4 | +18.8 |
| Turnout | | 35,862 | 78.6 | +0.4 |
| Labour hold | | Swing | −9.4 | |

General election 1924: Smethwick
| Party | Candidate | Votes | % | ±% |
|---|---|---|---|---|
| Labour | John Davison | 14,491 | 52.3 | −2.4 |
| Unionist | Marshall James Pike | 13,238 | 47.7 | +2.4 |
| Majority | | 1,253 | 4.6 | −4.8 |
| Turnout | | 27,729 | 78.2 | +6.5 |
| Labour hold | | Swing | -2.4 | |

General election 1923: Smethwick
| Party | Candidate | Votes | % | ±% |
|---|---|---|---|---|
| Labour | John Davison | 13,550 | 54.7 | +4.0 |
| Unionist | Edmund Brocklebank | 11,217 | 45.3 | −4.0 |
| Majority | | 2,333 | 9.4 | +8.0 |
| Turnout | | 24,767 | 71.7 | −4.2 |
| Labour hold | | Swing | −4.0 | |

General election 1922: Smethwick
| Party | Candidate | Votes | % | ±% |
|---|---|---|---|---|
| Labour | John Davison | 13,141 | 50.7 | −1.5 |
| Unionist | Arthur Henry Addenbrooke Simcox | 12,759 | 49.3 | +1.5 |
| Majority | | 382 | 1.4 | −3.0 |
| Turnout | | 25,900 | 75.9 | +21.2 |
| Labour hold | | Swing | -1.5 | |

=== Elections in the 1910s ===
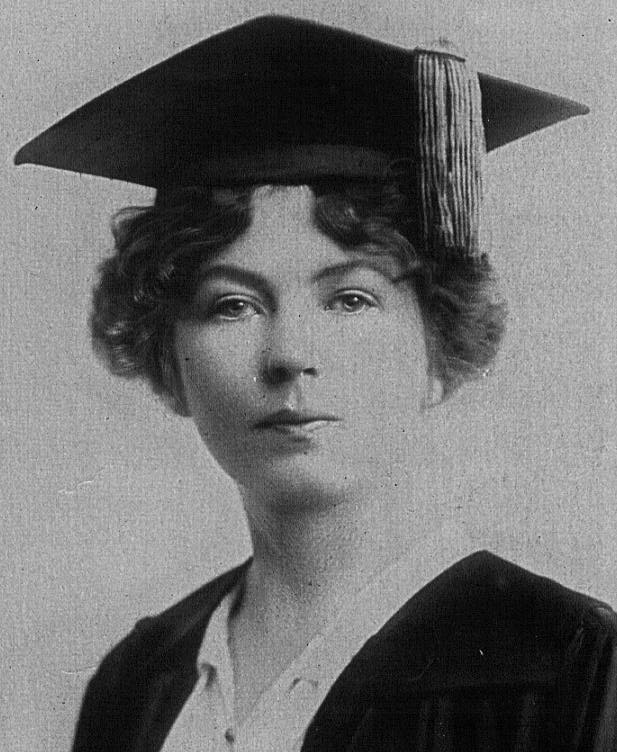
Pankhurst

General election 1918: Smethwick
| Party | Candidate | Votes | % | ±% |
|---|---|---|---|---|
| Labour | John Davison | 9,389 | 52.2 | |
| Women's Party | Christabel Pankhurst | 8,614 | 47.8 | |
| Majority | | 775 | 4.4 | |
| Turnout | | 18,003 | 54.7 | |
| Labour win (new seat) | | | | |

== See also ==
- List of parliamentary constituencies in the West Midlands (county)
- List of parliamentary constituencies in West Midlands (region)
- Smethwick (the town)
- 1926 Smethwick by-election
- 1945 Smethwick by-election
- Smethwick in the 1964 general election
