= Peter Griffiths =

British politician (1928–2013)

- Griffiths in 1965

Member of Parliament
- In office 3 May 1979 – 8 April 1997
- Preceded by: Frank Judd
- Succeeded by: Syd Rapson
- Constituency: Portsmouth North
- In office 15 October 1964 – 10 March 1966
- Preceded by: Patrick Gordon Walker
- Succeeded by: Andrew Faulds
- Constituency: Smethwick

Personal details
- Born: Peter Harry Steve Griffiths; 24 May 1928 West Bromwich, Staffordshire, England
- Died: 20 November 2013 (aged 85) Portsmouth, England
- Citizenship: British
- Party: Conservative

Peter Harry Steve Griffiths (24 May 1928 – 20 November 2013) was a British Conservative politician best known for gaining the Smethwick seat by defeating the Shadow Foreign Secretary Patrick Gordon Walker in the 1964 general election, against the national trend, by using anti-immigrant and racist rhetoric.

== Early life ==
Griffiths was born in West Bromwich, Staffordshire, and attended West Bromwich Grammar School. He was educated at Leeds Teacher Training College and, after his National Service, studied for an external London University economics degree and a master's degree in education at Birmingham University, while teaching in West Bromwich. From 1962, he was the head of Hall Green Road primary school, West Bromwich.

Griffiths was elected to Smethwick County Borough Council in 1955. At the 1959 election, he stood against Smethwick's sitting Member of Parliament (MP) Patrick Gordon Walker for the first time, and succeeded in reducing Gordon Walker's majority from 6,495 to 3,544. Griffiths became leader of the council's Conservative group in 1960, serving as a local councillor until 1963 when he resigned to stand again for the Smethwick parliamentary seat in the forthcoming general election.

== Elected MP for Smethwick ==
Labour's victory in the 1964 election had been predicted, and Patrick Gordon Walker, who had been Shadow Foreign Secretary for 18 months, was expected to hold on to his seat. Instead, Griffiths gained the seat for the Conservatives on a 7% swing, in a county borough that had the highest percentage of recent immigrants to England. Racial discrimination was common in the constituency and nationally; the local Labour club operated a colour bar.

In what Labour Prime Minister Harold Wilson later described as an "utterly squalid" campaign, Conservative party members were accused of having used the slogan "If you want a nigger for a neighbour, vote Liberal or Labour". Colin Jordan, a British Neo-Nazi and leader of the British Movement, said that members of his group had produced the initial slogan as well as spread the poster and sticker campaign; Jordan's group in the past had also campaigned on other slogans, such as: "Don't vote – a vote for Tory, Labour or Liberal is a vote for more Blacks!". Although Griffiths himself did not coin the phrase or approve its use, he declined to disown it. The Times quoted Griffiths as saying: "I would not condemn any man who said that. I regard it as a manifestation of popular feeling", adding that the quote represented "exasperation, not fascism". He denied that there was any "resentment in Smethwick on the grounds of race or colour".

Griffiths' defeat of Gordon Walker resulted in Harold Wilson saying in the House of Commons that Griffiths should "serve his term here as a parliamentary leper". Conservatives urged the Speaker, Harry Hylton-Foster, to force Wilson to withdraw the comment. While the Speaker objected to such language, he refused to censure the Prime Minister, and order in the Commons chamber was not restored for ten minutes. In his maiden speech in the Commons, Griffiths pointed out the problems faced by local industry and drew attention to the fact that 4,000 families were awaiting local authority accommodation. Griffiths remained an alderman in Smethwick until 1966. He both supported and arranged for Smethwick council to purchase a row of houses with the intention of letting them exclusively to white families. The government's Housing minister, Richard Crossman, was able to block this proposal by refusing the council permission to borrow the money required.

Griffiths was defeated by the actor and Labour candidate Andrew Faulds in the 1966 general election. Griffiths wrote his own account of his election in 1964. In A Question of Colour (1966), he said that he had "no colour prejudice". In the book he considered South Africa to be "a model of Parliamentary democracy" and that "Apartheid, if it could be separated from racialism, could well be an alternative to integration". Griffiths also blamed immigration from the Caribbean for the spread of disease.

== Later life and career ==
In 1967, he became a lecturer in economics at Portsmouth College of Technology. After a year as an exchange professor in California, he returned to what became Portsmouth Polytechnic, until he returned to Parliament.

Griffiths unsuccessfully stood for the Portsmouth North constituency at the February 1974 general election, but was elected for the seat at the 1979 general election. He held the constituency until the Labour landslide at the 1997 election, when he was defeated.

== Personal life ==
Griffiths was married to Jeannette (née Rubery); the couple had a son and daughter.

Griffiths died on 20 November 2013, aged 85.

== Bibliography ==
- Griffiths, P. (1966). A Question of Colour? The Smethwick Election of 1964. London: Leslie Frewin.
- Pearce, R. (2004). "Walker, Patrick Chrestien Gordon, Baron Gordon-Walker (1907–1980)". Oxford Dictionary of National Biography (online ed.). Oxford University Press. (Subscription, Wikipedia Library access or UK public library membership required.)
- Prem, D. R. (1965). Parliamentary Leper: A History of Colour Prejudice in Britain. Aligarh University Press: Metric Publications.
- Webster, L. (2012). Lone Wolf. Dudley: The Kates Hill Press.
- "Griffiths, Peter Harry Steve". Who's Who (2007 ed.).

Parliament of the United Kingdom
Preceded by Patrick Gordon Walker	Member of Parliament for Smethwick; 1964–1966	Succeeded by Andrew Faulds
Preceded by Frank Judd	Member of Parliament for Portsmouth North; 1979–1997	Succeeded by Syd Rapson
