= Smethwick Council House =

Municipal building in Smethwick, West Midlands, England

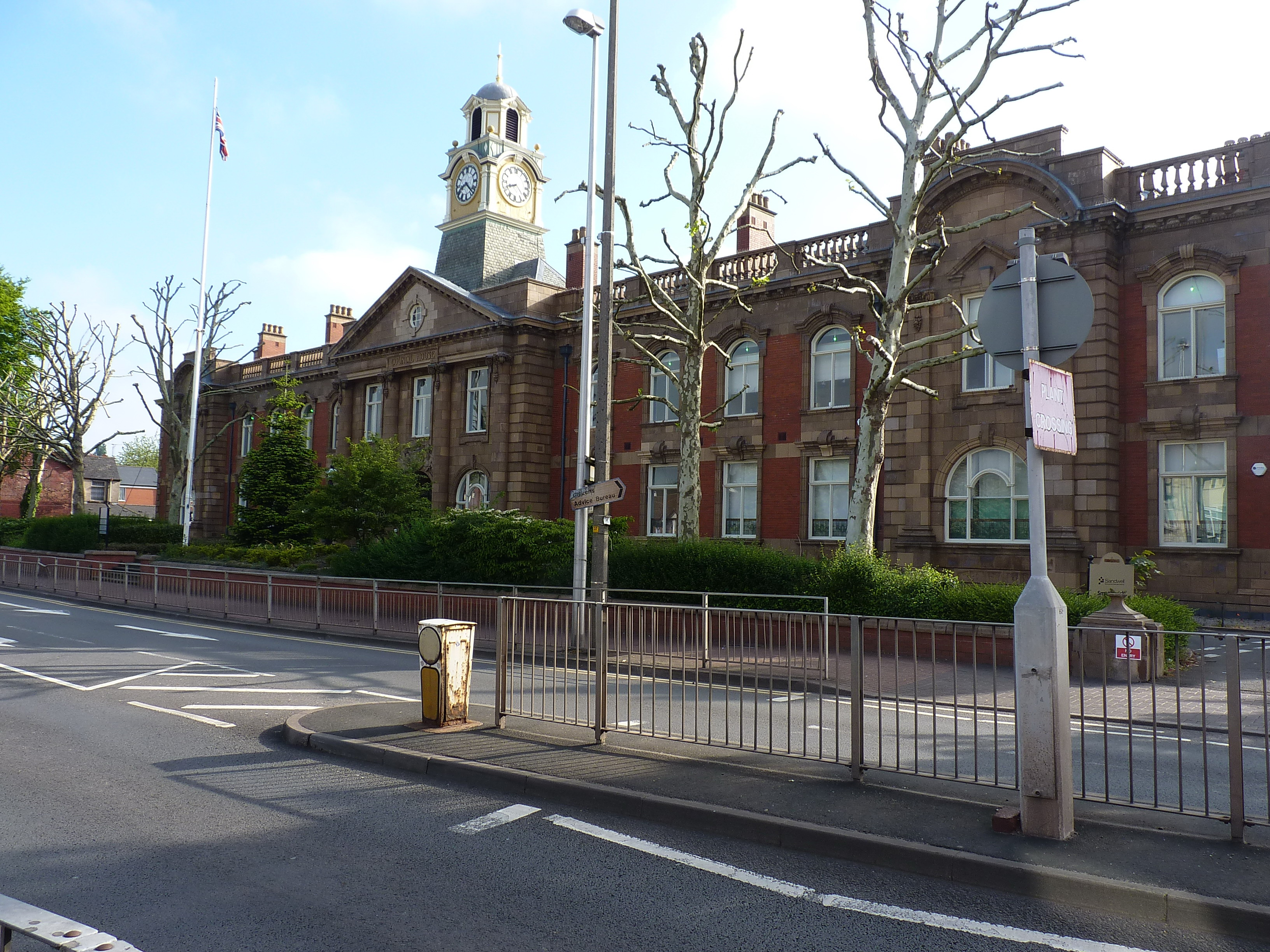
- Smethwick Council House

- Shown in the West Midlands
- 52.4909°N 1.9674°W
- Location: High Street, Smethwick

History
- Built: 1907

Site notes
- Architect: Frederick J. Gill
- Architectural style: Baroque style

Listed Building – Grade II
- Official name: Council House
- Designated: 29 September 1987
- Reference no.: 1342665

Smethwick Council House is a municipal building in Smethwick, West Midlands, England. The building, which is located on High Street and was once the headquarters of Smethwick Borough Council, is now a Grade II listed building.

== History ==
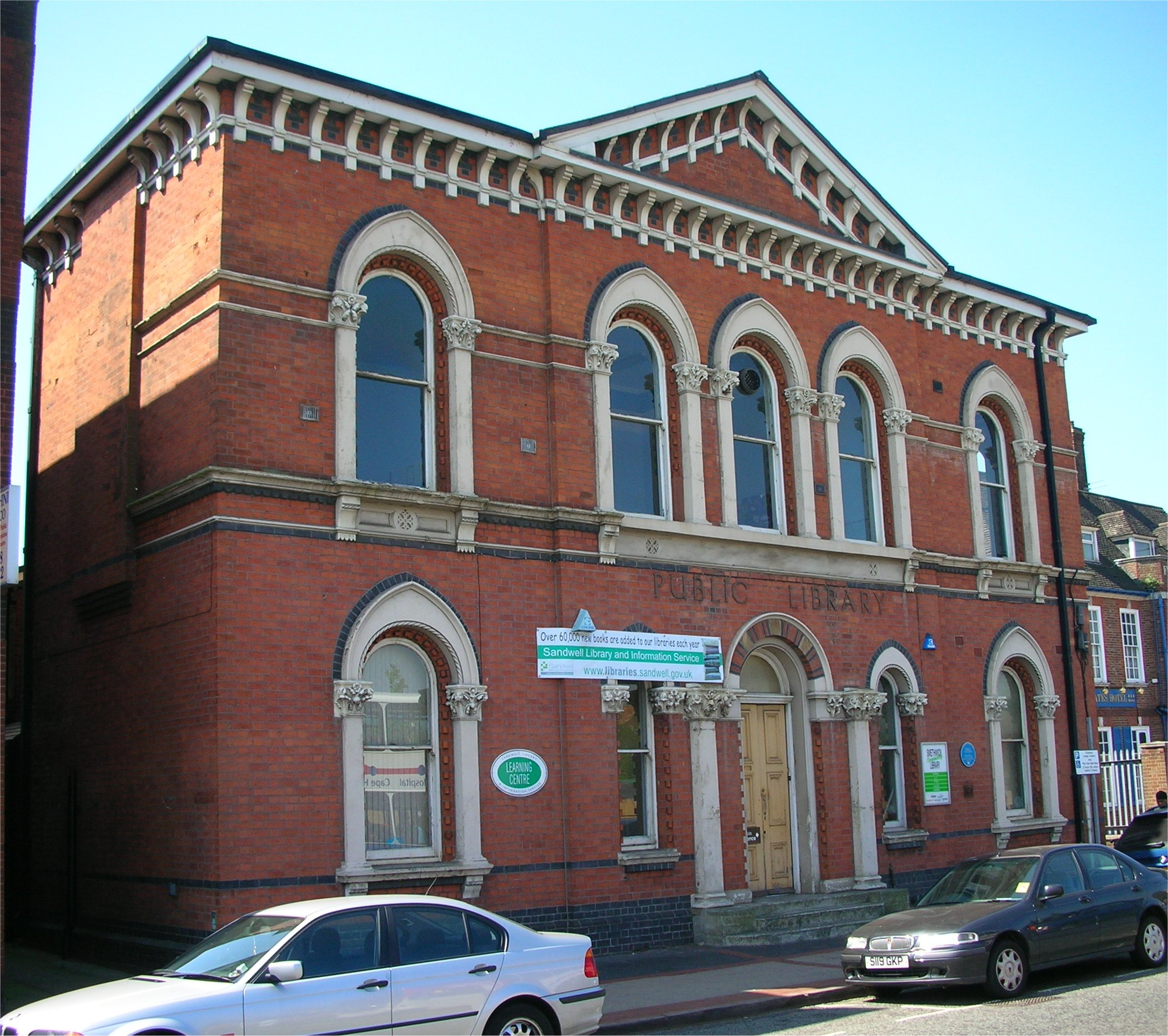
The "public buildings" in Smethwick (currently used as a public library)

After a local board of health was established in the town in 1856, it commissioned the "public buildings" for the town. This structure, which was designed by Yeoville Thomason in the Gothic style, was erected on the west side of the High Street and completed in 1867. (Note: The public buildings were converted for use as a labour exchange in 1907 and then as a public library in 1928.) After significant population growth, largely associated with new engineering businesses being formed in the town, the area became an urban district in 1894 and a municipal borough in 1899. In this context the new civic leaders decided to procure a new civic building: the site they selected was open land further south along the High Street on the east side.

The foundation stone for the new building was laid by the mayor on 2 November 1905. It was designed by Smethwick-based architect Frederick J. Gill in the Baroque style, built in red brick with some buff terracotta facings by John Dallow and Sons at a cost of £17,000 and was officially opened by the mayor on 19 June 1907. The design involved a symmetrical main frontage with fifteen bays facing onto the High Street; the central section of three bays, which slightly projected forward and was buff terracotta faced, featured a full-height tetrastyle portico with an arched entrance on the ground floor and sash windows on the first floor flanked by Ionic order columns supporting an entablature inscribed with the words "Council House" together with a modillioned pediment containing an oculus in the tympanum. The penultimate bays of each of the wings, which also projected forward and were also buff terracotta faced, featured sash windows on the first floor flanked by Ionic order pilasters supporting segmental pediments. At roof level there is a cornice, a parapet and a clock tower with a cupola. The clock was manufactured by Smith of Derby Group and the three bells were made by John Taylor & Co of Loughborough. Internally, the principal room was the council chamber, which was furnished with busts and paintings.

The area went on to become a county borough with the council house as its headquarters in 1907. A war memorial, in the form of a granite column with a bronze figure of peace at the front and with a bronze urn above, was installed just to the south of the council house in 1920. A plaque to commemorate the life of a local soldier, Sergeant Harold Colley, who was posthumously awarded the Victoria Cross for his actions at Martinpuich in France during the First World War, was unveiled in the vestibule of the council house after the war. During the Second World War a bomb landed in front of the council house on the night of 11 December 1940 but failed to explode. An extension to the rear of the building, which was linked by a bridge, was completed in 1957.

The council house continued to serve as the headquarters of the county borough for much of the 20th century and continued to function as the meeting place of the new Warley County Borough after it was formed in 1966. However, it ceased to be the local seat of government when the enlarged Sandwell Metropolitan Borough Council was formed in 1974. The building was subsequently let to a variety of local organisations and businesses including West Smethwick Enterprise.

A memorial plaque to commemorate the life of the locally-born army officer, Lieutenant Den Brotheridge, the first Allied soldier to be killed in action in the Normandy landings on 6 June 1944, was unveiled at the council house by his daughter, Margaret Brotheridge, on 2 April 1995. An extensive programme of restoration works, which involved the replacement of many of the terracotta facings and the complete replacement of the roofing slates, was completed at a cost of £350,000 in 2019. The work was recognised by Birmingham & West Midlands group of The Victorian Society, which declared the project the winner of their 2019 Conservation Award.
