= Andrew Faulds =

British actor and politician (1923–2000)

- Photographed by Godfrey Argent, 1970

Member of Parliament for Warley East Smethwick (1966–1974)
- In office 31 March 1966 – 8 April 1997
- Preceded by: Peter Griffiths
- Succeeded by: Constituency abolished

Personal details
- Born: Andrew Matthew William Faulds; 1 March 1923 Isoko, Tanganyika
- Died: 31 May 2000 (aged 77) Stratford-on-Avon, Warwickshire, England, UK
- Party: Labour
- Spouse: Bunty Whitfield (m. 1945)
- Children: Susanna Sutton
- Education: University of Glasgow
- Occupation: Actor; politician

Andrew Matthew William Faulds (1 March 1923 – 31 May 2000) was a British actor and Labour Party politician. After a successful acting career on stage, on radio and in films, he was a Member of Parliament from 1966 to 1997.

== Early life ==
Faulds was born to Church of Scotland missionary parents in Isoko, Tanganyika. Due to his father's peripatetic vocation, he grew up in various parts of Britain, and was educated at George Watson's College, Edinburgh, King Edward VI Grammar School, Louth, Daniel Stewart's College, Edinburgh, and Stirling High School. He married Bunty Whitfield in 1945. The couple had one daughter. During the Second World War he served in both the Royal Air Force and the Fleet Air Arm.

After graduating from the University of Glasgow, he joined the Royal Shakespeare Company in 1948. He first came to a wider public recognition playing Jet Morgan in Charles Chilton's radio drama Journey into Space on the BBC Light Programme.

== Acting career ==
In 1959, Faulds and his wife played host to Paul Robeson, who had travelled to Britain to appear at the Royal Shakespeare Theatre, Stratford-upon-Avon in Tony Richardson's production of Othello. Robeson had only recently been permitted again to travel abroad, following the revocation of his passport. During this visit, Robeson inspired Faulds to take up political activism.

Faulds maintained his acting career throughout the 1960s and 1970s, and in particular became a key part of film director Ken Russell's repertory company, appearing in, among other films, Dante's Inferno (1967) (as William Morris), The Devils (1971), Mahler (1974) and Lisztomania (1975). He appeared in Russell's film The Music Lovers (1970) alongside Glenda Jackson, who later also become a Labour MP.

One of Faulds' best-remembered roles is Phalerus in Jason and the Argonauts (1963), in which he took part in the skeleton fight scene that featured model work by Ray Harryhausen. Another was in "The Radio Ham" (1961), an episode of Hancock, as the unseen voice of 'mayday'.

== Member of Parliament ==
Faulds first stood for Parliament as the Labour candidate in the 1963 Stratford by-election, caused by the resignation of John Profumo over a security scandal. He fought the constituency again in the general election the following year, but on both occasions he was beaten by the Conservative future Cabinet minister Angus Maude.

In the 1964 general election, the Labour Shadow Foreign Secretary, Patrick Gordon Walker, was defeated in controversial circumstances in the Smethwick constituency by Conservative candidate Peter Griffiths. Smethwick had become the home of immigrants from the Commonwealth in the years following the Second World War, and Griffiths' 1964 campaign was critical of Conservative government policy as well as of Labour statements on the issue. Increasing the Labour vote in the Smethwick constituency for the first time since 1950, Faulds defeated Griffiths in the 1966 general election and became Labour Member of Parliament (MP) for the constituency, being re-elected until his retirement in 1997.

The constituency was renamed Warley East in 1974. Smethwick remained the focus of much racial tension in Britain throughout Faulds' time as an MP, in particular following the "Rivers of Blood speech" by fellow West Midlands MP Enoch Powell in 1968. Faulds characterised Powell's speech as "... unchristian ... unprincipled, undemocratic and racialist." Faulds has sometimes been named as a supporter of capital punishment on the basis of off-the-cuff remarks, but he is listed in Hansard as voting against the restoration of the death penalty in 1969.

Faulds became known for using controversial language in the House of Commons; for example, verbally attacking Norman St John-Stevas in a heated debate over abortion in 1967, saying that he "has not the capacity to put a bun in anybody's oven" (referring to Stevas' homosexuality). In 1978, Faulds was pressured to apologise for calling John Davies, the Shadow Foreign Secretary at the time, a "fat-arsed twit"; ten years later, Faulds was reproached for calling David Shaw "an honourable shit". In 1990, he called prime minister Margaret Thatcher a "stupid, negative woman" for sending troops into the Gulf.

In 1973, Labour leader Harold Wilson dismissed Faulds as Labour's arts spokesman for accusing Jewish MPs of dual loyalty.

A Europhile, Faulds was one of only five Labour MPs to vote for the Third Reading of the European Communities (Amendment) Act 1993 (which gave effect in UK law to the Maastricht Treaty) in 1993. In so doing, he defied his party whip, which was to abstain.

== Filmography ==
- The Million Pound Note (1954) – Chief Assistant at Tailor Shop (uncredited)
- Passport to Treason (1955) – Barrett
- Jumping for Joy (1956) – Drunk's Friend (uncredited)
- The One That Got Away (1957) – Lieutenant, Grizedale
- Blind Spot (1958) – Police Inspector
- Blood of the Vampire (1958) – Chief Guard Wetzler
- The Trollenberg Terror (1958) – Brett
- Sea of Sand (1958) – Sgt. Parker
- Danger Within (1959) – Lt. Comdr. 'Dopey' Gibbon, R.N.
- SOS Pacific (1959) – Sea Captain
- The Professionals (1960) – Inspector Rankin
- The Flesh and the Fiends (1960) – Inspector McCulloch
- Once More, with Feeling! (1960) – Interviewer (uncredited)
- Payroll (1961) – Detective Inspector Carberry
- The Hellfire Club (1961) – Lord Netherden
- A Matter of WHO (1961) – Ralph
- What Every Woman Wants (1962) – Derek Chadwick
- Cleopatra (1963) – Canidius
- Lorna Doone (1963) - Carver Doone
- Jason and the Argonauts (1963) – Phalerus
- The Protectors (1964) - Ian Souter
- Chimes at Midnight (1965) – Westmoreland
- A Funny Thing Happened on the Way to the Forum (1966)
- The One Eyed Soldiers (1966) – Colonel Ferrer
- The Charge of the Light Brigade (1968) – Quaker preacher
- The Music Lovers (1970) – Davidov
- The Devils (1971) – Rangier
- Young Winston (1972) – Mounted Boer
- Mahler (1974) – Doctor on Train
- Lisztomania (1975) – Strauss

== Notes ==
Parliament of the United Kingdom
Preceded by Peter Griffiths	Member of Parliament for Smethwick; 1966 – Feb 1974	Constituency abolished
New constituency	Member of Parliament for Warley East; Feb 1974 – 1997	Constituency abolished
