= Leyton (ward) =

Electoral ward in Waltham Forest, London, England

Coordinates: 51.560°N 0.020°W

- Electoral ward for the Waltham Forest London Borough Council
- Leyton ward boundaries since 2022
- Borough: Waltham Forest
- County: Greater London
- Population: 13,114 (2021) (Note: 2021 Census data reported for 2022 ward boundaries)
- Electorate: 9,421 (2022)
- Major settlements: Leyton
- Area: 1.941 square kilometres (0.749 sq mi)

Current electoral ward
- Created: 1965
- Number of members: 3
- Councillors: Rhiannon Eglin; Whitney Ihenachor; Terry Wheeler
- GSS code: E05013896

Leyton is an electoral ward in the London Borough of Waltham Forest. The ward has existed since the creation of the borough on 1 April 1965 and was first used in the 1964 elections. It returns three councillors to Waltham Forest London Borough Council. The ward was subject to boundary revisions in 1978, 2002 and 2022. Miranda Grell was elected in 2006 and disqualified in 2007 for making false statements under the Representation of the People Act 1983, which triggered a by-election in 2008.

== Landmarks ==
Prominent landmarks are Leyton Orient's Brisbane Road ground and New Spitalfields Market.

== Waltham Forest council elections since 2022 ==
There was a revision of ward boundaries in Waltham Forest in 2022.

=== 2022 election ===
The election took place on 5 May 2022.

2022 Waltham Forest London Borough Council election: Leyton
Party	Candidate	Votes	%	±%
Labour	Rhiannon Eglin	1,610	71.9	
Labour	Whitney Ihenachor	1,478	66.0	
Labour	Terry Wheeler	1,291	57.7	
Green	Rob Gardner	511	22.8	
Liberal Democrats	Shaukat Ali	456	20.4	
Liberal Democrats	Meera Chadha	390	17.4	
Liberal Democrats	Trevo Stone	313	14.0	
Conservative	Lauren Maske	217	9.7	
Conservative	Eliz Karamehmet	209	9.3	
Conservative	Ehsanullah Mohammed	170	7.6	
TUSC	Martin Reynolds	71	3.2	
Turnout			25.6	
Labour win (new boundaries)				
Labour win (new boundaries)				
Labour win (new boundaries)				

== 2002–2022 Waltham Forest council elections ==
Leyton ward boundaries from 2002 to 2022

There was a revision of ward boundaries in Waltham Forest in 2002.

=== 2018 election ===
The election took place on 3 May 2018.

2018 Waltham Forest London Borough Council election: Leyton
Party	Candidate	Votes	%	±%
Labour	Jacob Edwards	2,122	57.4	
Labour	Whitney Ihenachor	2,114	57.2	
Labour	Simon Miller	1,943	52.5	
Liberal Democrats	Bob Sullivan	1,253	33.9	
Liberal Democrats	Ed Bird	1,167	31.6	
Liberal Democrats	Farooq Qureshi	1,162	31.4	
Conservative	Patricia Branagan	192	5.2	
Conservative	Rommel Moseley	190	5.1	
Conservative	Michael Caplan	176	4.8	
Duma Polska	Bogusława Danielewicz	96	2.6	
TUSC	Cédric Gérôme	85	2.3	
Turnout			36.18%	
Majority		690		
Labour hold		Swing		
Labour hold		Swing		
Labour hold		Swing		

=== 2014 election ===
The election took place on 22 May 2014.

2014 Waltham Forest London Borough Council election: Leyton
Party	Candidate	Votes	%	±%
Labour	Jacob Edwards	1,973	19%	
Labour	Whitney Ihenachor	1,923	19%	
Labour	Simon Miller	1,786	17%	
Liberal Democrats	Bob Sullivan	1,211	12%	
Liberal Democrats	Audrey Lee	1,044	10%	
Liberal Democrats	Jerome Harvey-Agyei	1,022	10%	
Green	Diana Wellings	381	4%	
Conservative	James Edwards	233	2%	
Conservative	Anne Pryor	209	2%	
Conservative	Nicholas Hyett	205	2%	
TUSC	Suzanne Beishon	157	2%	
TUSC	Kevin Parslow	130	1%	
Turnout		10,274		
Labour gain from Liberal Democrats				
Labour gain from Liberal Democrats				
Labour gain from Liberal Democrats				

=== 2010 election ===
The election on 6 May 2010 took place on the same day as the United Kingdom general election.

2010 Waltham Forest London Borough Council election: Leyton
Party	Candidate	Votes	%	±%
Liberal Democrats	Naheed Qureshi	2,190		
Liberal Democrats	Winnie Smith	2,104		
Liberal Democrats	Bob Sullivan	2,095		
Labour	Patrick Edwards	1,996		
Labour	Simon Miller	1,967		
Labour	Matthew Garness	1,954		
Green	Diana Wellings	618		
Conservative	Christopher Nott	446		
Conservative	Mollie Neilson-Hansen	436		
Conservative	Carol Chatfield	123		
Turnout			54.6%	
Liberal Democrats hold				
Liberal Democrats hold				
Liberal Democrats gain from Labour				

=== 2008 by-election ===
The by-election took place on 14 February 2008, following the disqualification of Miranda Grell.

2008 Leyton by-election
Party	Candidate	Votes	%	±%
Liberal Democrats	Winnie Smith	1,360	56.0	+12.8
Labour	Khevyn Limbajee	695	28.6	−14.1
Independent	Carole Vincent	176	7.2	+7.2
Conservative	Edwin Northover	108	4.4	−2.1
Green	William Measure	90	3.7	−3.9
Majority		665	27.4	
Turnout		2,429	27.8	
Liberal Democrats gain from Labour		Swing		

=== 2006 election ===
The election took place on 4 May 2006.

2006 Waltham Forest London Borough Council election: Leyton
Party	Candidate	Votes	%	±%
Liberal Democrats	Naheed Qureshi	1,443		
Labour	Miranda Grell	1,427		
Liberal Democrats	Bob Sullivan	1,424		
Liberal Democrats	Barry Smith	1,399		
Labour	Simon Wright	1,245		
Labour	Nicholas Russell	1,242		
Green	Helen Griffith	253		
Conservative	Paul Braham	216		
Conservative	Anne Pryor	176		
Conservative	Colette Gosling	167		
Turnout			37.6%	
Liberal Democrats hold				
Labour gain from Liberal Democrats				
Liberal Democrats hold				

=== 2002 election ===
The election took place on 2 May 2002.

2002 Waltham Forest London Borough Council election: Leyton
Party	Candidate	Votes	%	±%
Liberal Democrats	Loretta Hodges	1,593		
Liberal Democrats	Robert Sullivan	1,552		
Liberal Democrats	Barry Smith	1,494		
Labour	Grace Chambers	883		
Labour	Crispin St Hill	836		
Labour	Nicholas Russell	806		
Conservative	Peter Smith	174		
Conservative	Janet James	167		
Conservative	Roger Wheeler	119		
Turnout				
Liberal Democrats win (new boundaries)				
Liberal Democrats win (new boundaries)				
Liberal Democrats win (new boundaries)				

== 1978–2002 Waltham Forest council elections ==
Leyton ward boundaries from 1978 to 2002

There was a revision of ward boundaries in Waltham Forest in 1978.

=== 1998 election ===
The election took place on 7 May 1998.

=== 1994 election ===
The election took place on 5 May 1994.

1994 Waltham Forest Council election: Leyton
Party	Candidate	Votes	%	±%
Liberal Democrats	Robert Sullivan	2,081	52.63	▲6.25
Liberal Democrats	Loretta Hodges	1,981		
Liberal Democrats	Charles Tuckey	1,893		
Labour	Denis Gray	1,874	47.36	▲2.72
Labour	Sajid Ramzan	1,748		
Labour	Crispin St Hill	1,735		
Registered electors		8,344		▼40
Turnout		4,065	48.72	▼1.60
Rejected ballots		12	0.30	▲0.06
Liberal Democrats hold				
Liberal Democrats hold				
Liberal Democrats gain from Labour				

== 1964–1978 Waltham Forest council elections ==
=== 1970 by-election ===
The by-election took place on 17 September 1970.

1970 Leyton by-election
Party	Candidate	Votes	%	±%
Labour	P. Leighton	1,230		
Conservative	F. Barnes	363		
Liberal	L. Roskilly	95		
Turnout			16.8%	
