= Forest (Waltham Forest ward) =

Electoral ward in London, England

- Electoral ward for the Waltham Forest London Borough Council
- Borough: London Borough of Waltham Forest
- County: Greater London
- Population: 17,257 (2021)
- Area: 2.183 km²

Current electoral ward
- Created: 1965
- Number of members: 3
- Councillors: Simone McNichols-Thomas; Yuksel Gonul; Paul Perkins

Forest is an electoral ward in the London Borough of Waltham Forest. The ward was first used in the 1964 elections and elects three councillors to Waltham Forest London Borough Council.

== Geography ==
The ward is based on the Hollow Pond area between Leytonstone and Walthamstow.

== Councillors ==
Election	Councillors		
2002	Jane Duran (Labour)	Kabal Dhillon (Labour)	Mohammed Rahman (Labour)
2006	Farooq Qureshi (Liberal Democrats)	Imran Abrahim (Liberal Democrats)	Faiz Yunis (Labour)
2010	Farooq Qureshi (Liberal Democrats)	Shabana Dhedhi (Labour)	Gerry Lyons (Labour)
2014	Kastriot Berberi (Labour)	Shabana Dhedhi (Labour)	Gerry Lyons (Labour)
2018	Kastriot Berberi (Labour)	Shabana Dhedhi (Labour)	Gerry Lyons (Labour)
2022	Kastriot Berberi (Labour)	Marsela Berberi (Labour)	Zafran Malik (Labour)
2026	Simone McNichols-Thomas (Green)	Yuksel Gonul (Green)	Paul Perkins (Green)

== Elections ==
=== 2022 ===
Forest (3)
Party	Candidate	Votes	%	±%
Labour	Marsela Berberi	2,045	68.8	
Labour	Zafran Malik	1,982	66.6	
Labour	Kastriot Berberi	1,961	65.9	
Green	Glyn Roberts	716	24.1	
Liberal Democrats	Josh Hadley	431	14.5	
Liberal Democrats	Justin Randle	361	12.1	
Liberal Democrats	Gavin Sallery	316	10.6	
Conservative	Sakarya Karamehmet	289	9.7	
Conservative	Ismet Karamehmet	284	9.5	
Conservative	Sema Karamehmet	262	8.8	
TUSC	Arshad Ahmad	172	5.8	
TUSC	Arnold Ssekandwa	103	3.5	
Turnout			30.0	
Labour hold				
Labour hold				
Labour hold				

== See also ==
- List of electoral wards in Greater London
