= Cann Hall (Waltham Forest ward) =

Electoral ward in the London Borough of Waltham Forest

- Electoral ward for the Waltham Forest London Borough Council
- Cann Hall ward boundaries since 2022
- Borough: Waltham Forest
- County: Greater London
- Population: 16,320 (2021) (Note: 2021 Census data reported for 2022 ward boundaries)

Current electoral ward
- Created: 1965
- GSS code: E05013882

Cann Hall is an electoral ward in the London Borough of Waltham Forest.

== Waltham Forest council elections ==
=== 2022 election ===
The election took place on 5 May 2022.

2022 Waltham Forest London Borough Council election: Cann Hall (3)
Party	Candidate	Votes	%	±%
Labour	Sally Littlejohn	1,943	75.8	
Labour	Kischa-Bianca Green	1,873	73.0	
Labour	Keith Rayner	1,671	65.2	
Green	Peter Richardson	639	24.9	
Liberal Democrats	Joan Carder	359	14.0	
Liberal Democrats	Suleman Ahmed	301	11.7	
Conservative	Henryka Gibbons	283	11.0	
Conservative	Otis Griffin	281	11.0	
Conservative	Eylem Kizil	224	8.7	
TUSC	Tim Stronge	118	4.6	
Turnout			26.0	
Labour hold				
Labour hold				
Labour hold				

=== 2018 elections ===
The election took place on 3 May 2018.

2018 Waltham Forest London Borough Council election: Cann Hall (3)
Party	Candidate	Votes	%	±%
Labour	Sally Littlejohn	1,993	64.6	
Labour	Keith Rayner	1,971	63.9	
Labour	Patrick Edwards	1,958	63.5	
Liberal Democrats	Liz Phillips	726	23.5	
Liberal Democrats	Rupert Augistine Alexander	682	22.1	
Liberal Democrats	Faiz Faiz	574	18.6	
Green	Ami Amlani	434	14.1	
Conservative	Kathleen Berg	178	5.8	
Conservative	Philip Brimley	167	5.4	
Conservative	Muhammed Shaikh	167	5.4	
TUSC	Claire Rosa Laker-Mansfield	67	2.2	
Turnout			33.89%	
Majority		1,276		
Labour hold		Swing		
Labour hold		Swing		
Labour hold		Swing		

=== 2014 election ===
The election took place on 22 May 2014.

2014 Waltham Forest London Borough Council election: Cann Hall
Party	Candidate	Votes	%
Labour	Keith Rayner	1,779	20%
Labour	Patrick Edwards	1,682	19%
Labour	Sally Littlejohn	1,640	18%
Liberal Democrats	Liz Phillips*	985	11%
Liberal Democrats	Rupert Alexander	837	9%
Liberal Democrats	Adrian Trett	756	8%
Green	Pat Howie	401	5%
Conservative	Guilherme de Gouveia	264	3%
Conservative	Christopher Nott	226	3%
Conservative	Joseph Leport	196	2%
TUSC	Claire Laker-Mansfield	134	2%
Turnout		8,900	
Labour hold			
Labour hold			
Labour gain from Liberal Democrats			

=== 2010 election ===
The election on 6 May 2010 took place on the same day as the United Kingdom general election.

2010 Waltham Forest London Borough Council election: Cann Hall
Party	Candidate	Votes	%
Labour	Tunde Davies	2,103	
Labour	Nicholas Russell	1,986	
Liberal Democrats	Liz Phillips	1,986	
Liberal Democrats	Keith Rayner	1,829	
Labour	Faiz Yunis	1,784	
Liberal Democrats	Adrian Trett	1,493	
Conservative	Bill de Gouveia	509	
Conservative	Letrois Bernard	492	
Conservative	David Hemsted	447	
Green	Pat Howie	420	
Turnout			55.2%
Labour gain from Liberal Democrats			
Labour gain from Liberal Democrats			
Liberal Democrats hold			

=== 2006 election ===
The election took place on 4 May 2006.

2006 Waltham Forest London Borough Council election: Cann Hall
Party	Candidate	Votes	%
Liberal Democrats	Liz Phillips	1,345	
Liberal Democrats	Keith Rayner	1,338	
Liberal Democrats	Laura Sheppard	1,197	
Labour	Shah Ahmed	1,003	
Labour	Victoria Baffour-Awuah	975	
Labour	Richard Devaney	914	
Green	Pat Howie	337	
Conservative	Paul Canal	247	
Conservative	Kathleen Gosling	201	
Conservative	Mary Neilson-Hansen	200	
Turnout			34.5%
Liberal Democrats hold			
Liberal Democrats hold			
Liberal Democrats hold			
