= Waltham Forest London Borough Council elections =

Local government elections in London, England

A map showing the wards of Waltham Forest since 2022.

Waltham Forest London Borough Council in London is elected every four years. Since the last boundary changes in 2022, 60 councillors have been elected from 22 wards, with 2 or 3 councillors per ward.

== Council elections ==
Summary of the council composition after recent council elections, click on the year for full details of each election.

Year	Green	Labour	Conservative	Liberal Democrats	Independent	Council control after election	Notes
1964		33	3	0	9	Labour	
1968		4	44	0	0	Conservative	
1971		39	9	0	0	Labour	
1974		36	12	0	0	Labour	
1978		36	21	0	0	Labour	Boundary changes increased the number of seats by 11.
1982		26	25	6	0	No overall control	
1986		31	16	10	0	Labour	
1990	0	30	16	11	0	Labour	
1994	0	27	16	14	0	No overall control	Boundary changes took place but the number of seats remained the same. (Note: The Essex and Greater London (County and London Borough Boundaries) Order 1993) (Note: The East London Boroughs (London Borough Boundaries) (No. 2) Order 1993)
1998	0	30	15	12	0	Labour	Boundary changes took place but the number of seats remained the same. (Note: The Redbridge and Waltham Forest (London Borough Boundaries) Order 1993)
2002	0	29	18	13	0	No overall control	Boundary changes increased the number of seats by 3.
2006	0	26	15	19	0	No overall control	
2010	0	36	18	6	0	Labour	
2014	0	44	16	0	0	Labour	
2018	0	46	14	0	0	Labour	
2022	0	47	13	0	0	Labour	Boundary changes took place but the number of seats remained the same.
2026	31	15	14	0	0	Green	

== Borough result maps ==
2002 results map

2006 results map

2010 results map

2014 results map

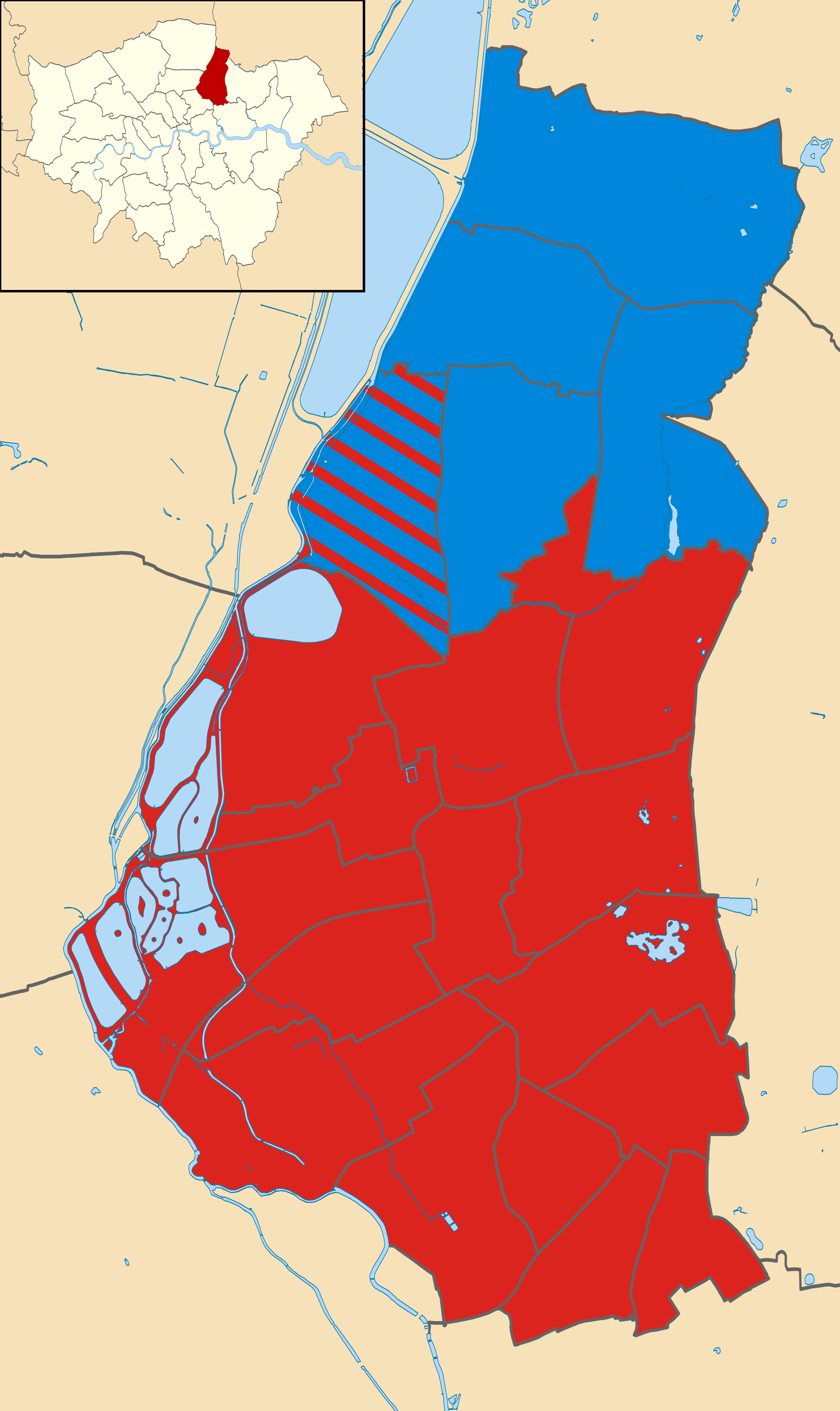
2018 results map

2022 results map

2026 results map

== By-election results ==
=== 1964-1968 ===
There were no by-elections.

=== 1968-1971 ===
Leyton by-election, 17 September 1970
Party	Candidate	Votes	%	±%
Labour	P. L. Leighton	1230		
Conservative	F. Barnes	363		
Liberal	L. C. A. Roskilly	95		
Turnout			16.8%	

=== 1971-1974 ===
Central by-election, 11 May 1972
Party	Candidate	Votes	%	±%
Labour	H. M. Cohen	1,324		
Conservative	E. J. White	839		
Communist	R. A. Sayers	78		
Turnout			21.4%	

Chapel End by-election, 11 May 1972
Party	Candidate	Votes	%	±%
Labour	K. Gordon	1,796		
Conservative	J. Watson	1,396		
Liberal	G. E. Caryer	306		
Turnout			33.1%	

St James Street by-election, 5 July 1973
Party	Candidate	Votes	%	±%
Labour	N. F. Gerrard	1,056		
Liberal	M. P. O'Flanagan	512		
Residents	D. R. South	363		
Conservative	B. R. Eden	180		
Ratepayers Association	H. L. Rider	163		
Turnout			26.0%	

=== 1974-1978 ===
Chapel End by-election, 2 December 1976
Party	Candidate	Votes	%	±%
Conservative	Reginald B. Lewis	1,284		
Labour	Joseph Levy	785		
National Front	Donald R. South	356		
The Centre Party	Ronald W. Garner	283		
Ratepayers	Wilfred Atkinson	241		
Liberal	Barry R. Woodward	188		
Turnout			31.0	

Chingford Central by-election, 2 December 1976
Party	Candidate	Votes	%	±%
Conservative	Graham F. Sinclair	1,811		
Ratepayers	Henry J. Berry	736		
Labour	Paul J. Diamond	504		
National Front	John R. P. King	407		
Liberal	Michael J. Mackrory	260		
The Centre Party	Michael J. Page	235		
Turnout			34.6	

St James Street by-election, 21 April 1977
Party	Candidate	Votes	%	±%
Labour	Robert C. Hammond	1,090		
Conservative	Laurie Braham	568		
National Front	Donald R. South	396		
Liberal	George D. Bristow	201		
Turnout			29.1	

=== 1978-1982 ===
Forest by-election, 26 April 1979
Party	Candidate	Votes	%	±%
Conservative	Laurie Braham	1,919		
Labour	Imdad Hussain	1,172		
Turnout			36.8	
Conservative hold		Swing		

The by-election was called following the death of Cllr Eve Halsey

Cann Hall by-election, 27 November 1980
Party	Candidate	Votes	%	±%
Labour	Joseph Levy	1,232		
Conservative	Thomas H Kelly	507		
Liberal	Clyde Kitson	251		
Ecology	Stephen P Collins	53		
Turnout			26.7	
Labour hold		Swing		

The by-election was called following the death of Cllr Lilian Gurr

Leyton by-election, 29 October 1981
Party	Candidate	Votes	%	±%
Liberal	Robert F Sullivan	1,854		
Labour	Phillip S Wright	892		
Ecology	Ann Darnbrough	49		
Turnout			32.5	
Liberal gain from Labour		Swing		

The by-election was called following the death of Cllr Frederick Wigg

=== 1982-1986 ===
Grove Green by-election, 29 September 1983
Party	Candidate	Votes	%	±%
Liberal	Wade Gibson-Kight	1,545		
Labour	Jeremy J Miles	1,396		
Conservative	Edward A Donnelly	378		
Turnout			39.4	
Liberal gain from Labour		Swing		

The by-election was called following the resignation of Cllr Harry Cohen

=== 1986-1990 ===
Higham Hill by-election, 24 March 1988
Party	Candidate	Votes	%	±%
Liberal Democrats	Robert J Wheatley	995		
Conservative	Thomas H Kelly	661		
Labour	Beryl F Eccleston	497		
Ratepayers	Janet G Young	200		
Turnout			47.08	
Liberal Democrats gain from Labour		Swing		

The by-election was called following the resignation of Cllr Joseph Levy

Leyton by-election, 7 July 1988
Party	Candidate	Votes	%	±%
Liberal Democrats	David H Worsfold	1,790		
Labour	Jonathan Wray	1,309		
Conservative	Abdul W Alavi	199		
Democrats and Commonwealth	Anwar-Ul-Mulk Chaudhry	81		
Turnout			40.67	
Liberal Democrats gain from Labour		Swing		

The by-election was called following the resignation of Cllr Peter Barnett

=== 1990-1994 ===
Leytonstone by-election, 15 October 1992
Party	Candidate	Votes	%	±%
Labour	Jennifer Gray	1,194	48.6	
Lib Dem Focus Team	Jonathan H. Fryer	969	39.6	
Conservative	Michael Thompson	182	7.4	
Independent	Colin R. Bex	112	4.6	
Turnout			29.3	
Labour hold		Swing		

The by-election was called following the resignation of Cllr Patrick Hayes.

=== 1994-1998 ===
Wood Street by-election, 1 May 1997
Party	Candidate	Votes	%	±%
Labour	Angela M. Bean	2,718	49.5	+8.7
Liberal Democrats	Robert S. Meadowcroft	1,717	31.2	−14.5
Conservative	Robert J. Brock	1,079	19.6	+5.9
Majority		1,001	18.3	
Turnout		5,514	63.1	
Labour gain from Liberal Democrats		Swing		

The by-election was called following the resignation of Cllr Neal Chubb.

=== 1998-2002 ===
Leytonstone by-election, 1 October 1998
Party	Candidate	Votes	%	±%
Labour	Ian Leslie	997	47.3	+0.0
Liberal Democrats	John C. Howard	965	45.8	+18.5
Conservative	Matthew R. Sharp	78	3.7	−4.2
Independent	Roderick M. Milroy	66	3.1	−2.7
Majority		32	1.5	
Turnout		2,106	27.8	
Labour hold		Swing		

The by-election was called following the resignation of Cllr Huw Morgan-Thomas.

=== 2002-2006 ===
Forest by-election, 15 May 2003
Party	Candidate	Votes	%	±%
Liberal Democrats	Mashoodul F. Qureshi	1,283	45.5	+17.7
Labour	David G. Hayes	717	25.4	−12.9
Conservative	Julien A. S. Foster	417	14.8	+3.8
Independent	Mohammed Shafiq	183	6.5	+6.5
Green	Mark S. Dawes	171	6.1	−6.0
Socialist Alliance	Cecilia Prosper	47	1.7	−1.6
Majority		566	20.1	
Turnout		2,818	38.0	
Liberal Democrats gain from Labour		Swing		

The by-election was called following the death of Cllr Mohammed Rahman.

William Morris by-election, 4 September 2003
Party	Candidate	Votes	%	±%
Liberal Democrats	Robert J. Wheatley	1,051	43.6	+18.9
Labour	Geraldine Reardon	932	38.7	−11.9
Conservative	Kabir A. Sabar	188	7.8	−7.1
Green	Gary P. Lancet	151	6.3	+6.3
Socialist Alliance	Lee Rock	84	3.5	−6.3
Majority		119	4.9	
Turnout		2,406	30.3	
Liberal Democrats gain from Labour		Swing		

The by-election was called following the resignation of Cllr Martin O'Connor.

Valley by-election, 28 October 2004
Party	Candidate	Votes	%	±%
Conservative	Laurance A. Wedderburn	791	36.9	−17.4
Liberal Democrats	Henry A. Boyle	710	33.2	+21.6
Labour	Margaret L. Broadley	552	25.8	−8.3
Respect	Christopher Dransfield	88	4.1	+4.1
Majority		81	3.7	
Turnout		2,141	27.6	
Conservative hold		Swing		

The by-election was called following the resignation of Cllr David Divine.

Hoe Street by-election, 18 November 2004
Party	Candidate	Votes	%	±%
Labour	Arunes Sarkar	774	40.4	−1.1
Liberal Democrats	Mohammad S. Diwan	561	29.2	+13.1
Conservative	Graham F. Sinclair	299	15.6	−4.7
Green	Mark S. Dawes	199	10.4	−6.4
Socialist	Louise H. Thompson	85	4.4	−1.0
Majority		213	11.2	
Turnout		1,918	23.0	
Labour hold		Swing		

The by-election was called following the death of Cllr Mohammed Nasim.

Leytonstone by-election, 14 July 2005
Party	Candidate	Votes	%	±%
Labour	Marie E. Pye	937	38.0	+3.0
Liberal Democrats	Meher Khan	765	31.3	−2.4
Respect	Caroline M. Coleman	354	14.5	+14.5
Conservative	Julien A. S. Foster	225	9.1	+1.7
Green	Mark S. Dawes	165	6.7	−8.0
Majority		172	6.7	
Turnout		2,446	30.9	
Labour hold		Swing		

The by-election was called following the resignation of Cllr Ian Leslie.

=== 2006-2010 ===
Chingford Green by-election, 26 April 2007
Party	Candidate	Votes	%	±%
Conservative	Andrew P. J. Hemsted	1,694	55.2	−14.8
Liberal Democrats	Graham A. Woolnough	1,022	33.3	+14.3
Labour	Gerry A. Lyons	208	6.8	−4.2
UKIP	Robert J. Brock	143	4.7	+4.7
Majority		672	21.9	
Turnout		3,067	38.5	
Conservative hold		Swing		

The by-election was called following the death of Cllr Derek Arnold.

Leyton by-election, 14 February 2008
Party	Candidate	Votes	%	±%
Liberal Democrats	Winnifred F. Smith	1,360	56.0	+12.8
Labour	Khevyn R. Limbajee	695	28.6	−14.1
Independent	Carole A. Vincent*	176	7.2	+7.2
Conservative	Edwin J. Northover	108	4.4	−2.1
Green	William J. Measure	90	3.7	−3.9
Majority		665	27.4	
Turnout		2,429	27.8	
Liberal Democrats gain from Labour		Swing		

The by-election was called following the disqualification of Cllr Miranda Grell.
*No description (rather than independent). Candidate is a member of the Respect Party and was supported by the local branch. She was unable to use Respect as her description due to a split in the party. Current UK electoral law allows candidates to stand without any description rather than independent if preferred.

Forest by-election, 5 June 2008
Party	Candidate	Votes	%	±%
Liberal Democrats	Samina S. Safdar	977	36.9	−2.3
Labour	Jawade A. Liaqat	927	35.0	+1.4
Conservative	Edwin J. Northover	507	19.1	+5.9
Green	Mark S. Dawes	184	6.9	−7.0
Left List	Makola Mayambika	56	2.1	+2.1
Majority		50	1.9	
Turnout		2,651	32.2	
Liberal Democrats hold		Swing		

The by-election was called following the resignation of Cllr. Imran Abrahim.

Valley by-election, 6 November 2008
Party	Candidate	Votes	%	±%
Conservative	Jemma Hemsted	1183		
Liberal Democrats	Henry Boyle	734		
Labour	Geoffrey Hammond	439		
Turnout				
Conservative hold		Swing		

The by-election was called following the death of Cllr. John M. Gover.

Hale End & Highams Park by-election, 4 December 2008
Party	Candidate	Votes	%	±%
Liberal Democrats	Jane E. Morgan	1298		
Liberal Democrats	Nicky R. Bason	1295		
Conservative	Sandeep D. Christian	1223		
Conservative	Sheree L. Rackham	1155		
Labour	Mohammed S. K. Ahmed	264		
Labour	Gerry Lyons	241		
Green	Daniel P. Perrett	142		
Turnout				
Liberal Democrats hold		Swing		
Liberal Democrats hold		Swing		

The by-election was called following the death of Cllr John Beanse and the resignation of Cllr John Penstone due to ill health.

Larkswood by-election, 19 March 2009
Party	Candidate	Votes	%	±%
Conservative	Edwin J. Northover	1393		
Labour	Henrietta A. Jackson	255		
Liberal Democrats	Henry A. Boyle	144		
Green	Daniel P. Perrett	102		
Turnout				
Conservative hold		Swing		

The by-election was called following the death of Cllr John Walter.

=== 2010-2014 ===
Larkswood by-election, 12 July 2012
Party	Candidate	Votes	%	±%
Conservative	John Moss	1392		
Labour	Peter Woodrow	472		
Liberal Democrats	Graham Woolnough	79		
Green	Bill Measure	70		
National Liberal	James O'Rourke	64		
Turnout			24.4%	
Conservative hold		Swing		

The by-election was called following the resignation of Cllr Edwin Northover.

=== 2014-2018 ===
William Morris by-election, 29 June 2017
Party	Candidate	Votes	%	±%
Labour	Umar Ali	1,923	68.4	+11.5
Green	Rebecca Tully	524	18.6	+1.8
Conservative	Afzal Akram	365	13.0	+6.2
Turnout		2,813		
Labour hold		Swing		

The by-election was triggered by the death of Councillor Nadeem Ali, of the Labour Party.

=== 2018-2022 ===
Hatch Lane by-election, 6 May 2021
Party	Candidate	Votes	%	±%
Conservative	Justin Halabi	2,072	50.9	+3.2
Labour	Catherine Burns	1,565	38.4	+2.3
Green	Robert Tatam	266	6.5	−3.4
Liberal Democrats	Henry Boyle	170	4.2	−2.0
Majority		507	12.4	
Turnout		4,073		
Conservative hold		Swing		

The by-election was triggered by the death of Councillor Geoff Walker, of the Conservative Party.

Grove Green by-election, 10 June 2021
Party	Candidate	Votes	%	±%
Labour	Uzma Rasool	1,301	58.4	+4.1
Liberal Democrats	Arran Angus	541	24.3	+0.6
Green	Mark Dawes	205	9.2	−2.9
Conservative	Shahamima Khan	142	6.4	−0.1
TUSC	Kevin Parslow	40	1.8	−1.6
Majority		760	34.1	
Turnout		2,229		
Labour hold		Swing		

The by-election was triggered by the death of Councillor Chris Robbins, of the Labour Party.

Lea Bridge by-election, 10 June 2021
Party	Candidate	Votes	%	±%
Labour	Jennifer Whilby	1,176	50.0	−8.6
Independent	Claire Weiss	441	18.8	+18.8
Conservative	Sazimet Imre	436	18.6	+8.3
Green	RoseMary Warrington	181	7.7	−9.0
Liberal Democrats	Naomi McCarthy	116	4.9	−1.5
Majority		735	31.3	
Turnout		2,350		
Labour hold		Swing		

The by-election was triggered by the resignation of Councillor Yemi Osho, of the Labour Party.

=== 2022-2026 ===
Higham Hill by-election, 26 October 2023
Party	Candidate	Votes	%	±%
Labour	Shumon Ali-Rahman	924	57.3	
Liberal Democrats	Alex Lewis	268	16.6	
Green	Abigail Woodman	198	12.3	
TUSC	Nancy Taaffe	144	8.9	
Conservative	Moufazzal Bhuiyan	78	4.8	
Majority		656	40.7	
Turnout		1,612		
Labour hold		Swing		

The by-election was triggered by the resignation of Cllr Alistair Strathern MP, of the Labour Party.
