= 2002 Waltham Forest London Borough Council election =

- 2 May 2002

All 60 seats up for election to Waltham Forest London Borough Council 31 seats needed for a majority
- Registered: 161,138
- Turnout: 55,426, 34.40% (▲0.21)

	First party	Second party	Third party
Leader	Anthony J. Buckley	Unknown	Unknown
Party	Labour	Conservative	Liberal Democrats
Leader since	1998	Unknown	Unknown
Leader's seat	Lea Bridge	Unknown	Unknown
Last election	30 seats, 43.08%	15 seats, 23.36%	12 seats, 31.31%
Seats before	30	15	11
Seats won	29	18	13
Seat change	▼1	▲3	▲1
Popular vote	56,420	43,472	48,489
Percentage	36.36%	28.02%	31.25%
Swing	▼6.72	▲4.66	▼0.06
- Map of the results of the 2002 Waltham Forest council election. Conservatives in blue, Labour in red and Liberal Democrats in yellow.
Council control before election
Labour
Council control after election
No Overall Control

Elections to Waltham Forest Council were held in May 2002. The whole council was up for election for the first time since the 1998 election. These elections were the first held on new ward boundaries which increased the total number of Councillors by 3, from 57 to 60.

Waltham Forest local elections are held every four years, with the next due in 2006.

Despite losing their majority, Labour were able to continue in administration, in a minority.

== Background ==
As part of a major redistricting, Waltham Forest council along with every other Londo Borough Council created new wards, eliminated some and expanded others. The results of this redistricting were as follows:

=== Wards Created ===
- Hale End and Highams Park - Formed from the entirety of Hale End ward and well as a south eastern section of Larkswood ward.
- Markhouse - Formed from northern section of the St James Street ward.
- William Morris - Formed from parts of Chapel End, High Street, Hoe Street and Lloyd Park wards

=== Wards Eliminated ===
- Hale End - Formed part of the new Hale End and Highams Park ward.
- Lloyd Park - Land divided by the Chapel End and Higham Hill wards as well as the new William Morris ward.
- St James Street - Land divided by Hoe Street and Lea Bridge wards as well as the new Markhouse ward.

=== Wards Expanded ===
- Endlebury - Increased from 2 seats to 3
- Higham Hill - Increased from 2 seats to 3

In between this election and the 1998 election, there was only one by-election held, however this did not result in the seat changing parties. In addition to this there was also a seat that became vacant without enough time to hold a by-election to fill it before the local elections. This meant that the council composition just before the election was as follows:

↓
30	15	11	1
Labour	Lib Dem	Conservative	Vacant

== Election result ==
2002 Waltham Forest London Borough Council local elections
Party	Seats	Gains	Losses	Net gain/loss	Seats %	Votes %	Votes	+/−
Labour	29	6	7 (Note: Includes loses from seats being eliminated)	▼1	48.33	36.36	56,420	▼6.72
Conservative	18	5	2	▲3	30.00	28.02	43,472	▲4.66
Liberal Democrats	13	1	0	▲1	21.67	31.25	48,489	▼0.06
Green	0	0	0	Steady	0.00	2.89	4,487	▲1.19
London Socialist	0	0	0	Steady	0.00	0.79	1,230	New
BNP	0	0	0	Steady	0.00	0.37	567	▲0.23
Socialist	0	0	0	Steady	0.00	0.31	486	New
Total	60						155,151	

After the election the composition of the council was as follows:

↓
29	13	18
Labour	Lib Dem	Conservative

== Ward Results ==
(*) - Indicates an incumbent candidate

(†) - Indicates an incumbent candidate standing in a different ward

=== Cann Hall ===
Cann Hall (3)
Party	Candidate	Votes	%	±%
Liberal Democrats	Keith Rayner*	1,590	60.51	▼3.75
Liberal Democrats	Elizabeth Philips*	1,574		
Liberal Democrats	Carol Southall	1,567		
Labour	Dennis Bell	761	28.09	▼3.72
Labour	Brian Madican	738		
Labour	Andrew Lock^{†} (Note: Lock was a sitting councillor representing the Grove Green ward)	697		
London Socialist	Sally Labern	165	6.33	New
Conservative	Jeremy Evans^{†} (Note: Evans was a sitting councillor representing the Valley ward)	139	5.07	▲1.14
Conservative	Mary Neilson-Hansen	130		
Conservative	Corinna Vinicombe	127		
Registered electors		7,741		▲203
Turnout		2,657	34.32	▼3.45
Rejected ballots		5	0.19	▼0.44
Liberal Democrats win (new boundaries)				
Liberal Democrats win (new boundaries)				
Liberal Democrats win (new boundaries)				

=== Cathall ===
Cathall (3)
Party	Candidate	Votes	%	±%
Labour	Milton Martin*	1,104	64.83	▲2.66
Labour	Shameem Highfield*	1,046		
Labour	Terence Wheeler*	996		
Liberal Democrats	Robert Neal	323	19.20	▲1.74
Liberal Democrats	Peter Mason	321		
Liberal Democrats	Mark Southall	288		
Conservative	Andrew Butler	270	15.97	▲6.51
Conservative	Pervalz Akhtar	268		
Conservative	Anne Pryor	217		
Registered electors		7,005		▼407
Turnout		1,767	25.22	▲0.69
Rejected ballots		10	0.57	▲0.02
Labour win (new boundaries)				
Labour win (new boundaries)				
Labour win (new boundaries)				

=== Chapel End ===
Chapel End (3)
Party	Candidate	Votes	%	±%
Liberal Democrats	Robert Belam*	1,468	55.33	▲7.65
Liberal Democrats	Robert Carey^{†} (Note: Carey was a sitting councillor representing the Higham Hill ward)	1,405		
Liberal Democrats	John Macklin	1,341		
Labour	Jack Kaye	744	26.38	▼3.76
Labour	Paul Redcliffe	642		
Labour	Faiz Yunis	623		
Conservative	Nial Finlayson	491	18.29	▲0.08
Conservative	Andrea Stevenson	454		
Conservative	Karl Lee	448		
Registered electors		8,120		▲295
Turnout		2,699	33.24	▼5.14
Rejected ballots		16	0.59	▲0.09
Liberal Democrats win (new boundaries)				
Liberal Democrats win (new boundaries)				
Liberal Democrats win (new boundaries)				

=== Chingford Green ===
Chingford Green(3)
Party	Candidate	Votes	%	±%
Conservative	Derek Arnold*	1,821	56.12	▼2.08
Conservative	Michael Fish*	1,814		
Conservative	Michael Lewis*	1,721		
Liberal Democrats	Henry Boyle	664	19.54	▼2.02
Liberal Democrats	Joan Carder	606		
Liberal Democrats	Ian Paterson	595		
Labour	Mary Lambert	508	15.42	▼4.81
Labour	Elizabeth Lee	506		
Labour	James Payne	458		
BNP	Tracy-Jane Flaxton	308	8.91	New
BNP	Glenn Hardcastle	259		
Registered electors		7,870		▼1,064
Turnout		3,256	41.37	▲4.49
Rejected ballots		8	0.25	▼4.49
Conservative win (new boundaries)				
Conservative win (new boundaries)				
Conservative win (new boundaries)				

=== Endlebury ===
Endlebury (3)
Party	Candidate	Votes	%	±%
Conservative	Peter Herrington*	1,959	67.98	▲5.72
Conservative	Andrew Hemsted	1,909		
Conservative	Mladen Jovcic*	1,890		
Labour	Yasmin Beg	514	16.85	▼0.58
Labour	Azra Chaudhry	457		
Labour	Jill Renshaw	456		
Liberal Democrats	Violet Wells	437	15.17	▲0.41
Liberal Democrats	Kathleen Mudie	435		
Liberal Democrats	Edward Carder	413		
Registered electors		7,970		▲1,701
Turnout		3,020	37.89	▲3.04
Rejected ballots		7	0.23	▼0.18
Conservative win (new boundaries)				
Conservative win (new boundaries)				
Conservative win (new seat)				

=== Forest ===
Forest (3)
Party	Candidate	Votes	%	±%
Labour	Jane Duran^{†} (Note: Duran was a sitting councillor representing the Grove Green ward)	1,253	37.89	▼16.06
Labour	Kabal Dhillon*	1,239		
Labour	Mohammed Rahman*	1,100		
Liberal Democrats	Meher Khan	908	28.20	▼8.76
Liberal Democrats	Mohammed Shafiq	893		
Liberal Democrats	Syed Hashmi	872		
Green	Rosalind Bedlow	395	12.50	New
Conservative	Julien Foster	358	10.20	▲1.11
Conservative	Raymond Luker	317		
Conservative	Richard Glah	292		
CPA	Jean Farmer	247	7.82	New
London Socialist	Roland Rance	107	3.39	New
Registered electors		7,954		▲202
Turnout		2,801	35.22	▼3.80
Rejected ballots		12	0.43	▼0.73
Labour win (new boundaries)				
Labour win (new boundaries)				
Labour win (new boundaries)				

=== Grove Green ===
Grove Green (3)
Party	Candidate	Votes	%	±%
Labour	Tarsem Bhogal*	1,169	39.05	▼8.84
Liberal Democrats	Jennifer Sullivan	1,103	39.09	▲6.79
Labour	Christopher Robbins	1,081		
Liberal Democrats	Paul Olford	1,052		
Liberal Democrats	Neal Chubb	1,048		
Labour	Peter Woodrow	949		
Green	Helen Griffith	265	7.93	▼3.63
Conservative	Mohammed Qureshi	235	7.96	▼0.29
Conservative	Joan Devine	226		
Green	Maureen Measure	218		
Conservative	Derek Pryor	191		
Green	William Measure	167		
London Socialist	Thomas Taylor	163	5.97	New
Registered electors		8,513		▲731
Turnout		2,792	32.80	▲1.46
Rejected ballots		5	0.18	▼1.09
Labour win (new boundaries)				
Labour win (new boundaries)				
Labour win (new boundaries)				

=== Hale End and Highams Park ===
Hale End and Highams Park (3)
Party	Candidate	Votes	%	±%
Conservative	Lesley Finlayson^{†} (Note: Finlayson was a sitting councillor representing Hale End ward)	1,396	46.63	New
Conservative	Matthew Davis	1,380		
Conservative	Timothy Croot	1,355		
Liberal Democrats	John Beanse	1,122	36.57	New
Liberal Democrats	Mark Speed	1,081		
Liberal Democrats	Keith Wenden	1,037		
Labour	Yasmin Nicholson-St Hill	529	16.81	New
Labour	Mohammad Khan	496		
Labour	Muhammed Rachyal	464		
Registered electors		7,800		New
Turnout		3,139	40.24	New
Rejected ballots		3	0.10	New
Conservative win (new seat)				
Conservative win (new seat)				
Conservative win (new seat)				

=== Hatch Lane ===
Hatch Lane (3)
Party	Candidate	Votes	%	±%
Conservative	Marion Fitzgerald*	1,756	55.20	▼11.47
Conservative	Geoffrey Walker*	1,664		
Conservative	Laurie Braham*	1,624		
Labour	Claire Irvine	855	26.41	▼10.65
Labour	Gerard Lyons	833		
Labour	Margaret Sorungbe	725		
Liberal Democrats	David Young	348	10.39	▼1.40
Liberal Democrats	Janel Hoskins	323		
Liberal Democrats	Jane Morgan	278		
Green	Robert Tatam	244	8.01	▲0.58
Registered electors		7,881		▼372
Turnout		3,050	38.70	▲3.00
Rejected ballots		8	0.26	▼0.18
Conservative win (new boundaries)				
Conservative win (new boundaries)				
Conservative win (new boundaries)				

=== High Street ===
High Street (3)
Party	Candidate	Votes	%	±%
Labour	David Blunt*	1,654	41.97	▼5.71
Labour	Simon Wright	1,503		
Labour	Narinder Matharoo^{†} (Note: Matharoo was a sitting councillor representing the Lloyd Park ward)	1,436		
Liberal Democrats	Robert Wheatley*	1,393	36.05	▼6.86
Liberal Democrats	Mohammad Diwan	1,331		
Liberal Democrats	Franklyn Georges	1,221		
Green	Gary Lancet	405	11.10	New
Conservative	Atta Yunis	287	7.29	▼2.12
Conservative	Muhammad Shabbir	282		
Conservative	Imran Ulhaq	229		
Communist	Anne Kruthoffer	131	3.59	New
Registered electors		8,521		▲547
Turnout		3,501	41.09	▲2.39
Rejected ballots		12	0.34	▼0.37
Labour win (new boundaries)				
Labour win (new boundaries)				
Labour win (new boundaries)				

=== Higham Hill ===
Higham Hill (3)
Party	Candidate	Votes	%	±%
Liberal Democrats	Peter Dunphy	1,246	48.42	▲3.72
Liberal Democrats	Peter Woolcott*	1,231		
Liberal Democrats	Sean Meiszner	1,184		
Labour	Peter Barnett	1,101	41.93	▲6.78
Labour	Geraldine Reardon	1,041		
Labour	Marcia Douet	1,028		
Conservative	Clive Alexander	266	9.65	▲1.11
Conservative	Darlinton Greenaway	240		
Conservative	Laurance Wedderburn	224		
Registered electors		7,674		▲2,792
Turnout		2,676	34.87	▼1.10
Rejected ballots		15	0.56	▲0.28
Liberal Democrats win (new boundaries)				
Liberal Democrats win (new boundaries)				
Liberal Democrats win (new seat)				

=== Hoe Street ===
Hoe Street (3)
Party	Candidate	Votes	%	±%
Labour	Sylvia Poulsen*	1,143	42.70	▼8.63
Labour	Mohammed Nasim*	1,114		
Labour	Eric Sizer*	1,105		
Conservative	Ashgar Ali	559	20.26	▲3.12
Conservative	Brian Clarke	529		
Conservative	Mohammed Malik	507		
Green	Stephen Lambert	463	15.86	▼1.39
Liberal Democrats	Morwenna Blewett	443	15.54	▲1.26
Liberal Democrats	Frank Blewett	408		
Green	Richard Burkett	404		
Green	Elena Sproston	382		
Liberal Democrats	Michael Harkin	373		
London Socialist	Cecilia Prosper	148	5.64	New
Registered electors		8,464		▼537
Turnout		2,742	32.40	▲1.26
Rejected ballots		11	0.40	▼0.35
Labour win (new boundaries)				
Labour win (new boundaries)				
Labour win (new boundaries)				

=== Larkswood ===
Larkswood (3)
Party	Candidate	Votes	%	±%
Conservative	Kathleen Gosling	1,670	63.09	▲11.38
Conservative	John Walter*	1,639		
Conservative	Eric Williams*	1,601		
Labour	Carolyn Brown	595	22.41	▼10.87
Labour	John Brown	587		
Labour	Gillian Leadbetter	562		
Liberal Democrats	Cynthia Wenden	386	14.50	▼0.51
Liberal Democrats	Geraldine McElarney	376		
Liberal Democrats	Graham Woolnough^{†} (Note: Woolnough was a sitting councillor representing the Chapel End ward)	366		
Registered electors		8,111		▼1,975
Turnout		2,752	33.93	▲3.71
Rejected ballots		5	0.18	▼0.21
Conservative win (new boundaries)				
Conservative win (new boundaries)				
Conservative win (new boundaries)				

=== Lea Bridge ===
Lea Bridge (3)
Party	Candidate	Votes	%	±%
Labour	Anthony Buckley*	1,207	53.25	▼1.38
Labour	Masood Ahmad	1,126		
Labour	Stella Creasy	1,110		
Liberal Democrats	Kay-Lorraine Andrews	536	20.40	▼7.93
Conservative	Mohammad Riaz	463	20.79	▲3.75
Conservative	Mohammed Bhatti	445		
Conservative	Muhammad Shah	436		
Liberal Democrats	Ellen Sowie	427		
Liberal Democrats	Dave Raval	356		
London Socialist	Terry Calvert	120	5.57	New
Registered electors		8,810		▲992
Turnout		2,316	26.29	▼4.54
Rejected ballots		7	0.30	▼0.53
Labour win (new boundaries)				
Labour win (new boundaries)				
Labour win (new boundaries)				

=== Leyton ===
Leyton (3)
Party	Candidate	Votes	%	±%
Liberal Democrats	Loretta Hodges*	1,593	60.85	▲11.25
Liberal Democrats	Robert Sullivan*	1,552		
Liberal Democrats	Barry Smith	1,494		
Labour	Grace Chambers	883	33.12	▼6.46
Labour	Crispin St Hill	836		
Labour	Nicholas Russell	806		
Conservative	Peter Smith	174	6.03	▲3.02
Conservative	Janet James	167		
Conservative	Roger Wheeler	119		
Registered electors		8,240		▲395
Turnout		2,678	32.50	▼10.11
Rejected ballots		7	0.26	▼0.22
Liberal Democrats win (new boundaries)				
Liberal Democrats win (new boundaries)				
Liberal Democrats win (new boundaries)				

=== Leytonstone ===
Leytonstone (3)
Party	Candidate	Votes	%	±%
Labour	Jennifer Gray*	1,173	38.11	▼9.42
Labour	Ian Leslie* (Note: Leslie was elected in a by-election triggered by the resignation of Cllr Huw Morgan-Thomas in 1998)	1,154		
Labour	Clyde Loakes*	1,106		
Liberal Democrats	Nazir Butt	1,027	33.87	▲4.76
Liberal Democrats	Jonathan Fryer	1,014		
Liberal Democrats	John Howard	1,010		
Green	Mark Dawes	450	14.99	▲6.00
Conservative	Patricia Scott	226	7.17	▼0.95
Conservative	Carol Johns	217		
Conservative	David Vinicombe	203		
London Socialist	Susan Catten	176	5.86	New
Registered electors		7,814		▲283
Turnout		2,732	34.96	▼0.13
Rejected ballots		5	0.18	▼0.27
Labour win (new boundaries)				
Labour win (new boundaries)				
Labour win (new boundaries)				

=== Markhouse ===
Markhouse (3)
Party	Candidate	Votes	%	±%
Labour	Diana Murray^{†} (Note: Murray, Kamal and Smith were all sitting councillors representing the St James Street ward)	994	38.55	New
Labour	Tahir Kamal^{†}	934		
Labour	Graham Smith^{†}	908		
Conservative	Meharban Hussain	547	21.50	New
Conservative	Yasin Khan	527		
Conservative	Aftab Iqbal	508		
Green	Judith Stubbings	416	16.96	New
Liberal Democrats	Peter Hatton	413	16.37	New
Liberal Democrats	Jeremt Dauncey	390		
Socialist	Louise Thompson	177	6.61	New
Socialist	Suzanne Muna	172		
Socialist	Kevin Parslow	137		
Registered electors		8,034		New
Turnout		2,277	28.34	New
Rejected ballots		14	0.61	New
Labour win (new seat)				
Labour win (new seat)				
Labour win (new seat)				

=== Valley ===
Valley (3)
Party	Candidate	Votes	%	±%
Conservative	John Gover*	1,570	55.79	▼10.27
Conservative	Alan Siggers	1,527		
Conservative	David Divine	1,521		
Labour	Margaret Broadley*	987	32.93	▼8.69
Labour	Aktar Beg	886		
Labour	Gary Martin	853		
Liberal Democrats	Barbara Young	334	11.28	▼1.57
Liberal Democrats	Keith Hardy	329		
Liberal Democrats	Shahnaz Rashid	271		
Registered electors		7,902		▼352
Turnout		2,925	37.02	▲7.30
Rejected ballots		7	0.24	▼0.49
Conservative win (new boundaries)				
Conservative win (new boundaries)				
Conservative win (new boundaries)				

=== William Morris ===
William Morris (3)
Party	Candidate	Votes	%	±%
Labour	Martin O'Connor^{†} (Note: O'Connor was a sitting councillor representing the Lloyd Park ward)	1,326	52.26	New
Labour	Liaquat Ali^{†} (Note: Ali was a sitting councillor representing the High Street ward)	1,285		
Labour	Jon Wilson	1,256		
Liberal Democrats	Jacquline Tidmarsh	648	23.07	New
Liberal Democrats	Richard Tidmarsh	554		
Liberal Democrats	Aym Wadud	505		
Conservative	Rachel Bettelley	391	14.29	New
Conservative	John Moss	363		
Conservative	Kabir Sabar	303		
London Socialist	Lee Rock	256	10.38	New
Registered electors		8,271		New
Turnout		2,552	30.85	New
Rejected ballots		11	0.43	New
Labour win (new seat)				
Labour win (new seat)				
Labour win (new seat)				

=== Wood Street ===
Wood Street (3)
Party	Candidate	Votes	%	±%
Labour	Angela Bean*	1,361	41.95	▲0.80
Labour	Paul Devaney	1,230		
Labour	Richard Sweden	1,187		
Liberal Democrats	Paula Claytonsmith	1,021	33.15	▼3.99
Liberal Democrats	Lindsay Collier	988		
Liberal Democrats	Mashoodul Qureshi	977		
Conservative	Camille Alexander	465	14.21	▲3.01
Conservative	Jemma Hemsted	414		
Conservative	Jude Lobendhan	401		
Green	Timothy Baker	240	7.53	▼2.98
Green	Christine Olende	228		
Green	Sallie Poppleton	210		
London Socialist	Brenda Strudwick	95	3.16	New
Registered electors		8,443		▼145
Turnout		3,094	36.65	▼1.95
Rejected ballots		8	0.26	▼0.16
Labour win (new boundaries)				
Labour win (new boundaries)				
Labour win (new boundaries)				
