= 2006 Waltham Forest London Borough Council election =

- 4 May 2006

All 60 seats to Waltham Forest London Borough Council 31 seats needed for a majority
	First party	Second party	Third party
Leader	Clyde Loakes	Keith Rayner	Geoffrey Walker
Party	Labour	Liberal Democrats	Conservative
Leader's seat	Leytonstone	Cann Hall	Hatch Lane
Last election	29 seats, 34.9%	13 seats, 29.9%	18 seats, 26.4%
Seats before	27	15	18
Seats won	26	19	15
Seat change	▼1	▲4	▼3
Percentage	33.8%	32.4%	27.7%
- Map of the results of the 2006 Waltham Forest council election. Conservatives in blue, Labour in red and Liberal Democrats in yellow.
Council control before election
No Overall Control
Council control after election
No Overall Control

The 2006 Waltham Forest Council elections, were held on 4 May 2006 in Waltham Forest, England. The whole council was up for election for the first time since the 2002 election.

Waltham Forest local elections are held every four years, with the next due in 2010.

Following the elections, a coalition agreement was formed between Labour and the Liberal Democrats.

== Eligibility ==
All locally registered electors (British, Irish, Commonwealth and European Union citizens) who were aged 18 or over on Thursday, 4 May 2006 were entitled to vote in the local elections. Those who were temporarily away from their ordinary address (for example, away working, on holiday, in student accommodation or in hospital) were also entitled to vote in the local elections, although those who had moved abroad and registered as overseas electors cannot vote in the local elections. It is possible to register to vote at more than one address (such as a university student who had a term-time address and lives at home during holidays) at the discretion of the local Electoral Register Office, but it remains an offence to vote more than once in the same local government election.

== Composition before election ==
Elected in 2002		Before election	
Party	Seats	Party	Seats
Labour	29	Labour	27
Conservative	18	Conservative	18
Liberal Democrats	13	Liberal Democrats	15

== Election result ==
Waltham Forest local election result 2006
Party	Seats	Gains	Losses	Net gain/loss	Seats %	Votes %	Votes	+/−
Labour	26	2	5	-3	43.3	33.8	57,959	
Liberal Democrats	19	8	2	+6	31.7	32.4	55,628	
Conservative	15	0	3	-3	24.0	27.7	46,981	
Green	0	0	0	0	0.0	4.7	8,094	
Respect	0	0	0	0	0.0	1.0	1,775	
BNP	0	0	0	0	0.0	0.3	509	
UKIP	0	0	0	0	0.0	0.2	270	
Socialist Alternative	0	0	0	0	0.0	0.1	245	
Independent	0	0	0	0	0.0	0.1	178	

== Results by ward ==
The ward results listed below are based on the changes from the 2002 elections, not taking into account any mid-term by-elections or party defections.

Cann Hall
Party	Candidate	Votes	%
Liberal Democrats	Liz Phillips	1,345	
Liberal Democrats	Keith Rayner	1,338	
Liberal Democrats	Laura Sheppard	1,197	
Labour	Shah Ahmed	1,003	
Labour	Victoria Baffour-Awuah	975	
Labour	Richard Devaney	914	
Green	Pat Howie	337	
Conservative	Paul Canal	247	
Conservative	Kathleen Gosling	201	
Conservative	Mary Neilson-Hansen	200	
Turnout			34.5%
Liberal Democrats hold			
Liberal Democrats hold			
Liberal Democrats hold			

Cathall
Party	Candidate	Votes	%
Labour	Milton Martin	1,117	
Labour	Shameem Highfield	1,072	
Labour	Terence Wheeler	982	
Liberal Democrats	Michael Hunt	955	
Liberal Democrats	Shahid Majid	940	
Liberal Democrats	Clyde Kitson	933	
Green	Maureen Measure	270	
Conservative	Graham Millington	178	
Conservative	Cajetan Iwunze	159	
Conservative	Pamela Jovcic	147	
Independent	Joan Devine	93	
Independent	Andrew Butler	85	
Turnout			34.0%
Labour hold			
Labour hold			
Labour hold			

Chapel End
Party	Candidate	Votes	%
Liberal Democrats	Bob Belam	1,653	
Liberal Democrats	Bob Carey	1,537	
Liberal Democrats	John Macklin	1,420	
Labour	David Blunt	663	
Labour	Stephen Terry	632	
Labour	Sabha Akhtar	616	
Conservative	Brian Clarke	459	
Conservative	Josephine Gatward	429	
Green	Richard Burkett	419	
Conservative	John Phelan	373	
Turnout			35.7%
Liberal Democrats hold			
Liberal Democrats hold			
Liberal Democrats hold			

Chingford Green
Party	Candidate	Votes	%
Conservative	Derek Arnold	2,288	
Conservative	Michael Lewis	2,279	
Conservative	Graham Sinclair	2,199	
Liberal Democrats	Keith Wendon	622	
Liberal Democrats	Joan Carder	605	
Liberal Democrats	Ian Paterson	573	
Labour	Farah Beg	359	
Labour	William Bayliss	357	
Labour	Jeffrey Blay	345	
Turnout			43.0%
Conservative hold			
Conservative hold			
Conservative hold			

Endlebury
Party	Candidate	Votes	%
Conservative	Peter Herrington	2,227	
Conservative	Mladen Jovcic	2,063	
Conservative	Matthew Davis	2,056	
Labour	Kenneth Kennedy	425	
Green	Joan Allen	398	
Liberal Democrats	Edward Carder	351	
Liberal Democrats	Kathleen Mudie	350	
Liberal Democrats	Violet Wells	345	
Labour	Miles Washbrook	329	
Labour	Frances Manjra	322	
Turnout			40.4%
Conservative hold			
Conservative hold			
Conservative hold			

Forest
Party	Candidate	Votes	%
Liberal Democrats	Farooq Qureshi	1,505	
Liberal Democrats	Imran Abrahim	1,490	
Labour	Faiz Yunis	1,289	
Liberal Democrats	Murle Mitchell	1,268	
Labour	Kabal Singh Dhillon	1,159	
Labour	Gerry Lyons	1,029	
Green	Rosalind Bedlow	534	
Conservative	Jean Farmer	508	
Conservative	Sean Phillips	414	
Conservative	Nial Finlayson	399	
Turnout			41.5%
Liberal Democrats gain from Labour			
Liberal Democrats gain from Labour			
Labour hold			

Grove Green
Party	Candidate	Votes	%
Labour	Tarsem Singh Bhogal	1,517	
Labour	Chris Robbins	1,430	
Labour	Anna Mbachu	1,356	
Liberal Democrats	Jennifer Sullivan	1,286	
Liberal Democrats	Neal Chubb	1,173	
Liberal Democrats	Paul Olford	1,171	
Green	William Measure	480	
Conservative	Nicola Devlin	270	
Conservative	Alan Gough	265	
Conservative	Derek Pryor	235	
Turnout			38.4%
Labour hold			
Labour hold			
Labour gain from Liberal Democrats			

Hale End and Highams Park
Party	Candidate	Votes	%
Liberal Democrats	John Beanse	1,617	
Liberal Democrats	Noel Penstone	1,462	
Liberal Democrats	Sheila Smith-Pryor	1,453	
Conservative	Lesley Finlayson	1,434	
Conservative	Andrew Hemsted	1,363	
Conservative	Julien Foster	1,346	
Labour	Noel Hayes	437	
Labour	Ann Molyneux	404	
Green	Sallie Poppleton	367	
Labour	Martyn Bellamy	327	
Turnout			46.6%
Liberal Democrats gain from Conservative			
Liberal Democrats gain from Conservative			
Liberal Democrats gain from Conservative			

Hatch Lane
Party	Candidate	Votes	%
Conservative	Marion Fitzgerald	1,651	
Conservative	Geoffrey Walker	1,548	
Conservative	Laurie Braham	1,478	
Labour	Martin Dore	529	
Labour	Sheila Dore	526	
BNP	John Pearce	509	
Labour	Shaheen Rafique	406	
Liberal Democrats	Marc Jones	404	
Green	Robert Tatam	380	
Liberal Democrats	Jeremy Dauncey	360	
Liberal Democrats	Jane Morgan	337	
Turnout			37.8%
Conservative hold			
Conservative hold			
Conservative hold			

High Street
Party	Candidate	Votes	%
Labour	Liaquat Ali	1,472	
Liberal Democrats	Johar Khan	1,468	
Liberal Democrats	James O'Rourke	1,453	
Liberal Democrats	Dave Raval	1,372	
Labour	Diana Murray	1,349	
Labour	Narinder Matharoo	1,224	
Green	Denethor House	604	
Conservative	Edward Stacey	309	
Conservative	John Moss	269	
Conservative	Rachel Wedderburn	268	
Socialist Alternative	Claire Buddle	245	
Turnout			43.1%
Labour hold			
Liberal Democrats gain from Labour			
Liberal Democrats gain from Labour			

Higham Hill
Party	Candidate	Votes	%
Liberal Democrats	Sean Meiszner	1,303	
Liberal Democrats	Peter Woollcott	1,271	
Liberal Democrats	Patrick Smith	1,188	
Labour	Karen Bellamy	1,031	
Labour	Marcia Douet	883	
Labour	Peter Woodrow	859	
Green	Liam Kerr	327	
Conservative	Jemma Hemsted	309	
Conservative	Ayhan Kizil	258	
Conservative	Gerald King	214	
Turnout			34.7%
Liberal Democrats hold			
Liberal Democrats hold			
Liberal Democrats hold			

Hoe Street
Party	Candidate	Votes	%
Labour	Naz Sarkar	1,351	
Labour	Saima Mahmud	1,314	
Labour	Eric Sizer	1,286	
Green	Stephen Lambert	785	
Liberal Democrats	Jacqueline Tidmarsh	605	
Liberal Democrats	Daniel Pond	592	
Conservative	Sophia Khan	530	
Conservative	Tara Draper-Stumm	475	
Conservative	Timothy Croot	469	
Liberal Democrats	Richard Tidmarsh	399	
Turnout			34.7%
Labour hold			
Labour hold			
Labour hold			

Larkswood
Party	Candidate	Votes	%
Conservative	Nicholas Buckmaster	1,653	
Conservative	John Walter	1,651	
Conservative	Eric Williams	1,545	
Labour	Carolyn Brown	476	
Labour	Anne Garrett	465	
Labour	John Brown	461	
Liberal Democrats	Cynthia Wenden	358	
Liberal Democrats	Graham Woolnough	345	
Green	Bridget Kerr	294	
Liberal Democrats	Khizar Khan-Lodhi	290	
UKIP	Robert Brock	270	
Turnout			34.5%
Conservative hold			
Conservative hold			
Conservative hold			

Lea Bridge
Party	Candidate	Votes	%
Labour	Masood Ahmad	1,375	
Labour	Elizabeth Davies	1,327	
Labour	Afzal Akram	1,240	
Liberal Democrats	Nasar Malik	517	
Liberal Democrats	Maureen Lake	509	
Liberal Democrats	Frederick Lake	471	
Conservative	Barbara Miller	451	
Green	Elen Miles	429	
Conservative	Mahmood Noman	360	
Conservative	Ilkay Halabi	320	
Turnout			27.1%
Labour hold			
Labour hold			
Labour hold			

Leyton
Party	Candidate	Votes	%
Liberal Democrats	Naheed Qureshi	1,443	
Labour	Miranda Grell	1,427	
Liberal Democrats	Bob Sullivan	1,424	
Liberal Democrats	Barry Smith	1,399	
Labour	Simon Wright	1,245	
Labour	Nicholas Russell	1,242	
Green	Helen Griffith	253	
Conservative	Paul Braham	216	
Conservative	Anne Pryor	176	
Conservative	Colette Gosling	167	
Turnout			37.6%
Liberal Democrats hold			
Labour gain from Liberal Democrats			
Liberal Democrats hold			

Leytonstone
Party	Candidate	Votes	%
Labour	Marie Pye	1,431	
Labour	Clyde Loakes	1,352	
Labour	Jenny Gray	1,274	
Liberal Democrats	Nazir Butt	811	
Liberal Democrats	Mahmood Faiz	802	
Liberal Democrats	Marie Valery	710	
Green	Mark Dawes	594	
Conservative	Helen Johnson	389	
Respect	Peter Ashan	387	
Respect	Caroline Coleman	384	
Conservative	Raymond Luker	370	
Conservative	Roderick Milroy	338	
Turnout			38.8%
Labour hold			
Labour hold			
Labour hold			

Markhouse
Party	Candidate	Votes	%
Labour	Margaret Broadley	1,227	
Labour	Asim Mahmood	1,199	
Labour	Mohammad Asghar	1,174	
Liberal Democrats	Javed Azam	740	
Liberal Democrats	Munir Hussain	687	
Liberal Democrats	Frank Blewett	686	
Green	Judith Stubbings	570	
Respect	Mahtab Aziz	533	
Respect	Carole Vincent	471	
Conservative	Roger Hemsted	442	
Conservative	Bilal Mahmood	351	
Conservative	Eylem Kizil	336	
Turnout			36.3%
Labour hold			
Labour hold			
Labour hold			

Valley
Party	Candidate	Votes	%
Conservative	John Gover	1,710	
Conservative	Alan Siggers	1,638	
Conservative	Laurance Wedderburn	1,539	
Liberal Democrats	Henry Boyle	608	
Labour	Sivakumar Chelliah	546	
Liberal Democrats	Mohammad Malik	540	
Labour	Aktar Beg	526	
Liberal Democrats	Shahnaz Rashid	476	
Labour	Crispin St Hill	457	
Turnout			37.1%
Conservative hold			
Conservative hold			
Conservative hold			

William Morris
Party	Candidate	Votes	%
Labour	Geraldine Reardon	1,421	
Labour	Adam Gladstone	1,409	
Liberal Democrats	Bob Wheatley	1,288	
Labour	Khevyn Limbajee	1,253	
Liberal Democrats	Mohammad Diwan	1,217	
Liberal Democrats	Simon Jones	1,144	
Green	Alexandra Rowe	496	
Conservative	Emily Garrett	322	
Conservative	Ian Drury	319	
Conservative	Tim James	293	
Turnout			40.4%
Labour hold			
Labour hold			
Liberal Democrats gain from Labour			

Wood Street
Party	Candidate	Votes	%
Labour	Angela Bean	1,471	
Labour	Peter Barnett	1,383	
Labour	Richard Sweden	1,289	
Conservative	Laura McManus-Andrea	999	
Conservative	Halil Halabi	953	
Conservative	Aleksander Mazalon	926	
Liberal Democrats	Peter Hatton	671	
Liberal Democrats	Mazhar Iqbal	593	
Liberal Democrats	Mohammad Khan	558	
Green	Christine Olende	557	
Turnout			40.2%
Labour hold			
Labour hold			
Labour hold			
