= 2014 Waltham Forest London Borough Council election =

2014 local election in England

- 22 May 2014

All 60 seats to Waltham Forest London Borough Council 31 seats needed for a majority
	First party	Second party
Leader	Chris Robbins	Matt Davis
Party	Labour	Conservative
Leader's seat	Grove Green	Chingford Green
Last election	36 seats, 38.9%	18 seats, 24.9%
Seats won	44	16
Seat change	▲8	▼2
Popular vote	99,350	38,838
Percentage	52.9%	20.7%
Swing	▲14.0%	▼4.2%
- Map of the results of the 2014 Waltham Forest council election. Conservatives in blue and Labour in red.
Council control before election
Labour
Council control after election
Labour

The 2014 Waltham Forest Council election took place on 22 May 2014 to elect members of Waltham Forest Council in England. This was on the same day as other local elections.

== Eligibility ==
All locally registered electors (British, Irish, Commonwealth and European Union citizens) who were aged 18 or over on Thursday 22 May 2014 were entitled to vote in the local elections. Those who were temporarily away from their ordinary address (for example, away working, on holiday, in student accommodation or in hospital) were also entitled to vote in the local elections, although those who had moved abroad and registered as overseas electors cannot vote in the local elections. It is possible to register to vote at more than one address (such as a university student who had a term-time address and lives at home during holidays) at the discretion of the local Electoral Register Office, but it remains an offence to vote more than once in the same local government election.

== Composition before election ==
Elected in 2010		Before election	
Party	Seats	Party	Seats
Labour	36	Labour	35
Conservative	18	Conservative	18
Liberal Democrats	6	Liberal Democrats	6
Vacant	0	Vacant	1

== Election result ==
Waltham Forest Council election result 2014
Party	Seats	Gains	Losses	Net gain/loss	Seats %	Votes %	Votes	+/−
Labour	44	8	0	+8	73.3	52.9	99,350	+14.0
Conservative	16	0	2	-2	26.7	20.7	38,838	-4.2
Liberal Democrats	0	0	6	-6	0.0	13.5	25,357	-16.6
Green	0	0	0	0	0.0	5.6	10,482	+1.3
UKIP	0	0	0	0	0.0	3.8	7,122	+3.6
TUSC	0	0	0	0	0.0	2.9	5,482	+2.7
Independent	0	0	0	0	0.0	0.3	522	-1.1
Liberal	0	0	0	0	0.0	0.3	502	New

== Results by ward ==
The ward results listed below are based on the changes from the 2010 elections, not taking into account any mid-term by-elections or party defections.

Cann Hall
Party	Candidate	Votes	%	±%
Labour	Keith Rayner	1,779	56.4	+17.3
Labour	Patrick Edwards	1,682	53.3	+8.4
Labour	Sally Littlejohn	1,640	52.0	+9.6
Liberal Democrats	Liz Phillips*	985	31.2	−11.2
Liberal Democrats	Rupert Alexander	837	26.5	−12.6
Liberal Democrats	Adrian Trett	756	24.0	−7.9
Green	Pat Howie	401	12.7	+3.7
Conservative	Guilherme de Gouveia	264	8.4	−2.5
Conservative	Christopher Nott	226	7.2	−3.3
Conservative	Joseph Leport	196	6.2	−3.3
TUSC	Claire Laker-Mansfield	134	4.2	N/A
Turnout		3,154	34.9	
Labour hold				
Labour hold				
Labour gain from Liberal Democrats				

Cathall
Party	Candidate	Votes	%	±%
Labour	Naheed Asghar	1,851	70.5	+20.6
Labour	Terry Wheeler	1,782	67.8	+23.6
Labour	S.K.A. Highfield	1,715	65.3	+20.2
Green	Glyn Roberts	333	12.7	+5.1
UKIP	Sue Moorhead	262	10.0	N/A
Liberal Democrats	John Howard	198	7.5	−26.8
Conservative	Carol Chatfield	197	7.5	−3.6
Liberal Democrats	Clyde Kitson	183	7.0	−27.3
Conservative	Erol Cakirgoz	178	6.8	−2.9
Conservative	Jerry Leport	168	6.4	−2.6
Liberal Democrats	Pam Bertram	163	6.2	−25.3
TUSC	Marijerla Ratnaseelan	92	3.5	N/A
Turnout		2,627	31.1	
Labour hold				
Labour hold				
Labour hold				

Chapel End
Party	Candidate	Votes	%	±%
Labour	Louise Mitchell	1,953	55.1	+18.3
Labour	Paul Douglas	1,927	54.4	+14.2
Labour	Steve Terry	1,715	48.4	+14.8
Liberal Democrats	James Goodman	690	19.5	−5.2
Green	Sue Wheat	631	17.8	+7.9
Liberal Democrats	Tulat Raja	580	16.4	−7.4
Liberal Democrats	Sean Meiszner	575	16.2	−6.4
Conservative	Elliott Burton	510	14.4	−2.3
UKIP	Judith Chisholm-Benli	494	13.9	+8.4
Conservative	Kieran Sargent	445	12.6	−3.5
TUSC	Glenroy Watson	207	5.8	N/A
Turnout		3,545	37.5	
Labour hold				
Labour hold				
Labour hold				

Chingford Green
Party	Candidate	Votes	%	±%
Conservative	Matt Davis	1,659	50.3	−8.3
Conservative	Andy Hemsted	1,624	49.2	−8.2
Conservative	Nick Halebi	1,476	44.7	−13.2
UKIP	Martin Levin	915	27.7	N/A
Labour	Jeffrey Blay	700	21.2	+3.3
Labour	Martin Dore	628	19.0	+1.9
Labour	Neil Weeks	588	17.8	+3.7
Liberal Democrats	Joan Carder	262	7.9	−10.4
Independent	None of the Above	204	6.2	N/A
Liberal	Kathleen Mudie	169	5.1	N/A
TUSC	Manny Thain	105	3.2	N/A
Turnout		3,299	39.9	
Conservative hold				
Conservative hold				
Conservative hold				

Endlebury
Party	Candidate	Votes	%	±%
Conservative	Roy Berg	1,766	52.2	−2.5
Conservative	Peter Herrington	1,588	46.9	−3.1
Conservative	Caroline Erics	1,538	45.4	−3.6
UKIP	John O'Shea	942	27.8	N/A
Labour	Sheila Dore	780	23.0	+7.3
Labour	Kenneth Kennedy	765	22.6	+6.9
Labour	Peter Woodrow	628	18.6	+0.8
Green	Kevin O'Brien	399	11.8	+3.4
Liberal Democrats	Ted Cooke	232	6.9	−5.5
TUSC	Sarah Sachs-Eldridge	122	3.6	N/A
Turnout		3,385	40.3	
Conservative hold				
Conservative hold				
Conservative hold				

Forest
Party	Candidate	Votes	%	±%
Labour	Shabana Dhedhi	1,694	48.0	+10.3
Labour	Kastriot Berberi	1,636	46.4	+12.1
Labour	Gerry Lyons	1,545	43.8	+2.2
Liberal Democrats	Farooq Qureshi	1,136	32.2	−6.2
Liberal Democrats	Arfan Abrahim	997	28.3	−1.8
Liberal Democrats	Murle Mitchell	844	23.9	−4.9
Green	Daniel Ritman	504	14.3	+1.1
UKIP	Ron Bromley	303	8.6	N/A
Conservative	Julien Foster	296	8.4	−6.8
Conservative	Laurie Braham	272	7.7	−5.8
Conservative	Derek Pryor	264	7.5	−3.8
TUSC	Pat Brown	161	4.6	N/A
TUSC	Russell Pennington	88	2.5	N/A
TUSC	CEA Guiste	75	2.1	N/A
Turnout		3,529	39.9	
Labour hold				
Labour hold				
Labour gain from Liberal Democrats				

Grove Green
Party	Candidate	Votes	%	±%
Labour	Chris Robbins	1,858	50.5	+4.4
Labour	Anna Mbachu	1,751	47.6	+2.9
Labour	Khevyn Limbajee	1,686	45.8	+2.9
Liberal Democrats	Imran Mahmood	1,009	27.4	−5.7
Liberal Democrats	Naser Masood	865	23.5	−8.8
Liberal Democrats	Andrei Ilies	856	23.3	−7.5
Green	Bill Measure	507	13.8	+5.4
Green	Maureen Measure	485	13.2	+5.7
Conservative	Jacqueline Howe	345	9.4	−2.4
Conservative	Pervalz Khan	335	9.1	−2.9
Conservative	Lauren Smith	335	9.1	−2.6
TUSC	Nic Fripp	160	4.3	N/A
TUSC	Tim Roedel	86	2.3	N/A
Turnout		3,681	37.1	
Labour hold				
Labour hold				
Labour hold				

Hale End and Highams Park
Party	Candidate	Votes	%	±%
Conservative	Sheree Rackham	1,412	38.5	+0.8
Labour	Tony Bell	1,388	37.8	+12.2
Conservative	Paul Braham	1,377	37.5	+0.4
Conservative	Darshan Singh Sunger	1,286	35.0	+0.2
Labour	Simon Bottomley	1,250	34.1	+10.6
Labour	Jonathan Lloyd	1,108	30.2	+7.8
UKIP	Peter Woodrow	580	15.8	N/A
Green	Rebecca Redwood	497	13.5	N/A
Liberal Democrats	Gerry McGarry	343	9.3	−23.9
Liberal Democrats	Sheila Smith-Pryor	339	9.2	−24.2
Liberal Democrats	Jane Morgan	315	8.6	−24.2
TUSC	Danny Byrne	128	3.5	N/A
Turnout		3,670	42.6	
Conservative hold				
Labour gain from Conservative				
Conservative hold				

Hatch Lane
Party	Candidate	Votes	%	±%
Conservative	Marion Fitzgerald	1,485	46.9	−5.6
Conservative	Geoffrey Walker	1,249	39.4	−8.1
Conservative	Tim James	1,134	35.8	−12.1
Labour	Stephen Garrett	935	29.5	+4.4
UKIP	Paul Hillman	868	27.4	N/A
Labour	Graham Smith	743	23.4	+4.7
Labour	Nicholas Russell	741	23.4	+5.5
Green	Robert Tatam	575	18.1	+7.2
Liberal Democrats	Marc Jones	252	8.0	−13.4
TUSC	Sue Wills	152	4.8	N/A
Turnout		3,169	36.8	
Conservative hold				
Conservative hold				
Conservative hold				

High Street
Party	Candidate	Votes	%	±%
Labour	Clare Coghill	2,510	61.7	+22.4
Labour	Raja Anwar	2,191	53.9	+19.1
Labour	Liaquat Ali	2,095	51.5	+9.6
Liberal Democrats	Mahmood Hussain	741	18.2	−18.6
Liberal Democrats	Bob Wheatley	708	17.4	−17.2
Green	Harry Greenfield	708	17.4	+3.5
Liberal Democrats	Nelia Cetin	618	15.2	−15.6
Conservative	Michael Bamber	314	7.7	−1.4
Conservative	Rachel Wedderburn	267	6.6	−2.5
Conservative	Shane Clapham	251	6.2	−2.6
TUSC	Nancy Taaffe	240	5.9	N/A
TUSC	Marvin Hay	195	4.8	N/A
Independent	James O'Rourke	163	4.0	−26.8
Independent	John Macklin	155	3.8	N/A
TUSC	Senan Uthayasenan	152	3.7	N/A
Turnout		4,068	40.9	
Labour hold				
Labour hold				
Labour gain from Liberal Democrats				

Higham Hill
Party	Candidate	Votes	%	±%
Labour	Karen Bellamy	2,275	67.4	+22.5
Labour	Tim Bennett-Goodman	2,098	62.1	+21.7
Labour	Alistair Strathern	1,921	56.9	+17.8
Liberal Democrats	Tahir Raja	516	15.3	−23.0
Liberal Democrats	Peter Woollcott	497	14.7	−20.7
Liberal Democrats	Patrick Smith	475	14.1	−20.7
UKIP	David Bracegirdle	450	13.3	+7.9
Conservative	Kathy Berg	288	8.5	−5.2
Conservative	Colin Mace	242	7.2	−4.4
Conservative	Robert Cantwell	238	7.0	−3.6
TUSC	Mike Cleverley	207	6.1	+3.9
TUSC	Louise Cuffaro	128	3.8	N/A
Turnout		3,376	36.8	
Labour hold				
Labour hold				
Labour hold				

Hoe Street
Party	Candidate	Votes	%	±%
Labour	Saima Mahmud	2,279	63.1	+24.0
Labour	Mark Rusling	2,226	61.6	+22.6
Labour	Ahsan Khan	2,209	61.1	+18.9
Green	Stephen Lambert	580	16.1	−2.8
Green	David Hamilton	527	14.6	−2.4
Green	Anne Warrington	513	14.2	−1.0
Conservative	Jonathan Canty	375	10.4	−2.7
Conservative	Roger Hemsted	333	9.2	−3.8
Conservative	Pamela Jovcic	331	9.2	−3.5
TUSC	Paul Bell	198	5.5	N/A
Liberal Democrats	Jahanara Azim	194	5.4	−23.3
Liberal Democrats	Peter Hatton	192	5.3	−21.2
Liberal Democrats	Zeliha Yilmaz	165	4.6	−12.4
Turnout		3,613	37.9	
Labour hold				
Labour hold				
Labour hold				

Larkswood
Party	Candidate	Votes	%	±%
Conservative	John Moss	1,428	45.2	−8.7
Conservative	Bernadette Mill	1,421	45.0	−7.8
Conservative	Millie Balkan	1,401	44.3	−4.1
Labour	Anne Garrett	956	30.3	+2.6
Labour	Noel Hayes	916	29.0	+5.3
Labour	Henrietta Jackson	859	27.2	+4.9
UKIP	Richard King	780	24.7	N/A
Liberal Democrats	Jenny Sullivan	169	5.3	−12.0
Liberal	Bob Carey	154	4.9	N/A
TUSC	Ian Pattison	142	4.5	N/A
Turnout		3,160	36.5	
Conservative hold				
Conservative hold				
Conservative hold				

Lea Bridge
Party	Candidate	Votes	%	±%
Labour	Masood Ahmad	2,259	68.0	+15.0
Labour	Mohammad Asghar	2,020	60.8	+8.6
Labour	Yemi Osho	1,871	56.3	+6.3
Green	Rachel Barrat	619	18.6	+5.6
Liberal Democrats	Katy Andrews	429	12.9	−20.3
Conservative	Jenny Cantwell	379	11.4	−0.7
Liberal Democrats	Azhar Kayani	375	11.3	−15.0
Conservative	Christopher Berg	370	11.1	N/A
Conservative	Carsten Lobo	289	8.7	N/A
TUSC	Martin Reynolds	276	8.3	N/A
Liberal Democrats	Marcin Nocek	233	7.0	−4.3
Turnout		3,323	31.2	
Labour hold				
Labour hold				
Labour hold				

Leyton
Party	Candidate	Votes	%	±%
Labour	Jacob Edwards	1,973	54.9	+14.2
Labour	Whitney Ihenachor	1,923	53.5	+13.7
Labour	Simon Miller	1,786	49.7	+9.6
Liberal Democrats	Bob Sullivan	1,211	33.7	−9.0
Liberal Democrats	Audrey Lee	1,044	29.0	−15.6
Liberal Democrats	Jerome Harvey-Agyei	1,022	28.4	−14.5
Green	Diana Wellings	381	10.6	−2.0
Conservative	James Edwards	233	6.5	−2.6
Conservative	Anne Pryor	209	5.8	−3.1
Conservative	Nicholas Hyett	205	5.7	+3.2
TUSC	Suzanne Beishon	157	4.4	N/A
TUSC	Kevin Parslow	130	3.6	N/A
Turnout		3,597	36.7	
Labour gain from Liberal Democrats				
Labour gain from Liberal Democrats				
Labour gain from Liberal Democrats				

Leytonstone
Party	Candidate	Votes	%	±%
Labour	Clyde Loakes	1,979	55.9	+11.0
Labour	Marie Pye	1,947	55.0	+11.1
Labour	Jenny Gray	1,905	53.8	+8.1
Green	Mark Dawes	700	19.8	+6.0
Liberal Democrats	Suleman Ahmed	652	18.4	−11.3
Liberal Democrats	Faiz Faiz	598	16.9	−11.9
Liberal Democrats	Sadia Mirza	566	16.0	−11.9
Conservative	Helen Johnson	473	13.4	−3.5
Conservative	David Alt	427	12.1	−4.4
Conservative	Molly Leport	379	10.7	−3.1
TUSC	Suzanne Muna	190	5.4	N/A
TUSC	Len Hockey	180	5.1	N/A
TUSC	Aidan Taylor	129	3.6	N/A
Turnout		3,541	38.8	
Labour hold				
Labour hold				
Labour hold				

Markhouse
Party	Candidate	Votes	%	±%
Labour	Sharon Waldron	2,011	63.2	+17.3
Labour	Asim Mahmood	1,952	61.3	+15.8
Labour	Johar Khan	1,930	60.6	+18.7
Green	Claire Norman	772	24.3	+11.2
Conservative	Stephen Murphy	439	13.8	+0.6
Liberal Democrats	Matt Lake	398	12.5	−22.3
TUSC	Dan Gillman	362	11.4	N/A
Liberal Democrats	Quintin Rubin	290	9.1	−21.0
TUSC	Joel Hirsch	268	8.4	N/A
Liberal Democrats	Nund Lofur	187	5.9	−16.8
Turnout		3,183	34.2	
Labour hold				
Labour hold				
Labour hold				

Valley
Party	Candidate	Votes	%	±%
Conservative	Jemma Hemsted	1,388	42.5	−7.8
Conservative	Alan Sigger	1,318	40.4	−9.0
Labour	Aktar Beg	1,160	35.6	+18.4
Conservative	Laurance Wedderburn	1,100	33.7	−14.4
Labour	Jonathan O'Dea	1,063	32.6	+16.3
Labour	Shumon Rahman	1,033	31.7	+15.5
UKIP	John Murray	793	24.3	N/A
Liberal Democrats	Ian Paterson	211	6.5	−26.1
Liberal Democrats	Shahnaz Malik	205	6.3	−25.7
Liberal	Henry Boyle	179	5.5	−11.7
TUSC	Sarah Wrack	164	5.0	N/A
Turnout		3,263	37.8	
Conservative hold				
Conservative hold				
Labour gain from Conservative				

William Morris
Party	Candidate	Votes	%	±%
Labour	Grace Williams	2,441	64.0	+17.3
Labour	Nadeem Ali	2,421	63.5	+18.3
Labour	Stuart Emmerson	2,287	60.0	+16.4
Green	Huw Davies	724	19.0	+5.5
UKIP	Ummer Farooq	333	8.7	N/A
Liberal Democrats	Jamie Cook	317	8.3	−24.2
Conservative	Gilliam Hemsted	290	7.6	−3.7
Conservative	Sheila Vero	256	6.7	−4.5
Conservative	Mladen Jovcic	233	6.1	−3.5
Liberal Democrats	Qaisar Iqbal	222	5.8	−23.4
TUSC	Paula Mitchell	185	4.9	+0.6
Liberal Democrats	Muhammad Irfan Kayani	176	4.6	−23.6
TUSC	Kenneth Douglas	149	3.9	N/A
TUSC	Michael McClinton	142	3.7	N/A
Turnout		3,812	41.5	
Labour hold				
Labour hold				
Labour hold				

Wood Street
Party	Candidate	Votes	%	±%
Labour	Angie Bean	2,267	58.8	+8.8
Labour	Peter Barnett	2,120	55.0	+7.4
Labour	Richard Sweden	1,999	51.8	+10.0
Conservative	Ismet Balkan	825	21.4	+1.3
Conservative	Abdul Alavi	818	21.2	+2.8
Conservative	Riitta Soininen	693	18.0	±0.0
Green	Roger Payne	626	16.2	+5.7
UKIP	Bob Cox	402	10.4	N/A
Liberal Democrats	Naila Mahmood	201	5.2	−21.9
TUSC	Lee Hawksbee	190	4.9	N/A
TUSC	Stephen Poole	188	4.9	N/A
Liberal Democrats	Maqsood Hussain	173	4.5	−18.2
Liberal Democrats	Sahar Masih	135	3.5	−16.9
Turnout		3,858	40.8	
Labour hold				
Labour hold				
Labour hold				
