= Miranda Grell =

British barrister and Labour councillor (born 1978)

- Born: Miranda Agnes Jayne Grell; June 1978 (age 48); Camborne, Cornwall, England
- Education: University of Manchester
- Known for: Making false statements about political opponent in breach of electoral law
- Title: Councillor for the London Borough of Waltham Forest.
- Term: May 2006 – November 2007
- Predecessor: Barry Smith
- Successor: Winnie Smith
- Political party: Labour Party (resigned)
- Criminal charge: Making a false statement of fact about a candidate's personal character or conduct for electoral advantage
- Criminal penalty: Barred from holding public office for 3 years
- Website: www.mirandagrell.com

Miranda Agnes Jayne Grell (born June 1978) is a barrister and former Labour Party councillor for the London Borough of Waltham Forest. She was the first person to be found guilty of making false statements under the Representation of the People Act 1983, having made false allegations of paedophilia against her political opponent, Barry Smith, during an election campaign. Grell was banned for holding public office for three years as a result.

She subsequently trained to become a barrister and was called to the Bar in 2014.

== Early life ==
Grell was born in 1978 to parents from Dominica who had moved to Britain in 1973. She says she had no relationship with her father. She attended Walthamstow School for Girls, studied European studies with modern languages at the University of Manchester, gaining a first class honours degree, and took a master's degree in industrial relations from the London School of Economics.

== Politics ==
Grell joined the Labour Party in 1999 having been persuaded to do so by her friend and fellow student Chuka Umunna, who became an MP in 2010.

At the time she stood in the Waltham Forest local election, she worked as a senior policy adviser to the conciliation service Acas. She had previously worked as a trainee speech writer for Anna Diamantopoulou. Following her election to the council, she went to work as a researcher for the then deputy mayor of London, Nicky Gavron. She served on the management committee of the pressure group Compass from June 2005 until her resignation from the committee on 30 November 2007. Grell was also a school governor.

== 2006 local election controversy ==
Grell was elected in the May 2006 local elections for the Leyton ward of Waltham Forest London Borough Council. The ward returned three councillors, two Liberal Democrats and one Labour, Grell, in the third position. In 2002, Leyton had returned three Liberal Democrats. Grell gained the seat when the Liberal Democrats made gains in the borough. However, in September 2007, she went on trial on charges under the Representation of the People Act 1983 of making a false statement of fact about a candidate's personal character or conduct for electoral advantage, specifically that she made allegations of paedophilia against her gay Liberal Democrat opponent, Barry Smith. In addition to losing his seat Smith stated he was verbally abused in the street, spat at, and forced to relocate to the north of England as a result of the false allegations, fearing for his life.

Grell admitted to outing her opponent and falsely claiming he had a 19-year-old Thai boyfriend (Smith's partner was actually 39 and Malaysian), though she denied making the false allegations of paedophilia to four residents. Witnesses against Grell included a Labour voter and also another Labour candidate for her ward, Nicholas Russell. On 21 September 2007, she was found guilty on two counts, fined £1,000 and ordered to pay £3,000 towards the prosecution costs.

On 24 October 2007, Grell's supporters launched a campaign to finance her appeal, but it was later reported that the Labour Party would pay her legal costs. Labour then withdrew this support. On 27 November, The Independent newspaper quoted a party spokesman: "Following legal advice in the last few days, the Labour Party today withdrew its support for Miranda Grell's appeal." Criticism was levelled at the party for supporting Grell's appeal, in particular by gay rights campaigner and former Labour candidate Peter Tatchell.

Grell's appeal hearing began on 28 November 2007 at Snaresbrook Crown Court before Judge Peter Birts QC and two lay magistrates. On 30 November, Grell's conviction for making false statements about another candidate to gain electoral advantage was upheld. She vacated her seat and was banned from holding public office for three years. The by-election for Leyton ward on 14 February 2008 was won by Liberal Democrat Winnie Smith.

Following the appeal verdict, Grell resigned from the Labour Party, from her job working for the deputy mayor of London, and from the management committee of the Compass pressure group, but still claimed innocence, continuing to do so years afterwards. Grell lodged a first application with the Criminal Cases Review Commission in 2009, assisted by Lord Gifford QC.

== Subsequent career ==
In 2011 she became the interim development officer, then business development manager, of the Hackney Community Law Centre. She was the 2014 recipient of the Reita Clarke Memorial Award for outstanding achievement, awarded by the Law Centres Network.

In November 2014, after completing the Bar Professional Training Course (BPTC) at the City University Law School in Gray's Inn London, Grell was called to the Bar of England and Wales by the Inner Temple. She was proposed by former Lord Justice of Appeal Sir Stephen Sedley.

She was actively involved in the Britain Stronger in Europe campaign in Leyton and Wanstead and nationally, appearing in official campaign videos.

She appeared as an audience member on the EU Referendum: The Great Debate television programme broadcast on BBC One on 21 June 2016.

== See also ==
- Phil Woolas (Labour MP later disqualified under same law)
