= 2010 Waltham Forest London Borough Council election =

- 6 May 2010

All 60 seats to Waltham Forest London Borough Council 31 seats needed for a majority
| | First party | Second party | Third party |
|---|---|---|---|
| Leader | Chris Robbins | Matt Davis | John Macklin |
| Party | Labour | Conservative | Liberal Democrats |
| Leader's seat | Grove Green | Endlebury | Chapel End (retiring) |
| Last election | 26 seats | 15 seats | 19 seats |
| Seats won | 36 | 18 | 6 |
| Seat change | ▲9 | ▲3 | ▼14 |
| Percentage | 38.9% | 24.9% | 30.1% |
- Map of the results of the 2010 Waltham Forest council election. Conservatives in blue, Labour in red and Liberal Democrats in yellow.
Council control before election
No overall control
Council control after election
Labour

The 2010 Council elections for London Borough of Waltham Forest were held on 6 May 2010. The 2010 General Election and other local elections also took place on the same day.

In London council elections, the entire council is elected every four years, opposed to some local elections where one councillor is elected every year for three of the four years.

After eight years of the council being in no overall control, although governed by Labour, firstly in a minority and latterly in coalition with the Liberal Democrats, Labour regained their overall majority on the council.

== Eligibility ==
All locally registered electors (British, Irish, Commonwealth and European Union citizens) who were aged 18 or over on Thursday, 6 May 2010, were entitled to vote in the local elections. Those who were temporarily away from their ordinary address (for example, away working, on holiday, in student accommodation or in hospital) were also entitled to vote in the local elections, although those who had moved abroad and registered as overseas electors cannot vote in the local elections. It is possible to register to vote at more than one address (such as a university student who had a term-time address and lives at home during holidays) at the discretion of the local Electoral Register Office, but it remains an offence to vote more than once in the same local government election.

== Composition before election ==
| Elected in 2006 | | Before election | |
| Party | Seats | Party | Seats |
|---|---|---|---|
| Labour | 26 | Labour | 25 |
| Liberal Democrats | 19 | Liberal Democrats | 20 |
| Conservative | 15 | Conservative | 15 |

== Election result ==
Waltham Forest Council election result 2010
| Party | Seats | Gains | Losses | Net gain/loss | Seats % | Votes % | Votes | +/− |
|---|---|---|---|---|---|---|---|---|
| Labour | 36 | 9 | 0 | +9 | 60.0 | 38.9 | 109,998 | |
| Liberal Democrats | 6 | 0 | 14 | -14 | 10.0 | 30.1 | 85,036 | |
| Conservative | 18 | 3 | 0 | +3 | 30.0 | 24.9 | 70,400 | |
| Green | 0 | 0 | 0 | 0 | 0.0 | 4.3 | 12,133 | |
| Independent | 0 | 0 | 0 | 0 | 0.0 | 1.4 | 3,963 | |
| UKIP | 0 | 0 | 0 | 0 | 0.0 | 0.2 | 551 | |
| TUSC | 0 | 0 | 0 | 0 | 0.0 | 0.2 | 332 | |
| CPA | 0 | 0 | 0 | 0 | 0.0 | 0.1 | 278 | |

== Results by ward ==
The ward results listed below are based on the changes from the 2006 elections, not taking into account any mid-term by-elections or party defections.

Cann Hall
| Party | Candidate | Votes | % |
|---|---|---|---|
| Labour | Tunde Davies | 2,103 | 44.9 |
| Labour | Nicholas Russell | 1,986 | 42.4 |
| Liberal Democrats | Liz Phillips | 1,986 | 42.4 |
| Liberal Democrats | Keith Rayner | 1,829 | 39.1 |
| Labour | Faiz Yunis | 1,784 | 38.1 |
| Liberal Democrats | Adrian Trett | 1,493 | 31.9 |
| Conservative | Bill de Gouveia | 509 | 10.9 |
| Conservative | Letrois Bernard | 492 | 10.5 |
| Conservative | David Hemsted | 447 | 9.5 |
| Green | Pat Howie | 420 | 9.0 |
| Turnout | | 4,683 | 55.2 |
| Labour gain from Liberal Democrats | | | |
| Labour gain from Liberal Democrats | | | |
| Liberal Democrats hold | | | |

Cathall
| Party | Candidate | Votes | % |
|---|---|---|---|
| Labour | Naheed Asghar | 2,087 | 49.9 |
| Labour | Shameem Highfield | 1,885 | 45.1 |
| Labour | Terry Wheeler | 1,848 | 44.2 |
| Liberal Democrats | Joe Dyer | 1,439 | 34.3 |
| Liberal Democrats | Milton Martin | 1,435 | 34.3 |
| Liberal Democrats | Shahid Majid | 1,316 | 31.5 |
| Conservative | Anne Pryor | 466 | 11.1 |
| Conservative | Derek Pryor | 404 | 9.7 |
| Conservative | Jean Savage | 377 | 9.0 |
| Green | Anne Warrington | 320 | 7.6 |
| Turnout | | 4,184 | 51.1 |
| Labour hold | | | |
| Labour hold | | | |
| Labour hold | | | |

Chapel End
| Party | Candidate | Votes | % |
|---|---|---|---|
| Labour | Paul Douglas | 2,180 | 40.2 |
| Labour | Kieran Falconer | 1,995 | 36.8 |
| Labour | Abu Samih | 1,823 | 33.6 |
| Liberal Democrats | Matt Lake | 1,343 | 24.7 |
| Liberal Democrats | Saeed Diwan | 1,294 | 23.8 |
| Liberal Democrats | Andrew Morrell | 1,229 | 22.6 |
| Conservative | Millie Balkan | 904 | 16.7 |
| Independent | Bob Belam | 844 | 15.5 |
| Conservative | Owen Evans | 820 | 15.1 |
| Conservative | Anne Hexter | 772 | 14.2 |
| Independent | Bob Carey | 667 | 12.3 |
| Independent | John Macklin | 569 | 10.5 |
| Green | Susan Wheat | 536 | 9.9 |
| UKIP | Bob Brock | 296 | 5.5 |
| Turnout | | 5,428 | 60.1 |
| Labour gain from Liberal Democrats | | | |
| Labour gain from Liberal Democrats | | | |
| Labour gain from Liberal Democrats | | | |

Chingford Green
| Party | Candidate | Votes | % |
|---|---|---|---|
| Conservative | Thom Goddard | 3,152 | 58.6 |
| Conservative | Michael Lewis | 3,112 | 57.9 |
| Conservative | Andrew Hemsted | 3,083 | 57.4 |
| Liberal Democrats | Joan Carder | 985 | 18.3 |
| Labour | Noel Hayes | 964 | 17.9 |
| Liberal Democrats | Ian Paterson | 964 | 17.9 |
| Liberal Democrats | Keith Wenden | 932 | 17.3 |
| Labour | Elizabeth Lee | 917 | 17.1 |
| Labour | Frances Manjra | 760 | 14.1 |
| Turnout | | 5,375 | 67.7 |
| Conservative hold | | | |
| Conservative hold | | | |
| Conservative hold | | | |

Endlebury
| Party | Candidate | Votes | % |
|---|---|---|---|
| Conservative | Roy Berg | 3,002 | 54.7 |
| Conservative | Peter Herrington | 2,741 | 50.0 |
| Conservative | Matthew Davis | 2,686 | 49.0 |
| Labour | William Bayliss | 976 | 17.8 |
| Independent | Trevor Calver | 869 | 15.8 |
| Labour | Kenneth Kennedy | 861 | 15.7 |
| Labour | Sheila Dore | 859 | 15.7 |
| Liberal Democrats | Violet Wells | 679 | 12.4 |
| Liberal Democrats | Kathleen Mudie | 665 | 12.1 |
| Liberal Democrats | Edward Carder | 644 | 11.7 |
| Green | Joan Allen | 461 | 8.4 |
| Independent | Dawn Bishop | 234 | 4.3 |
| Turnout | | 5,487 | 67.3 |
| Conservative hold | | | |
| Conservative hold | | | |
| Conservative hold | | | |

Forest
| Party | Candidate | Votes | % |
|---|---|---|---|
| Labour | Gerry Lyons | 2,070 | 41.6 |
| Liberal Democrats | Farooq Qureshi | 1,914 | 38.4 |
| Labour | Shabana Qadir | 1,875 | 37.7 |
| Labour | Mumtaz Zafar | 1,710 | 34.3 |
| Liberal Democrats | Samina Safdar | 1,497 | 30.1 |
| Liberal Democrats | Haroon Munir | 1,436 | 28.8 |
| Conservative | Julien Foster | 755 | 15.2 |
| Conservative | David Bromiley | 674 | 13.5 |
| Green | Rosalind Bedlow | 658 | 13.2 |
| Conservative | Gulsum Aytac | 565 | 11.3 |
| Independent | Martin Duncan-Jones | 298 | 6.0 |
| CPA | Jean Farmer | 278 | 5.6 |
| Turnout | | 4,979 | 59.0 |
| Labour hold | | | |
| Liberal Democrats hold | | | |
| Labour gain from Liberal Democrats | | | |

Grove Green
| Party | Candidate | Votes | % |
|---|---|---|---|
| Labour | Chris Robbins | 2,342 | 46.1 |
| Labour | Anna Mbachu | 2,271 | 44.7 |
| Labour | Khevyn Limbajee | 2,178 | 42.9 |
| Liberal Democrats | Neal Chubb | 1,681 | 33.1 |
| Liberal Democrats | Abbas Yousaf | 1,639 | 32.3 |
| Liberal Democrats | Paul Olford | 1,563 | 30.8 |
| Conservative | Pervaiz Khan | 608 | 12.0 |
| Conservative | Michelle Sweetman | 599 | 11.8 |
| Conservative | Ben Smith | 594 | 11.7 |
| Green | Bill Measure | 429 | 8.4 |
| Green | Maureen Measure | 383 | 7.5 |
| Turnout | | 5,080 | 54.4 |
| Labour hold | | | |
| Labour hold | | | |
| Labour hold | | | |

Hale End and Highams Park
| Party | Candidate | Votes | % |
|---|---|---|---|
| Conservative | Sheree Rackham | 2,064 | 37.7 |
| Conservative | Paul Braham | 2,026 | 37.1 |
| Conservative | Darshan Singh Sunger | 1,904 | 34.8 |
| Liberal Democrats | Sheila Smith-Pryor | 1,825 | 33.4 |
| Liberal Democrats | Nick Bason | 1,814 | 33.2 |
| Liberal Democrats | Jane Morgan | 1,796 | 32.8 |
| Labour | Martin Dore | 1,401 | 25.6 |
| Labour | Richard James | 1,287 | 23.5 |
| Labour | Neil Weekes | 1,225 | 22.4 |
| Turnout | | 5,468 | 67.2 |
| Conservative gain from Liberal Democrats | | | |
| Conservative gain from Liberal Democrats | | | |
| Conservative gain from Liberal Democrats | | | |

Hatch Lane
| Party | Candidate | Votes | % |
|---|---|---|---|
| Conservative | Marion Fitzgerald | 2,743 | 52.5 |
| Conservative | Laurie Braham | 2,500 | 47.9 |
| Conservative | Geoffrey Walker | 2,481 | 47.5 |
| Labour | David Blunt | 1,312 | 25.1 |
| Liberal Democrats | Marc Jones | 1,115 | 21.4 |
| Liberal Democrats | Jeremy Dauncey | 1,055 | 20.2 |
| Labour | Ali Murtaza | 977 | 18.7 |
| Labour | Shaheen Rafique | 934 | 17.9 |
| Liberal Democrats | Clyde Kitson | 819 | 15.7 |
| Green | Robert Tatam | 569 | 10.9 |
| Turnout | | 5,220 | 62.9 |
| Conservative hold | | | |
| Conservative hold | | | |
| Conservative hold | | | |

High Street
| Party | Candidate | Votes | % |
|---|---|---|---|
| Labour | Liaquat Ali | 2,325 | 41.9 |
| Labour | Clare Coghill | 2,180 | 39.3 |
| Liberal Democrats | Mahmood Hussain | 2,045 | 36.8 |
| Labour | Steve Terry | 1,932 | 34.8 |
| Liberal Democrats | Johar Khan | 1,923 | 34.6 |
| Liberal Democrats | James O'Rourke | 1,712 | 30.8 |
| Green | Anna Lindstrom | 774 | 13.9 |
| Conservative | Shaun Hexter | 507 | 9.1 |
| Conservative | Rachel Wedderburn | 506 | 9.1 |
| Conservative | Mike Vero | 488 | 8.8 |
| Green | Kuan Phillips | 478 | 8.6 |
| Independent | Aurangzaib Sharif | 157 | 2.8 |
| Independent | Michael Gold | 110 | 2.0 |
| Turnout | | 5,550 | 58.7 |
| Labour hold | | | |
| Labour gain from Liberal Democrats | | | |
| Liberal Democrats hold | | | |

Higham Hill
| Party | Candidate | Votes | % |
|---|---|---|---|
| Labour | Karen Bellamy | 2,124 | 44.9 |
| Labour | Geoff Hammond | 1,914 | 40.4 |
| Labour | Haroon Khan | 1,849 | 39.1 |
| Liberal Democrats | Sean Meiszner | 1,810 | 38.3 |
| Liberal Democrats | Peter Woollcott | 1,677 | 35.4 |
| Liberal Democrats | Patrick Smith | 1,647 | 34.8 |
| Conservative | Kathy Berg | 648 | 13.7 |
| Conservative | Pamela Jovcic | 550 | 11.6 |
| Conservative | Sheila Vero | 503 | 10.6 |
| Green | Oliver Parsons | 377 | 8.0 |
| UKIP | Judith Chisholm | 255 | 5.4 |
| TUSC | Uthayasenan Thanabala Singam | 104 | 2.2 |
| Turnout | | 4,732 | 56.5 |
| Labour gain from Liberal Democrats | | | |
| Labour gain from Liberal Democrats | | | |
| Labour gain from Liberal Democrats | | | |

Hoe Street
| Party | Candidate | Votes | % |
|---|---|---|---|
| Labour | Ahsan Khan | 2,265 | 42.2 |
| Labour | Saima Mahmud | 2,098 | 39.1 |
| Labour | Mark Rusling | 2,096 | 39.0 |
| Liberal Democrats | Farooq Arif | 1,542 | 28.7 |
| Liberal Democrats | Najm Anwar | 1,425 | 26.5 |
| Green | Stephen Lambert | 1,015 | 18.9 |
| Green | Elen Miles | 915 | 17.0 |
| Liberal Democrats | Naseem Saleemi | 913 | 17.0 |
| Green | Daniel Perrett | 816 | 15.2 |
| Conservative | Dominic Gover | 701 | 13.1 |
| Conservative | Roger Hemsted | 699 | 13.0 |
| Conservative | Susan Herrington | 681 | 12.7 |
| Turnout | | 5,368 | 58.9 |
| Labour hold | | | |
| Labour hold | | | |
| Labour hold | | | |

Larkswood
| Party | Candidate | Votes | % |
|---|---|---|---|
| Conservative | Nicholas Buckmaster | 2,777 | 53.9 |
| Conservative | Bernadette Mill | 2,720 | 52.8 |
| Conservative | Edwin Northover | 2,498 | 48.4 |
| Labour | Anne Garrett | 1,427 | 27.7 |
| Labour | Sivakumar Chelliah | 1,224 | 23.7 |
| Labour | Johanna Rashid | 1,148 | 22.3 |
| Liberal Democrats | Graham Woolnough | 891 | 17.3 |
| Liberal Democrats | Gerry McGarry | 817 | 15.8 |
| Liberal Democrats | Khalid Sharif | 668 | 13.0 |
| Turnout | | 5,156 | 61.8 |
| Conservative hold | | | |
| Conservative hold | | | |
| Conservative hold | | | |

Lea Bridge
| Party | Candidate | Votes | % |
|---|---|---|---|
| Labour | Masood Ahmad | 2,891 | 53.0 |
| Labour | Afzal Akram | 2,850 | 52.2 |
| Labour | Elisabeth Davies | 2,730 | 50.0 |
| Liberal Democrats | Katy Andrews | 1,810 | 33.2 |
| Liberal Democrats | Eren Aslan | 1,435 | 26.3 |
| Green | David Hamilton | 711 | 13.0 |
| Conservative | Abdul Mahroof | 661 | 12.1 |
| Liberal Democrats | Yousaff Khan | 618 | 11.3 |
| Independent | Mian Zahid | 215 | 3.9 |
| Turnout | | 5,459 | 53.1 |
| Labour hold | | | |
| Labour hold | | | |
| Labour hold | | | |

Leyton
| Party | Candidate | Votes | % |
|---|---|---|---|
| Liberal Democrats | Naheed Qureshi | 2,190 | 44.6 |
| Liberal Democrats | Winnie Smith | 2,104 | 42.9 |
| Liberal Democrats | Bob Sullivan | 2,095 | 42.7 |
| Labour | Patrick Edwards | 1,996 | 40.7 |
| Labour | Simon Miller | 1,967 | 40.1 |
| Labour | Matthew Garness | 1,954 | 39.8 |
| Green | Diana Wellings | 618 | 12.6 |
| Conservative | Christopher Nott | 446 | 9.1 |
| Conservative | Mollie Neilson-Hansen | 436 | 8.9 |
| Conservative | Carol Chatfield | 123 | 2.5 |
| Turnout | | 4,907 | 54.6 |
| Liberal Democrats hold | | | |
| Liberal Democrats hold | | | |
| Liberal Democrats gain from Labour | | | |

Leytonstone
| Party | Candidate | Votes | % |
|---|---|---|---|
| Labour | Jenny Gray | 2,338 | 45.7 |
| Labour | Clyde Loakes | 2,298 | 44.9 |
| Labour | Marie Pye | 2,246 | 43.9 |
| Liberal Democrats | Anthony Ashworth | 1,519 | 29.7 |
| Liberal Democrats | Faiz Faiz | 1,473 | 28.8 |
| Liberal Democrats | John Howard | 1,428 | 27.9 |
| Conservative | David Atherton | 867 | 16.9 |
| Conservative | Helen Johnson | 844 | 16.5 |
| Green | Mark Dawes | 708 | 13.8 |
| Conservative | John Moss | 704 | 13.8 |
| Turnout | | 5,119 | 58.4 |
| Labour hold | | | |
| Labour hold | | | |
| Labour hold | | | |

Markhouse
| Party | Candidate | Votes | % |
|---|---|---|---|
| Labour | Mohammad Asghar | 2,309 | 45.9 |
| Labour | Asim Mahmood | 2,286 | 45.5 |
| Labour | Ebony Vincent | 2,108 | 41.9 |
| Liberal Democrats | Javed Azam | 1,749 | 34.8 |
| Liberal Democrats | Doreen Ingleton | 1,515 | 30.1 |
| Liberal Democrats | Osman Saleemi | 1,143 | 22.7 |
| Conservative | Zahood Ahmed | 665 | 13.2 |
| Green | Maria Paterlini-Phillips | 658 | 13.1 |
| Conservative | Michael Bamber | 607 | 12.1 |
| Conservative | Ayhan Kizil | 446 | 8.9 |
| Turnout | | 5,028 | 56.7 |
| Labour hold | | | |
| Labour hold | | | |
| Labour hold | | | |

Valley
| Party | Candidate | Votes | % |
|---|---|---|---|
| Conservative | Jemma Hemsted | 2,060 | 50.3 |
| Conservative | Alan Siggers | 2,020 | 49.4 |
| Conservative | Laurance Wedderburn | 1,967 | 48.1 |
| Liberal Democrats | Grace Chambers | 1,334 | 32.6 |
| Liberal Democrats | Aktar Beg | 1,309 | 32.0 |
| Liberal Democrats | Peter Woodrow | 1,265 | 30.9 |
| Labour | Henry Boyle | 703 | 17.2 |
| Labour | Afzal Malik | 669 | 16.3 |
| Labour | Cynthia Wenden | 662 | 16.2 |
| Turnout | | 4,092 | 61.9 |
| Conservative hold | | | |
| Conservative hold | | | |
| Conservative hold | | | |

William Morris
| Party | Candidate | Votes | % |
|---|---|---|---|
| Labour | Geraldine Reardon | 2,467 | 46.7 |
| Labour | Nadeem Ali | 2,387 | 45.2 |
| Labour | Raja Anwar | 2,300 | 43.6 |
| Liberal Democrats | Bob Wheatley | 1,714 | 32.5 |
| Liberal Democrats | Tulat Raja | 1,543 | 29.2 |
| Liberal Democrats | Samantha Syrus | 1,487 | 28.2 |
| Green | Alison Walker | 713 | 13.5 |
| Conservative | Shane Clapham | 596 | 11.3 |
| Conservative | David Mears | 592 | 11.2 |
| Conservative | Mladen Jovcic | 508 | 9.6 |
| TUSC | Susan Wills | 228 | 4.3 |
| Turnout | | 5,281 | 60.5 |
| Labour hold | | | |
| Labour hold | | | |
| Labour gain from Liberal Democrats | | | |

Wood Street
| Party | Candidate | Votes | % |
|---|---|---|---|
| Labour | Angie Bean | 2,740 | 50.0 |
| Labour | Peter Barnett | 2,612 | 47.6 |
| Labour | Richard Sweden | 2,293 | 41.8 |
| Liberal Democrats | Andrew Hudson | 1,488 | 27.1 |
| Liberal Democrats | Azhar Kayani | 1,244 | 22.7 |
| Liberal Democrats | Dil Pazeer | 1,116 | 20.4 |
| Conservative | Elliott Burton | 1,103 | 20.1 |
| Conservative | Tim James | 1,010 | 18.4 |
| Conservative | Sandeep Christian | 987 | 18.0 |
| Green | Christine Olende | 574 | 10.5 |
| Turnout | | 5,482 | 61.5 |
| Labour hold | | | |
| Labour hold | | | |
| Labour hold | | | |
