= 2018 Waltham Forest London Borough Council election =

2018 local election in England

- 3 May 2018

All 60 council seats 31 seats needed for a majority
	First party	Second party
Party	Labour	Conservative
Last election	44 seats, 52.9%	16 seats, 20.7%
Seats won	46	14
Seat change	▲2	▼2
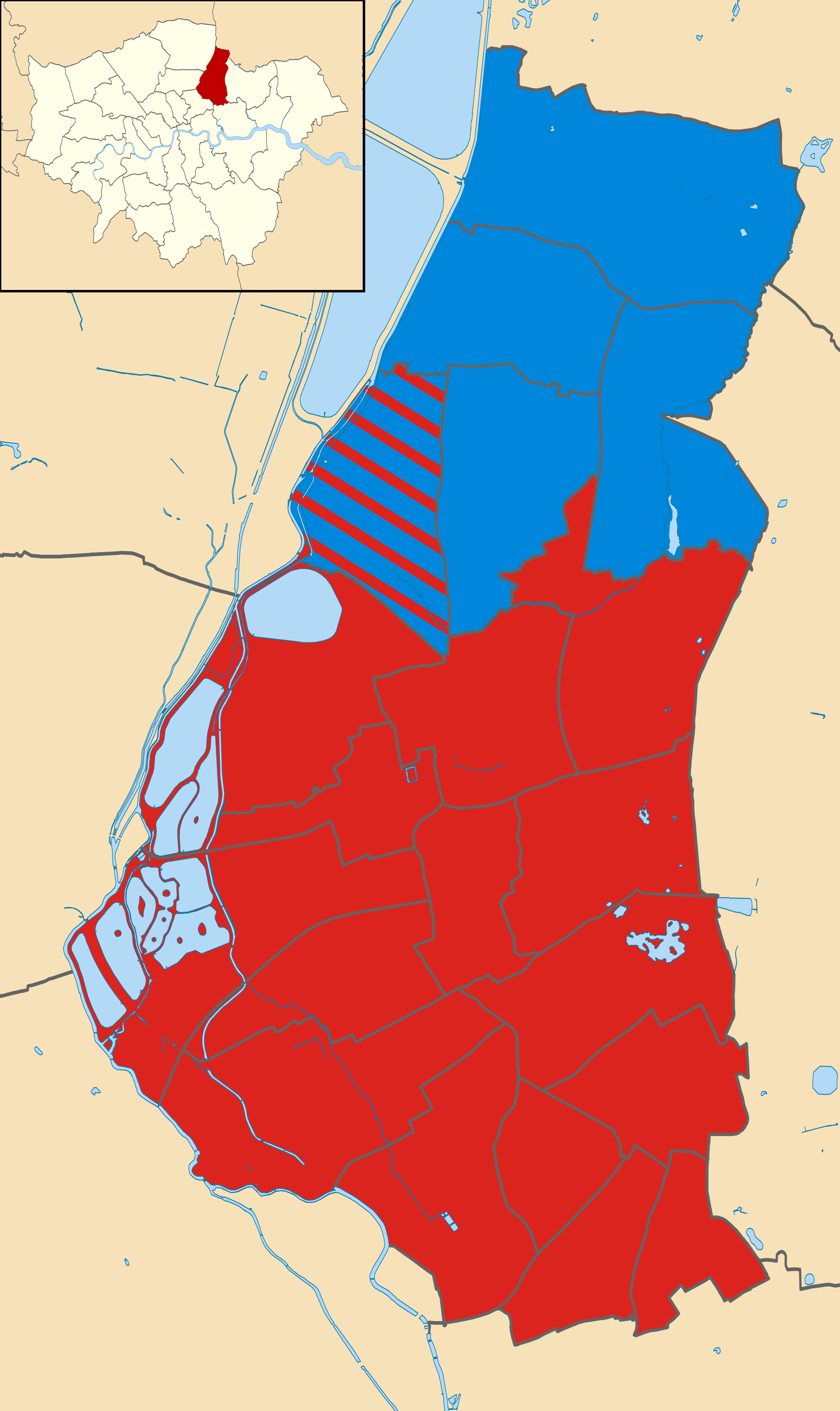
- Map of the results of the 2018 Waltham Forest council election. Conservatives in blue and Labour in red.
Council control before election
Labour
Council control after election
Labour

The 2018 Waltham Forest Council election was held on 3 May 2018 to elect members of Waltham Forest London Borough Council in England. This was on the same day as other local elections.

== Election result ==
Waltham Forest Council election result 2018
Party	Seats	Gains	Losses	Net gain/loss	Seats %	Votes %	Votes	+/−
Labour	46	2	0	+2	76.7	58.1	115,189	+5.2
Conservative	14	0	2	-2	23.3	24.1	47,708	+3.4
Liberal Democrats	0	0	0	0	0.0	10.3	20,453	-3.2
Green	0	0	0	0	0.0	5.5	10,963	-0.1
TUSC	0	0	0	0	0.0	1.4	2,836	-1.5
Duma Polska	0	0	0	0	0.0	0.2	349	New
London Independent Network	0	0	0	0	0.0	0.1	259	New
Liberal	0	0	0	0	0.0	0.1	117	-0.2
Independent	0	0	0	0	0.0	0.2	385	-0.1

== Results by ward ==
=== Cann Hall ===
Cann Hall (3)
Party	Candidate	Votes	%	±%
Labour	Sally Littlejohn	1,993	64.6	+12.6
Labour	Keith Rayner	1,971	63.9	+7.5
Labour	Patrick Edwards	1,958	63.5	+10.2
Liberal Democrats	Liz Phillips	726	23.5	−7.7
Liberal Democrats	Rupert Alexander	682	22.1	−4.4
Liberal Democrats	Faiz Faiz	574	18.6	−5.4
Green	Ami Amlani	434	14.1	+1.4
Conservative	Kathleen Berg	178	5.8	−2.6
Conservative	Philip Brimley	167	5.4	−1.8
Conservative	Muhammed Shaikh	167	5.4	−0.8
TUSC	Claire Laker-Mansfield	67	2.2	−2.0
Turnout			33.89	
Majority		1,276		
Labour hold		Swing		
Labour hold		Swing		
Labour hold		Swing		

=== Cathall ===
Cathall (3)
Party	Candidate	Votes	%	±%
Labour Co-op	Naheed Asghar	1,996	77.6	+7.1
Labour Co-op	Terry Wheeler	1,887	73.4	+5.6
Labour Co-op	Jonathan O'Dea	1,863	72.4	+7.1
Green	Glyn Roberts	320	12.4	−0.3
Liberal Democrats	John Howard	231	9.0	+1.5
Conservative	Fatima Ahmad	219	8.5	+1.0
Liberal Democrats	Joan O'Brien	205	8.0	+1.8
Liberal Democrats	Clyde Kitson	194	7.5	+0.5
Conservative	Craig Moss	194	7.5	+0.7
Conservative	Zarif Isa	153	5.9	−0.5
TUSC	Scott Jones	76	3.0	−0.5
Duma Polska	Elzbieta Raza	50	1.9	N/A
Turnout			31.94	
Majority		1,543		
Labour hold		Swing		
Labour hold		Swing		
Labour hold		Swing		

=== Chapel End ===
Chapel End (3)
Party	Candidate	Votes	%	±%
Labour Co-op	Louise Mitchell	2,272	67.6	+12.5
Labour Co-op	Paul Douglas	2,187	65.1	+10.7
Labour Co-op	Steve Terry	1,986	59.1	+10.7
Green	Susan Wheat	712	21.2	+3.4
Conservative	James Simmons	495	14.7	+0.3
Conservative	Fatlum Lushi	459	13.7	+1.1
Liberal Democrats	Rachelle Harris	430	12.8	−6.7
Conservative	Mostakin Miah	429	12.8	N/A
Liberal Democrats	Adam Pike	293	8.7	−7.7
Liberal Democrats	Peter Sigrist	279	8.3	−7.9
TUSC	Kevin Parslow	153	4.6	−1.2
Turnout			35.14	
Majority		1,274		
Labour Co-op hold		Swing		
Labour Co-op hold		Swing		
Labour Co-op hold		Swing		

=== Chingford Green ===
Chingford Green (3)
Party	Candidate	Votes	%	±%
Conservative	Andy Hemsted	2,185	61.3	+12.1
Conservative	Kay Isa	2,133	59.8	+9.5
Conservative	Nick Halebi	2,113	59.3	+14.6
Labour	Kieran Falconer	967	27.1	+5.9
Labour	Shameem Highfield	924	25.9	+6.9
Labour	Anton Lyons	860	24.1	+6.3
Green	Miranda James	474	13.3	N/A
Liberal Democrats	Joan Carder	270	7.6	−0.3
Liberal Democrats	Jennifer Sullivan	213	6.0	N/A
Turnout			43.58	
Majority		1,146		
Conservative hold		Swing		
Conservative hold		Swing		
Conservative hold		Swing		

=== Endlebury ===
Endlebury (3)
Party	Candidate	Votes	%	±%
Conservative	Roy Berg	2,276	65.0	+12.8
Conservative	Emma Best	2,223	63.5	+16.6
Conservative	Mitchell Goldie	2,166	61.9	+16.5
Labour	Arran Griffiths	929	26.5	+3.5
Labour	Crystal Ihenachor	890	25.4	+2.8
Labour	Shaheen Rafique	855	24.4	+5.8
Green	Rosemary Warrington	301	8.6	−3.2
Liberal Democrats	Christopher Portou	172	4.9	−2.0
Liberal Democrats	Bettina Szabo-Shaw	153	4.4	N/A
Turnout			41.37	
Majority		1,237		
Conservative hold		Swing		
Conservative hold		Swing		
Conservative hold		Swing		

=== Forest ===
Forest (3)
Party	Candidate	Votes	%	±%
Labour	Shabana Dhedhi	2,101	62.8	+14.8
Labour	Kastriot Berberi	2,013	60.2	+13.8
Labour	Gerry Lyons	1,936	57.9	+14.1
Liberal Democrats	Jordan Sullivan	770	23.0	−9.2
Liberal Democrats	Rupert Pickering	735	22.0	−6.3
Liberal Democrats	Dave Sherwood	698	20.9	−3.0
Green	Diana Korchien	548	16.4	+2.1
Conservative	Lauren Maske	281	8.4	±0.0
Conservative	Barbara Randall	278	8.3	+0.6
Conservative	Pamela Jovcic	258	7.7	+0.2
Turnout			38.38	
Majority		1,166		
Labour hold		Swing		
Labour hold		Swing		
Labour hold		Swing		

=== Grove Green ===
Grove Green (3)
Party	Candidate	Votes	%	±%
Labour Co-op	Anna Mbachu	2,052	59.2	+11.6
Labour Co-op	Khevyn Limbajee	2,047	59.0	+13.2
Labour Co-op	Chris Robbins	1,997	57.6	+7.1
Liberal Democrats	Arran Angus	897	25.9	−1.5
Liberal Democrats	Naomi McCarthy	725	20.9	−2.6
Liberal Democrats	Ukonu Obasi	623	18.0	−5.3
Green	Deanna Donovan	456	13.1	−0.7
Green	Liam Connor	416	12.0	−1.2
Conservative	Jane Bartram	247	7.1	−2.3
Conservative	James Ellingham	216	6.2	−2.9
Conservative	Thor Halland	200	5.8	−3.3
TUSC	Sarah Sachs-Eldridge	128	3.7	−0.6
Turnout			34.93	
Majority		1,100		
Labour Co-op hold		Swing		
Labour Co-op hold		Swing		
Labour Co-op hold		Swing		

=== Hale End & Highams Park ===
Hale End & Highams Park (3)
Party	Candidate	Votes	%	±%
Labour	Tony Bell	2,114	49.0	+11.2
Labour	Rosalind Doré	2,011	46.7	+12.6
Labour	Zia-Ur Rehham	1,846	42.8	+12.6
Conservative	Molly Samuel	1,794	41.6	+4.1
Conservative	Sheree Rackham	1,749	40.6	+2.1
Conservative	Munish Chopra-Evans	1,716	39.8	+4.8
Green	Roger Payne	597	13.9	+0.4
Liberal Democrats	Jane Morgan	319	7.4	−1.9
Liberal Democrats	Jo Loxton	274	6.4	−2.8
Turnout			48.78	
Majority		97		
Labour hold		Swing		
Labour gain from Conservative		Swing		
Labour gain from Conservative		Swing		

=== Hatch Lane ===
Hatch Lane (3)
Party	Candidate	Votes	%	±%
Conservative	Marion Fitzgerald	1,768	49.6	+2.7
Conservative	Geoff Walker	1,739	48.8	+9.4
Conservative	Tim James	1,709	48.0	+12.2
Labour Co-op	Lesley Finlayson	1,338	37.5	+8.0
Labour Co-op	Liz Fenton	1,309	36.7	+13.3
Labour Co-op	Jenny Lennox	1,287	36.1	+12.7
Green	Rosemary Green	367	10.3	−7.8
Green	Michael Holloway	279	7.8	N/A
Green	Rebecca Redwood	272	7.6	N/A
Liberal Democrats	Ted Cooke	231	6.5	−1.5
Turnout			41.84	
Majority		371		
Conservative hold		Swing		
Conservative hold		Swing		
Conservative hold		Swing		

=== High Street ===
High Street (3)
Party	Candidate	Votes	%	±%
Labour	Clare Coghill	2,629	68.9	+7.2
Labour	Raja Anwar	2,354	61.7	+7.8
Labour	Liaquat Ali	2,160	56.6	+5.1
Green	Andrew Johns	804	21.1	+3.7
Liberal Democrats	Ciara Simmons	374	9.8	−8.4
Liberal Democrats	Sally Burnell	361	9.5	−7.9
Liberal Democrats	Rory Fitzgerald	358	9.4	−5.8
Conservative	Richard Keough	303	7.9	+0.2
TUSC	Nancy Taafe	297	7.8	+1.9
Conservative	Henryka Gibbons	289	7.6	+1.0
Conservative	Adenike Akinbusoye	263	6.9	+0.7
London Independent Network	James O'Rourke	259	6.8	+2.8
TUSC	Marvin Hay	242	6.3	+1.5
Turnout			37.02	
Majority		1,356		
Labour hold		Swing		
Labour hold		Swing		
Labour hold		Swing		

=== Higham Hill ===
Higham Hill (3)
Party	Candidate	Votes	%	±%
Labour Co-op	Karen Bellamy	2,406	72.8	+5.4
Labour Co-op	Hather Ali	2,188	66.2	+4.1
Labour Co-op	Alistair Strathern	2,061	62.3	+5.4
Green	Louise Ashcroft	587	17.8	N/A
Independent	Tim Bennett-Goodman	385	11.6	−50.5
Conservative	Carl Atkin-House	383	11.6	+3.1
Conservative	Michael Bamber	351	10.6	+3.4
Conservative	Daniel Malachi	315	9.5	+2.5
Liberal Democrats	Patrick Smith	255	7.7	−6.4
Liberal Democrats	Shahnaz Malik	245	7.4	−7.9
Turnout			33.38	
Majority		1,474		
Labour Co-op hold		Swing		
Labour Co-op hold		Swing		
Labour Co-op hold		Swing		

=== Hoe Street ===
Hoe Street (3)
Party	Candidate	Votes	%	±%
Labour	Saima Mahmud	2,409	68.0	+4.9
Labour	Ahsan Khan	2,222	62.7	+1.6
Labour	Tom Connor	2,219	62.6	+1.0
Green	Stephen Lambert	736	20.8	+4.7
Conservative	Matthew Davis	395	11.1	+0.7
Conservative	Svetlana Holloway	357	10.1	+0.9
Conservative	Rachel Wedderburn	355	10.0	+0.8
Liberal Democrats	Letica Martinez	350	9.9	+4.5
Liberal Democrats	James Goodman	348	9.8	+4.5
Liberal Democrats	Thomas Addenbrooke	290	8.2	+3.6
TUSC	Paul Bell	281	7.9	+2.4
Turnout			36.26	
Majority		1,483		
Labour hold		Swing		
Labour hold		Swing		
Labour hold		Swing		

=== Larkswood ===
Larkswood (3)
Party	Candidate	Votes	%	±%
Conservative	John Moss	2,196	55.0	+9.8
Conservative	Selina Seesunkur	2,027	50.8	+5.8
Conservative	Catherine Saumarez	2,008	50.3	+6.0
Labour Co-op	Angelo Da Costa	1,500	37.6	+7.3
Labour Co-op	Rehana Ali-Rahman	1,479	37.0	+8.0
Labour Co-op	Shumon Ali-Rahman	1,412	35.4	+8.2
Green	Robert Tatum	392	9.8	N/A
Liberal Democrats	Leonie Hirst	211	5.3	±0.0
Liberal Democrats	Nigel Lea	173	4.3	N/A
Turnout			44.62	
Majority		508		
Conservative hold		Swing		
Conservative hold		Swing		
Conservative hold		Swing		

=== Lea Bridge ===
Lea Bridge (3)
Party	Candidate	Votes	%	±%
Labour Co-op	Masood Ahmad	2,313	70.2	+2.2
Labour Co-op	Yemi Osho	2,131	64.6	+8.3
Labour Co-op	Mohammad Asghar	2,036	61.8	+1.0
Green	Rachel Barrat	660	20.0	+1.4
Conservative	Elliot Burton	408	12.4	+1.0
Conservative	Irfan Khadim	262	7.9	−3.2
Liberal Democrats	Jemima Miah	252	7.6	−5.3
Liberal Democrats	Zeshan Ahmed	240	7.3	−4.0
Conservative	Mohammed Shaikh	222	6.7	−2.0
TUSC	Martin Reynolds	214	6.5	−1.8
Liberal Democrats	Waqas Qureshi	175	5.3	−1.7
Duma Polska	Beata Gajos	97	2.9	N/A
Turnout			32.12	
Majority		1,376		
Labour Co-op hold		Swing		
Labour Co-op hold		Swing		
Labour Co-op hold		Swing		

=== Leyton ===
Leyton (3)
Party	Candidate	Votes	%	±%
Labour	Jacob Edwards	2,122	57.4	+2.5
Labour	Whitney Ihenachor	2,114	57.2	+3.7
Labour	Simon Miller	1,943	52.5	+2.8
Liberal Democrats	Bob Sullivan	1,253	33.9	+0.2
Liberal Democrats	Ed Bird	1,167	31.6	+2.6
Liberal Democrats	Farooq Qureshi	1,162	31.4	+3.0
Conservative	Patricia Branagan	192	5.2	−1.3
Conservative	Rommel Moseley	190	5.1	−0.7
Conservative	Michael Caplan	176	4.8	−0.9
Duma Polska	Bogusława Danielewicz	96	2.6	N/A
TUSC	Cédric Gérôme	85	2.3	−2.1
Turnout			36.18	
Majority		690		
Labour hold		Swing		
Labour hold		Swing		
Labour hold		Swing		

=== Leytonstone ===
Leytonstone (3)
Party	Candidate	Votes	%	±%
Labour	Clyde Loakes	2,218	67.3	+11.4
Labour	Jenny Gray	2,168	65.7	+11.9
Labour	Marie Pye	2,132	64.6	+9.6
Green	Mark Dawes	628	19.0	−0.8
Conservative	Marian Cristea	425	12.9	−0.5
Liberal Democrats	Muhammad Choudhry	358	10.9	−7.5
Liberal Democrats	David McCarthy	338	10.2	−6.7
Conservative	Camilla Small	338	10.2	−1.9
Conservative	Roger Hemsted	335	10.2	−0.5
Liberal Democrats	David Young	252	7.6	−8.4
TUSC	Mark Best	119	3.6	−1.8
TUSC	Isai Priya	97	2.9	−2.2
TUSC	Theo Sharieff	75	2.3	−1.3
Turnout			36.35	
Majority		1,504		
Labour hold		Swing		
Labour hold		Swing		
Labour hold		Swing		

=== Markhouse ===
Markhouse (3)
Party	Candidate	Votes	%	±%
Labour	Sharon Waldron	2,173	67.3	+4.1
Labour	Asim Mahmood	2,075	64.2	+2.9
Labour	Johar Khan	2,064	63.9	+3.3
Green	Christopher Lemin	625	19.3	−5.0
Liberal Democrats	Laura Offer	379	11.7	−0.8
Conservative	Gillian Hemsted	354	11.0	−2.8
Conservative	Saima Islam	335	10.4	N/A
Conservative	Jenny Leport	286	8.9	N/A
Liberal Democrats	Marek Marczynski	250	7.7	−1.4
TUSC	Ben Robinson	230	7.1	−4.3
Liberal Democrats	Sam Simonds-Gooding	203	6.3	+0.4
Duma Polska	Joanna Dorobisz	106	3.3	N/A
Turnout			34.27	
Majority		1,439		
Labour hold		Swing		
Labour hold		Swing		
Labour hold		Swing		

=== Valley ===
Valley (3)
Party	Candidate	Votes	%	±%
Conservative	Jemma Hemsted	1,764	47.7	+5.2
Labour	Elizabeth Baptiste	1,747	47.2	+14.6
Conservative	Alan Siggers	1,703	46.1	+5.7
Labour	Aktar Beg	1,654	44.7	+9.1
Conservative	Afzal Akram	1,631	44.1	+10.4
Labour	Zaheer Khan	1,582	42.8	+11.1
Liberal Democrats	Ian Paterson	204	5.5	−1.0
Liberal Democrats	Joshua Curtis-Hale	173	4.7	−1.6
Liberal	Henry Boyle	117	3.2	−2.3
Turnout			42.60	
Majority		49		
Conservative hold		Swing		
Labour hold		Swing		
Conservative hold		Swing		

=== William Morris ===
William Morris (3)
Party	Candidate	Votes	%	±%
Labour	Grace Williams	2,429	71.5	+7.5
Labour	Joe Lacey-Holland	2,286	67.3	+7.3
Labour	Umar Ali	2,283	67.2	+3.7
Green	David Hamilton	743	21.9	+2.9
Conservative	Millie Balkan	315	9.3	+1.7
Conservative	Benjamin Connon	303	8.9	+2.2
Conservative	Dexter Coles	288	8.5	+2.4
Liberal Democrats	Jan-Dinant Schreuder	280	8.2	−0.1
Liberal Democrats	Michael Rodden	259	7.6	+1.8
TUSC	Paula Mitchell	229	6.7	+1.8
TUSC	Ken Douglas	187	5.5	+1.6
Turnout			37.10	
Majority		1,540		
Labour hold		Swing		
Labour hold		Swing		
Labour hold		Swing		

=== Wood Street ===
Wood Street (3)
Party	Candidate	Votes	%	±%
Labour Co-op	Ros Flowers	2,496	68.4	+9.6
Labour Co-op	Vicky Te Velde	2,333	64.0	+9.0
Labour Co-op	Richard Sweden	2,262	62.0	+10.2
Green	Christine Olende	612	16.8	+0.6
Conservative	Stephen Murphy	510	14.0	−7.4
Conservative	Moufazzal Bhuiyan	479	13.1	−8.1
Conservative	Humayun Ikram	438	12.0	−6.0
Liberal Democrats	Beth Bramley	359	9.8	+4.6
Liberal Democrats	Suleman Ahmed	248	6.8	+2.3
Liberal Democrats	Sadia Mirza	242	6.6	+3.1
TUSC	Linda Taaffe	184	5.0	+0.1
TUSC	Lee Hawksbee	172	4.7	−0.2
Turnout			38.58	
Majority		1,783		
Labour Co-op hold		Swing		
Labour Co-op hold		Swing		
Labour Co-op hold		Swing		

== By-elections ==
=== Grove Green ===
Grove Green: 10 June 2021
Party	Candidate	Votes	%	±%
Labour	Uzma Rasool	1,301	58.4	
Liberal Democrats	Arran Angus	541	24.3	
Green	Mark Dawes	205	9.2	
Conservative	Shahamima Khan	142	6.4	
TUSC	Kevin Parslow	40	1.8	
Majority		760	34.1	
Turnout		2,229	21.0	
Labour hold		Swing		

=== Lea Bridge ===
Lea Bridge: 10 June 2021
Party	Candidate	Votes	%	±%
Labour	Jennifer Whilby	1,176	50.0	
Independent	Claire Weiss	441	18.8	
Conservative	Sazimet Imre	436	18.6	
Green	Rose Warrington	181	7.7	
Liberal Democrats	Naomi McCarthy	116	4.9	
Majority		735	31.2	
Turnout		2,350	21.0	
Labour hold		Swing		
