= Samuel Page (disambiguation) =

Samuel Page (born 1976) is an American actor.

Samuel Page may also refer to:

- Samuel Page (footballer), English footballer
- Samuel Page (poet) (1574–1630), English clergyman and poet
- Samuel Page (politician) (1857–1916), Canadian politician
