= 2013 Smethwick fire =

Conflagration in Smethwick, England

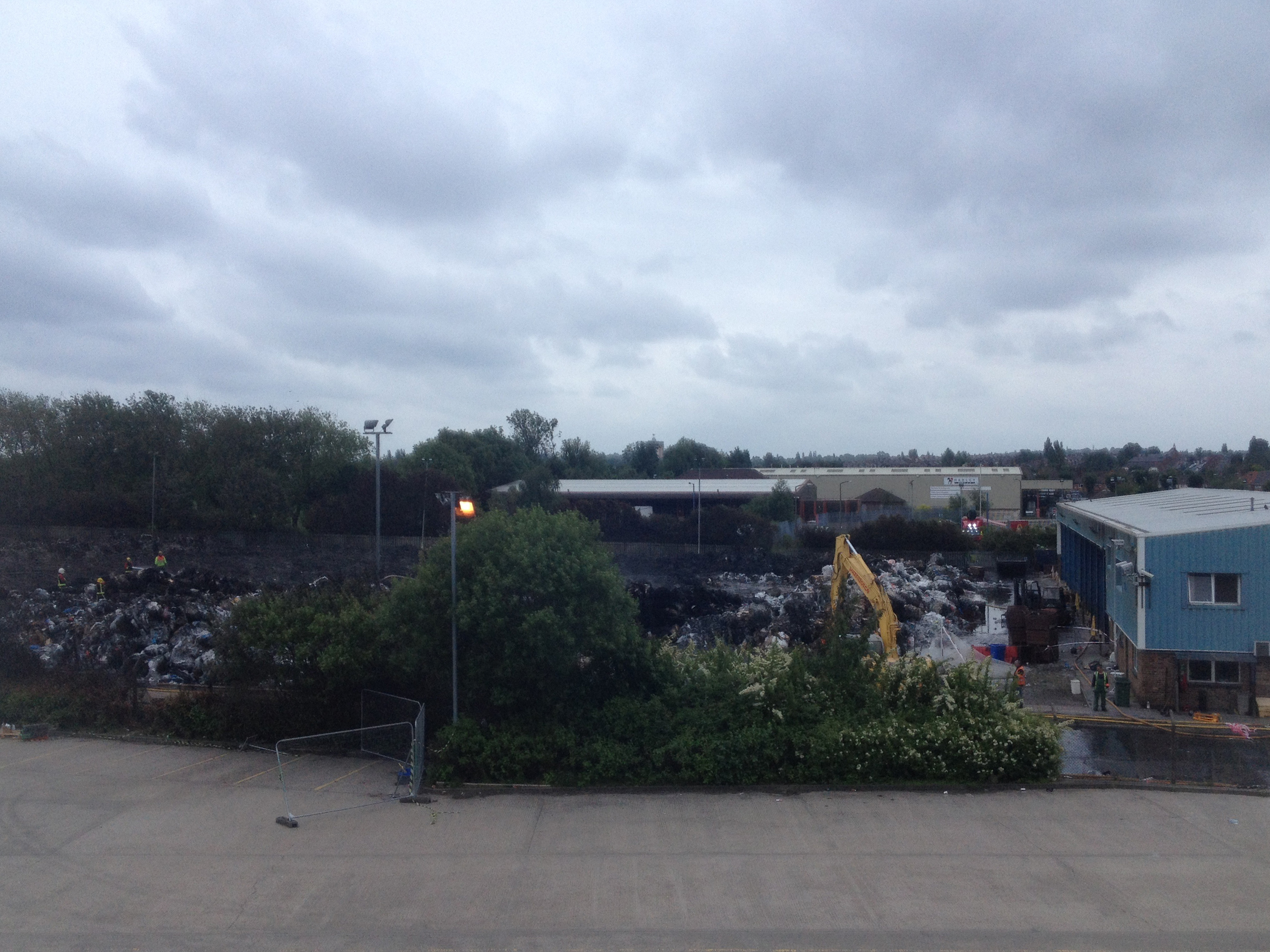
- Aftermath, seen on 2 July 2013
- Date: 30 June 2013
- Location: Dartmouth Road, Smethwick, West Midlands, England; 52.50322°N 1.96942°W
- Cause: Sky lantern

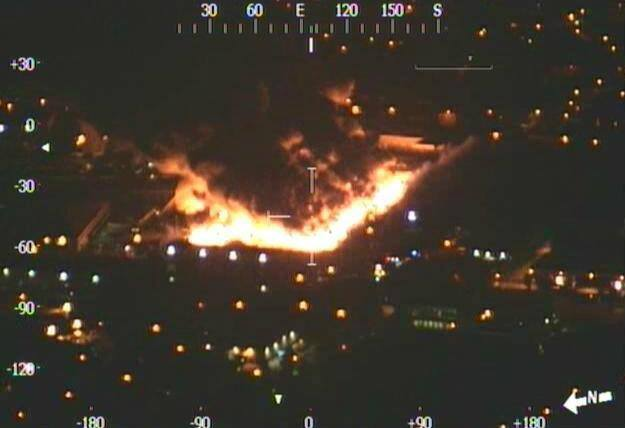
The fire seen from the West Midlands Police helicopter

At around 11pm on the night of 30 June 2013, a sky lantern landed on a Jayplas plastics and paper recycling plant on Dartmouth Road, near to the West Bromwich Albion football ground, at Smethwick, West Midlands, England, igniting the material stored there.

The resulting fire was the largest ever dealt with by the West Midlands Fire Service (WMFS), who deployed over 200 firefighters and nearly 40 appliances, including seven appliances borrowed from Staffordshire Fire and Rescue Service and three from Hereford and Worcester Fire and Rescue Service. Three firefighters were taken to hospital.

The 6,000 feet (1,800 m) column of smoke cloud could be seen as far away as Coventry. 10 miles away in Yardley, the skies were filled with grey ash in the morning rush hour. WMFS received over 400 emergency phone calls.

The Canal and River Trust and the Environment Agency monitored nearby waterways for toxic residues in the run-off water. Birmingham Airport monitored the smoke in case it affected arriving or departing flights. Delays were caused on the adjacent M5 Motorway and the region's road network.

WMFS broadcast live from the site over the Internet, via Bambuser.

Initial estimates put the cost of the damage caused at £6 million.

On the afternoon of 1 July the WMFS called for "an urgent review of the legislation regarding the use of airborne ‘fire’ lanterns", calling on the public and event organisers to stop using them and questioning whether event licences should be issued for events where they were to be used.

== See also ==
- Krefeld Zoo#2020 fire
