= Blackheath, West Midlands =

Town in the West Midlands, England

Coordinates: 52.476°N 2.037°W

Blackheath
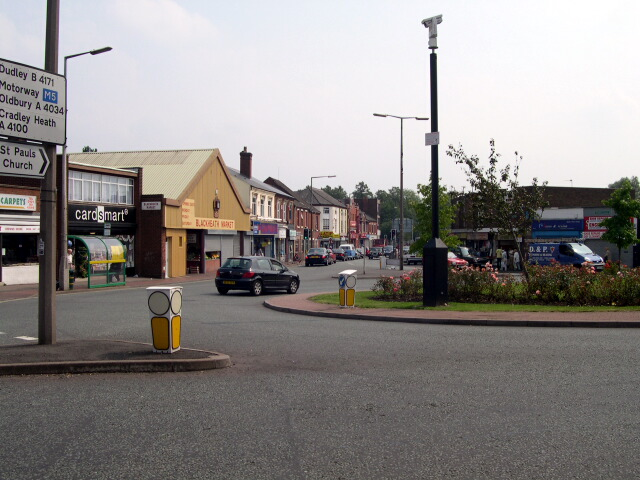
- Blackheath Marketplace

- Location within the West Midlands
- Population: 6,950 (2021 census)
- OS grid reference: SO9786
- Metropolitan borough: Sandwell
- Metropolitan county: West Midlands
- Region: West Midlands
- Country: England
- Sovereign state: United Kingdom
- Post town: Rowley Regis
- Postcode district: B65
- Dialling code: 0121
- Police: West Midlands
- Fire: West Midlands
- Ambulance: West Midlands
- UK Parliament: Smethwick

Blackheath is a town and electoral ward in the Sandwell Metropolitan Borough, in the county of West Midlands, England.

At the 2021 census, the Blackheath built-up area had a population of 6,950, while the larger electoral ward (which includes parts of Rowley Village and Rowley Hall Estate) had a population of 12,065.

== History ==
Before 1841, Bleak Heath or Blake Heath was a small group of farm houses and inns on the turnpike road from Oldbury to Halesowen, within Rowley Regis. The changes brought about by the Industrial Revolution led to a private act of Parliament in June that year that allowed the sale of the Rowley Regis glebe lands in order to finance the building of a new vicarage.

The land was purchased by developers who, throughout the remainder of the 19th century, expanded Blackheath as a dormitory town for the surrounding industries, in particular, the coal mine at Coombes Wood and the Hailstone quarry. Workers migrated to Blackheath from across England and particularly from Wales until the town and its neighbours grew to form the existing conurbation with nearby Birmingham.

A market was established and an extension of the Great Western Railway linking Birmingham and Worcester opened a station in the town in 1867.

On 6 April 1959, the town was the scene of the first major racially motivated incident in the West Midlands when some 30 Teddy Boys clashed with a group of black people.

== Governance ==
Blackheath was part of the borough of Rowley Regis until 1966, when it became part of the county borough of Warley. Since 1974 it has formed part of the metropolitan borough of Sandwell.

It was historically part of Staffordshire until 1966, when the boundaries were altered to incorporate the new borough of Warley into Worcestershire. Since 1974, it has been part of the West Midlands metropolitan county.

== Economy ==
Into the 20th century, manufacturing grew and extractive industries declined with the last coal mine closing in 1919. Major employers were the fasteners business at the Excelsior Works of Thomas William Lench and the electrical engineering business of British Thomson-Houston (BTH). Manufacturing remained the main source of income up to the start of the 21st century with the BTH works still in operation though in the intervening years it has worked under the successive names of AEI, GEC, GEC-ALSTHOM, Hawker Siddeley, BTR and Electrodrives.

Blackheath has always been a predominantly working class area dominated by modest housing. The town was hard hit by the economic slow-down of the 1970s and unemployment of the early 1980s. However, in the 1990s the town became more prosperous with improving housing stock and some substantial development in town centre stores and improvement in the road network. A J Sainsbury supermarket opened in the town centre around this time.

== Transport ==
Blackheath has many transport links with buses travelling throughout the borough and Rowley Regis railway station is nearby.

With rising traffic on local roads after the Second World War, Blackheath became a congestion hotspot. Things improved slightly with the construction of a new road around the north of the town centre towards the end of the 1970s, but this was only of use to traffic coming to and from Cradley Heath and Brierley Hill. Motorists travelling from Quinton still had to negotiate the original route that was little better than it had been in the days before cars. This problem was solved in 2006 with a new relief road that circles the eastern half of the town centre and diverts traffic coming from Halesowen, Quinton and Oldbury.

Blackheath has some of the strongest public transport links in the Black Country. It has direct bus and rail links with Birmingham, while the extensive bus network gives locals a direct route to Oldbury, Halesowen, Dudley, Cradley Heath, West Bromwich, Wolverhampton, Merry Hill Shopping Centre and Walsall.

== Churches ==
The parish of St Paul was established in 1865 as a distinct entity from that of Rowley Regis and the new church consecrated in 1869. There has also been a long tradition of nonconformism with many Methodist and Baptist chapels.

== Education ==
Blackheath Primary School is located in the area, and was originally built by Rowley Regis urban district council on Powke Lane during the late 19th century, incorporating a 5–7 infant school and 7–11 junior school and later including a nursery unit for 3 and 4 year olds. The schools merged in September 1990 to form Blackheath Primary School. It relocated to a site on Britannia Road, previously occupied by Britannia High School, in September 2005.

== Sport ==
Football team Blackheath Town F.C. played in the West Midlands (Regional) League Division One (South) but are now just a youth development squad.

== Notable people ==
- Tommy Smart, professional footballer for the England national team and Aston Villa
- Glenn Tipton, guitarist with Judas Priest was born in Blackheath in 1947
- Samuel Page (fl. 1925), professional football goalkeeper
