= West Midlands Fire Service =

English regional fire and rescue service

Operational area
- Country: England
- County: West Midlands

Agency overview
- Established: 1974
- Employees: 1,909
- Chief Fire Officer: Simon Tuhill

Facilities and equipment
- Stations: 38
- Platforms: 4

Website
- www.wmfs.net

West Midlands Fire Service (WMFS) is the fire and rescue service for the metropolitan county of West Midlands, England. The service has 38 fire stations, with a blended fleet of vehicles and specialist resources.

The service is led by a Chief Fire Officer who is overseen by the West Midlands Fire Authority. The Fire Authority is made up of 15 councillors who represent the seven councils within the West Midlands area.

The service's headquarters is located in Nechells in Birmingham, which is also the home to Staffordshire and West Midlands Fire Control. The control room, based at WMFS headquarters is the main incident management and mobilising centre for both WMFS and Staffordshire Fire and Rescue Service.

== History ==
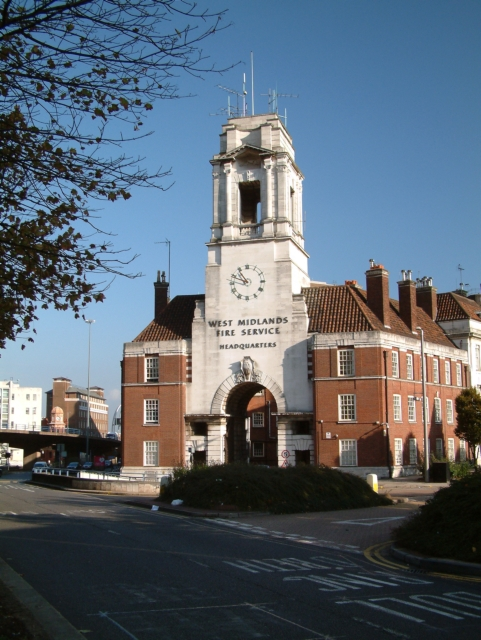
The service's original headquarters, Birmingham Central Fire Station, seen in 2005

The service was created in 1974, when the West Midlands county came into being. Prior to its creation, each of the county boroughs in the West Midlands area (Birmingham, Coventry, Dudley, Solihull, Walsall, Warley, West Bromwich and Wolverhampton) had their own fire brigade, the largest of which was the City of Birmingham Fire Brigade. WMFS was created by a merger of these county borough fire brigades, plus fire stations from the fire brigades of Warwickshire, Worcestershire and Staffordshire.

== Performance ==
Every fire and rescue service in England and Wales is subjected to a periodic statutory inspection by His Majesty's Inspectorate of Constabulary and Fire & Rescue Services (HMICFRS). The inspection investigates how well the service performs in each of three areas. On a scale of outstanding, good, requires improvement and inadequate, West Midlands Fire and Rescue Service has been rated as follows:

HMICFRS Inspection West Midlands
Area	Rating 2018/2019	Rating 2020/2021	Description
Effectiveness	Good	Outstanding	How effective is the fire and rescue service at keeping people safe and secure from fire and other risks?
Efficiency	Good	Good	How efficient is the fire and rescue service at keeping people safe and secure from fire and other risks?
People	Good	Good	How well does the fire and rescue service look after its people?

== Workstreams ==
The service divides its main functions into three areas: response, prevention and protection.

Response covers responding to emergencies, risk-based attendance standards, dynamic mobilising and Fire Control. Prevention covers their up-stream firefighting work that includes safe and well visits, community engagement, vulnerable persons officers and other individual and home-based fire prevention work. Protection covers their work around commercial and business fire safety, licensing and safety around buildings such as high-rise and apartment blocks.

== Chief fire officers ==
The following people have held the office of chief fire officer:

- 1974–1975: George Merrell (Chief officer of Birmingham Fire and Ambulance Service from 1969)
- 1975–1981: Tom Lister
- 1981–1990: Brian Fuller
- 1990–1998: Graham Meldum
- 1998–2003: Kenneth Knight
- 2003–2008: Frank Sheehan
- 2009–2013: Vijith Randeniya
- 2014–2023: Phil Loach
- 2023–2024: Wayne Brown
- 2024–2024 Oliver Lee (civilian interim chief executive officer)
- 2025–present: Simon Tuhill

Brown took his own life on 24 January 2024. The coronial process heard that he believed he had suffered months of alleged harassment and questions about his qualifications.

== Fire stations, appliances and rank structure ==
=== Frontline appliances ===
The service currently uses the following frontline appliances

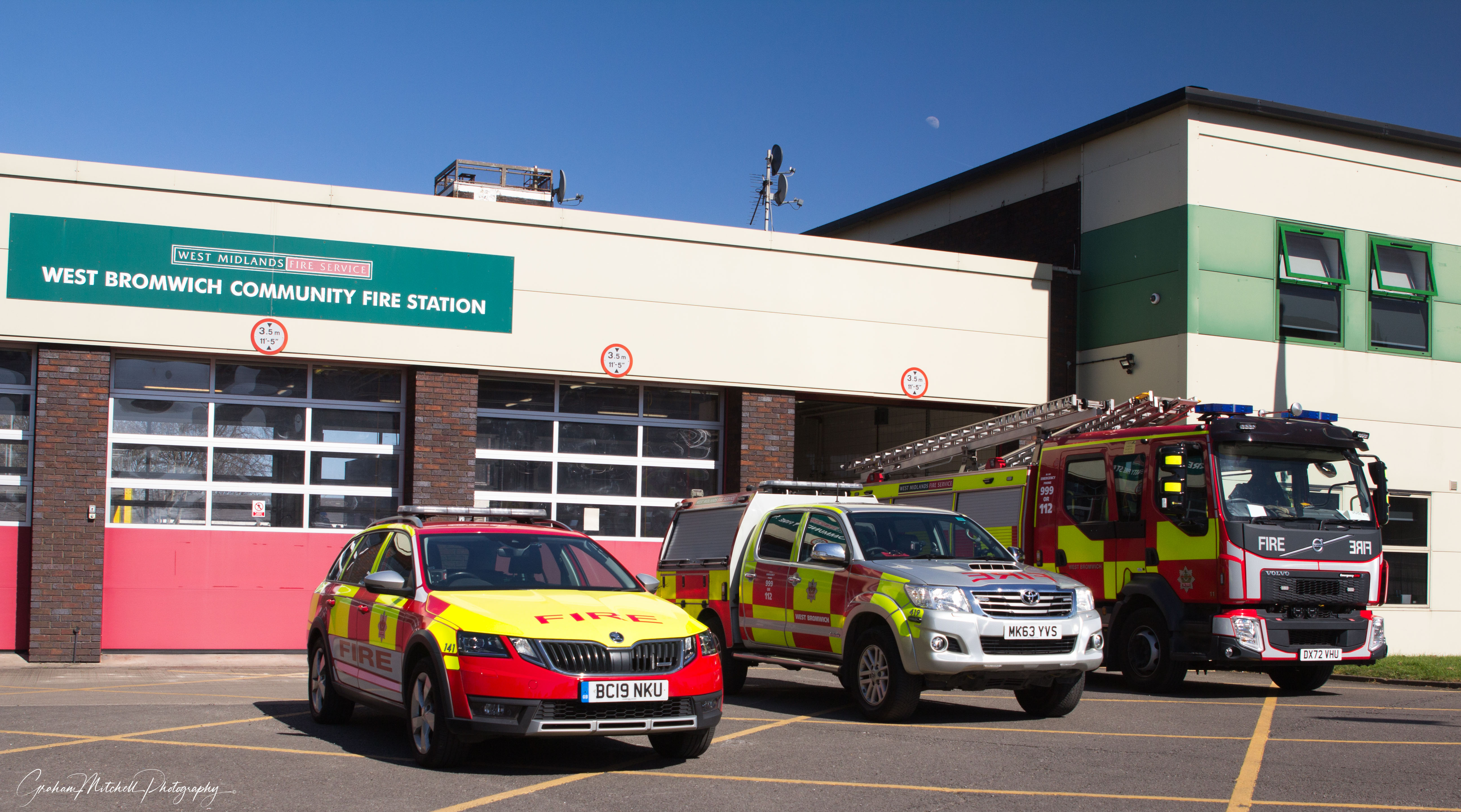
WMFS response vehicles and a pump appliance outside West Bromwich Community Fire Station in April 2025

West Midlands Fire Service operates 38 fire stations and employs 1,350 firefighters. It has no on-call retained firefighters. All fire stations within the service are full-time, and work on two types of shift:

- CORE – 10-hour day-shift, or 14-hour shift-night shift covered by four watches, comprising Red, White, Blue and Green
- LATE – 12-hour shift running from 10 am to 10 pm covered by two watches of Orange and Purple

Tettenhall is the only solely late crewed station.

Following the closure of the Birmingham Central fire station, Birmingham city centre is now covered by three fire stations: Aston located and covering the northern side, Highgate located and covering the southern, central and eastern sides, and Ladywood covering the western side.

WMFS currently operates a fleet of pump rescue ladders, technical rescue pumps, brigade response vehicles, aerial ladder platforms which are also referred to as Hydraulic platforms. WMFS also operate business support vehicles in addition to various specialist appliances and transport vehicles.

== Specialist units ==
=== Technical Rescue Unit ===
Operating out of three locations, a primary base at Bickenhill fire station and two other bases at Wednesbury and Sutton Coldfield fire stations, the WMFS Technical Rescue Unit has provides specialist rescue services such as rope and water rescue, dangerous buildings, and vehicle incidents involving trains and heavy goods vehicles.

=== International search and rescue ===
The United Kingdom International Search and Rescue Team (UK-ISAR) is on call 24 hours a day, 365 days a year to respond to humanitarian accidents or disasters anywhere in the world. WMFS personnel are on call as UK-ISAR volunteers to respond to international incidents.

Twelve members of the West Midlands team were deployed as part of the UKISAR (United Kingdom International Search And Rescue) mission to Haiti in the wake of the earthquake there on 12 January 2010. The team members were joined by two further members who had been in Sweden as part of a training exercise at the time of the earthquake. The team members were involved in the rescue of several people, including two-year-old Mia, who had been trapped for over four days.

=== Fire Investigation and Prevention Section ===
The Fire Investigation and Prevention Section (FIPS) investigates the cause of fire in a variety of different types of incidents including large fires, fires where the cause cannot be immediately determined, and fires where people may have been injured or died. FIPS works closely with the Police, other services, and organisations such as insurance companies when investigating fires.

The officers also work on special projects including arson reduction policies and strategies, human behaviour in fire, the main causes of fire, and the compilation of any information to identify trends in fire causes. This information is vital when undertaking targeted initiatives and campaigns relating to the education of fire safety awareness.

== Notable incidents ==
- 2013 Smethwick fire – 35-pump fire, 50,000 tonnes of plastic and Jayplas plastics and paper recycling plant on fire, sparked by a Chinese lantern.
- 2026 Stourbridge Wildfire - 30-pump fire, several fields and 19 houses destroyed by fire

== See also ==
- Fire service in the United Kingdom
- List of British firefighters killed in the line of duty
- West Midlands Police
- West Midlands Ambulance Service
- West Midlands Search and Rescue
