= Kamifūsen =

Traditional Japanese paper balloon

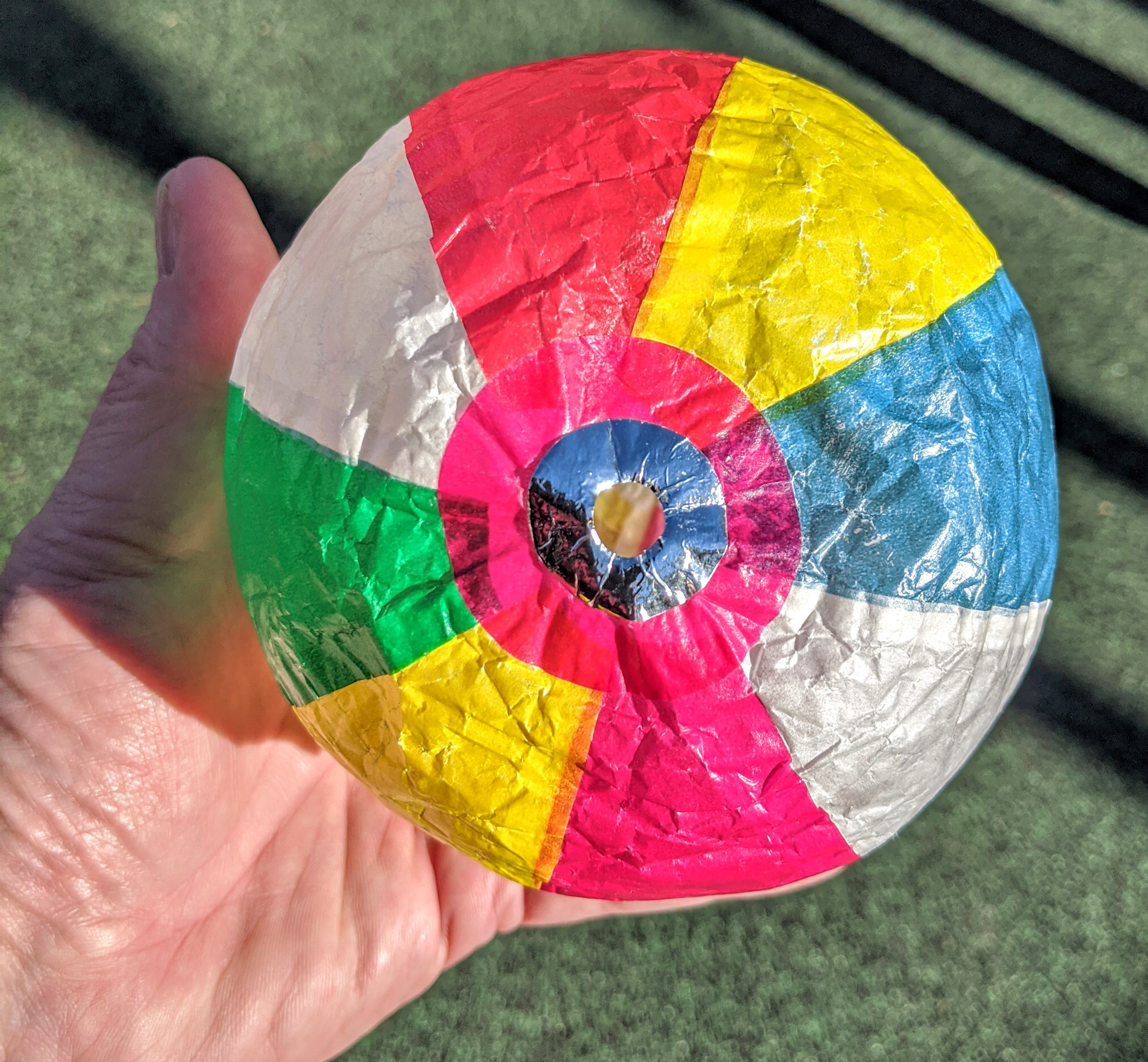
A hand-held kamifūsen

The term kamifūsen (紙風船; literally: "paper balloon") refers to several types of paper balloons in Japanese culture. They are simple toys for children, advertising give-aways for traditional medicine companies, and illuminated flying balloons at festivals.

Smaller kamifūsen are popular as traditional children's toys in Japan. These have an open hole, and reinflate as they are bounced in play. The balloon is made of glassine paper known as washi, which is air-resistant, glossy and thin, and which has sufficient plasticity to allow it to be formed into a new shape, which it can then retain. The properties of these paper balloon toys are of interest to scientists.

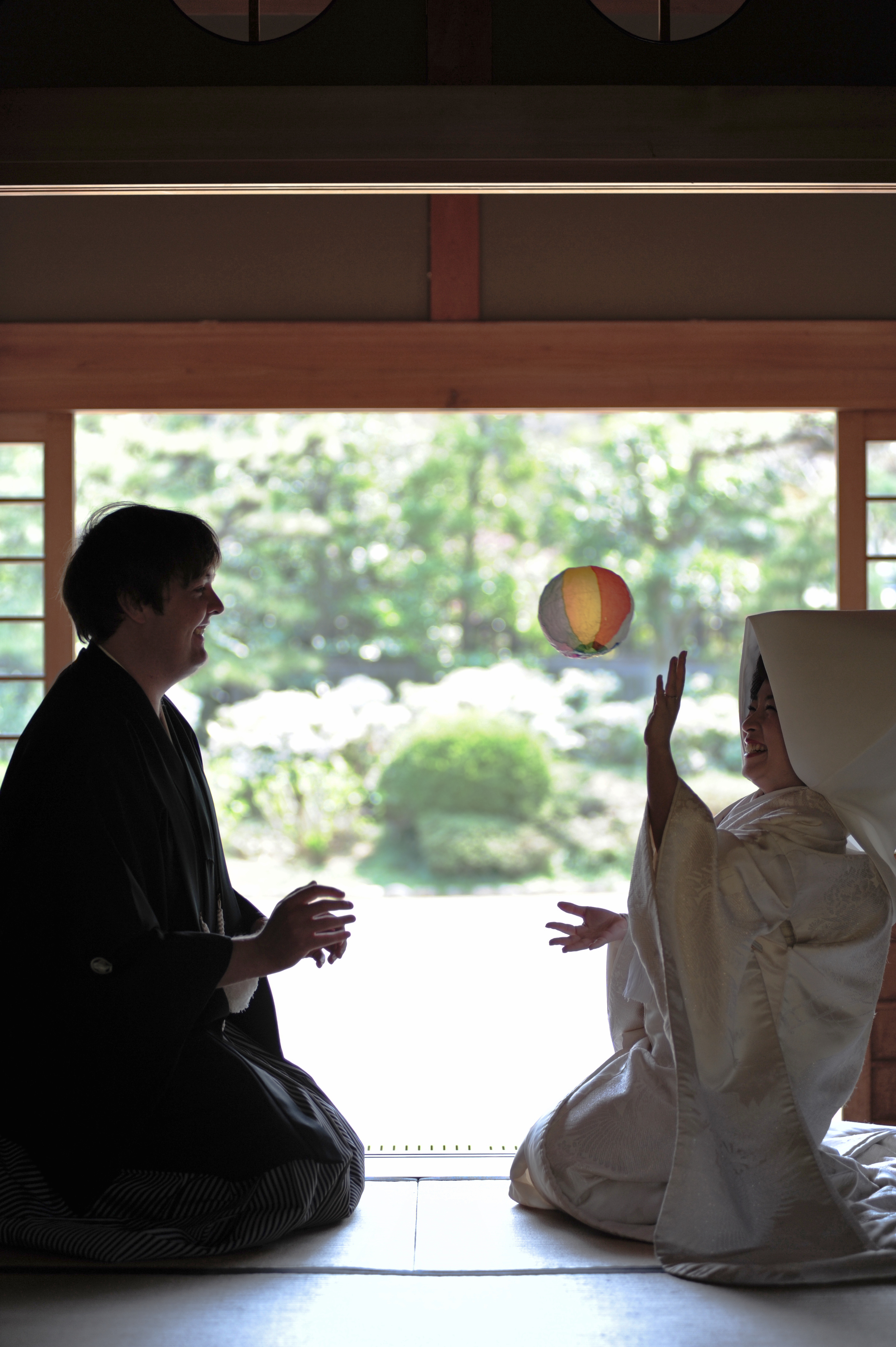
Newlyweds playing with a kamifūsen

Traditionally, kamifūsen were sold in dagashiya, small shops selling candy, snacks and inexpensive toys to schoolchildren as an alternative to the more expensive rubber balloon. They are now sold in souvenir shops and online.

Another variation, known as the kakufūsen (角風船; literally: "angled balloon") is in the shape of a cube rather than a sphere, and is associated with the marketing campaigns of traditional medicine companies. Much larger kamifūsen, resembling sky lanterns, are flown each year at the Kamihinokinai Paper Balloon Festival (上桧木内の紙風船上げ) in Semboku, Akita.

== Physics ==
Toy kamifūsen display some counterintuitive properties that have been studied by scientists. Even though they have an open hole, they tend to inflate rather than deflating when bounced up by a person's hands. According to Ichiro Fukumori of the Jet Propulsion Laboratory, "Despite the open hole visible in the silver patch, the kamifūsen stays inflated when bounced on the palm of one’s hand. Moreover, repeated bouncing causes a deflated kamifūsen to swell by itself to its fully inflated condition. The elastic rebound of the balloon paper is not enough to explain the full inflation; a batted kamifūsen actually sucks in air from the atmosphere."

== Variations ==
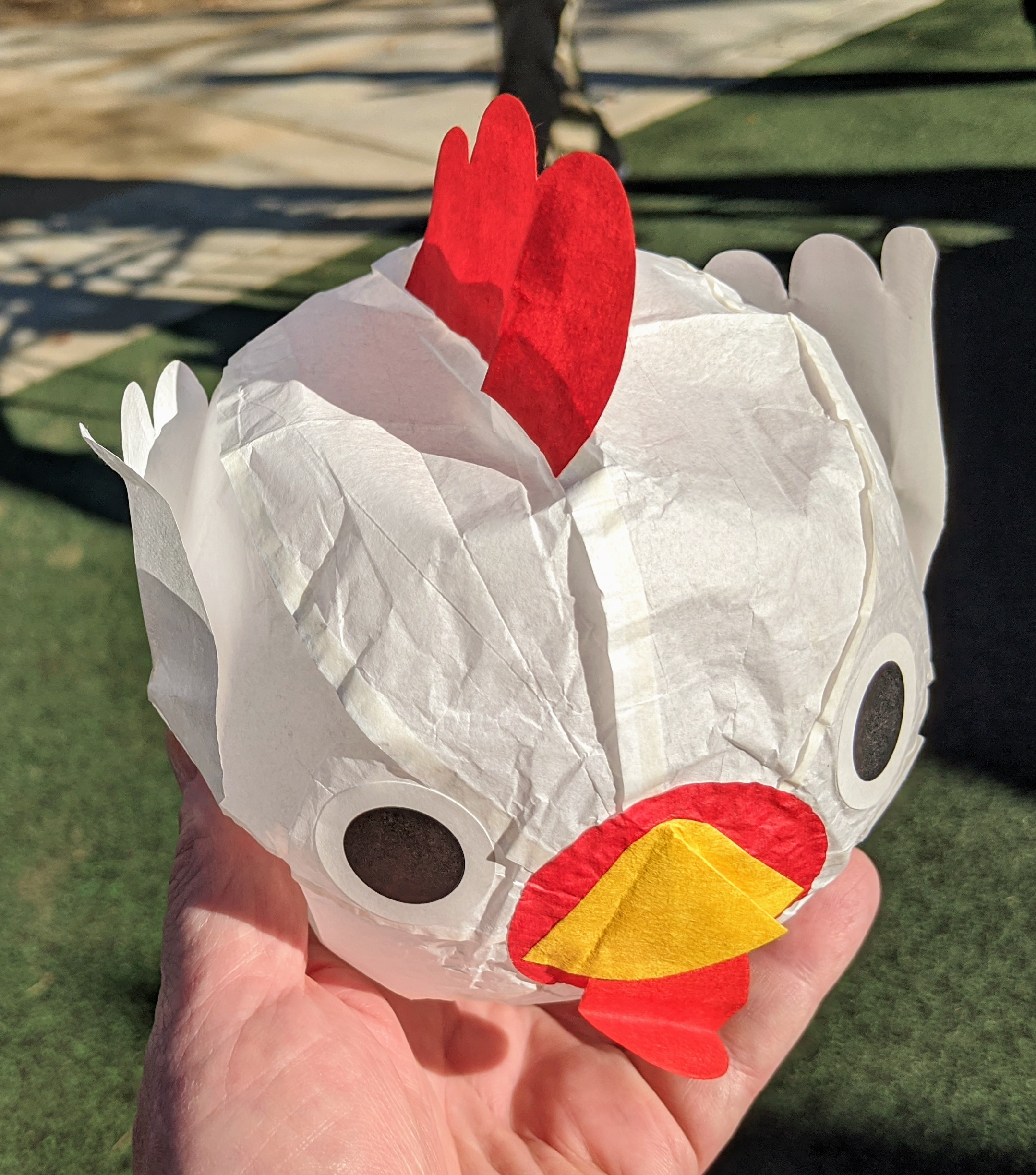
Chicken kamifūsen

Some kamifūsen intended for decoration are made in the shapes of animals, birds and fruits.

A kakufūsen (角風船) (kaku means "angled") is a paper balloon in the shape of a cube rather than a sphere, often used for commercial marketing purposes. Door-to-door salesmen called baiyaku-san (売薬さん) from the traditional medicine companies of Toyama used to give out kakufūsen printed with drug company advertising. Small chests filled with various medicines and bandages were left at no initial cost with customers, and the salesman would return from time to time, to restock the cabinet and collect payment. This system of "use first, pay later" marketing of medicines is called "okigusuri".

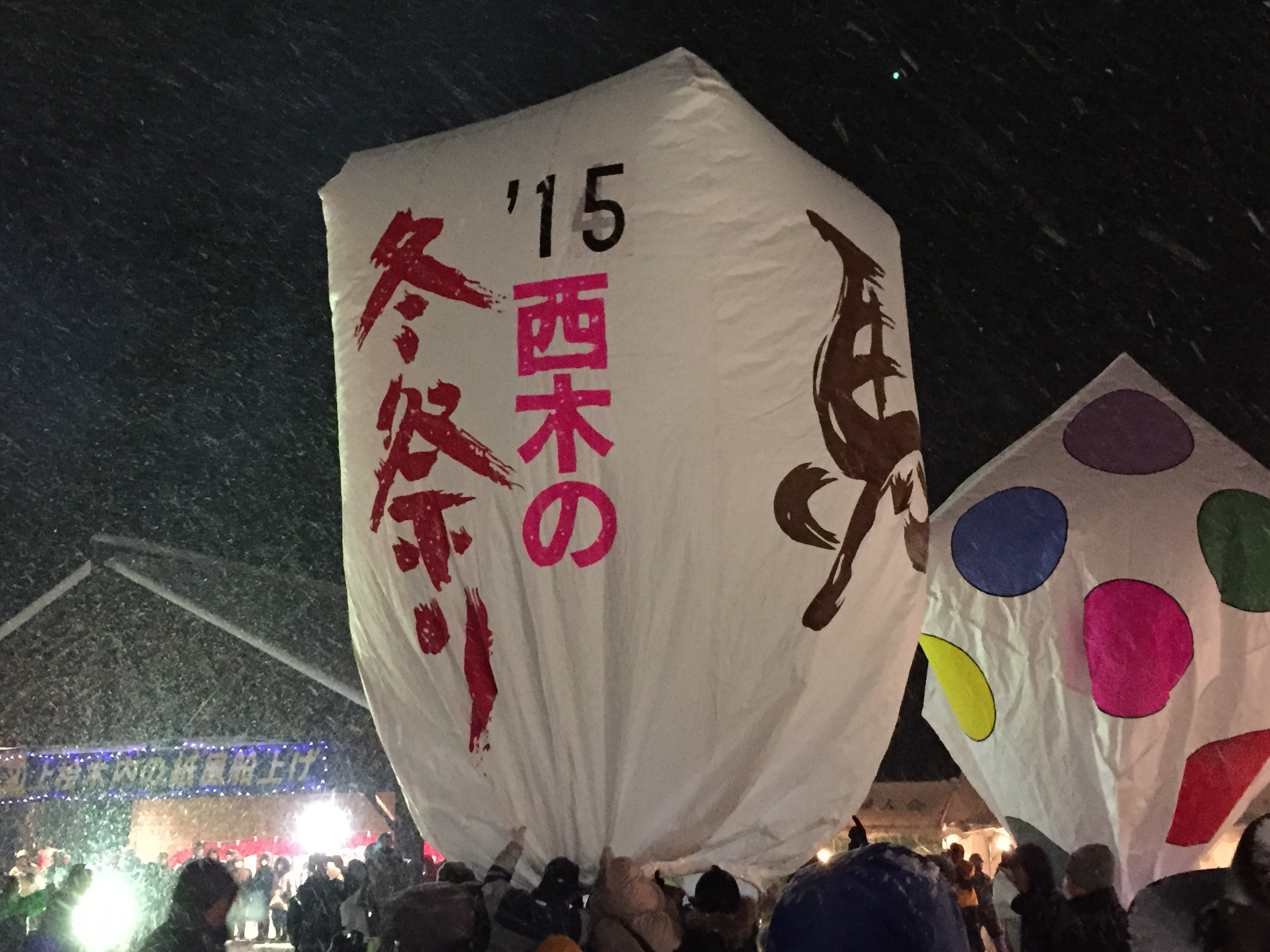
Hot-air kamifūsen in Kamihinokinai in 2015

Kamifūsen being launched at a festival in Yamagata Prefecture

The Kamihinokinai Paper Balloon Festival (上桧木内の紙風船上げ) is held in Semboku, Akita, on February 10 each year. Hundreds of very large hot-air kamifūsen, resembling sky lanterns, are flown for good luck in the coming year. The festival has mythical origins, and was suspended during World War II. It was revived in 1974. According to tradition, Hiraka Gennai (1728–1780), a scientist in the Edo era, introduced paper balloons as markers for the copper mines in the mountains of the region, and also as entertainment.

== In Japanese culture ==
Two major Japanese films have featured kamifūsen in their titles. Humanity and Paper Balloons (人情紙風船, Ninjō Kami Fūsen) is an acclaimed 1937 drama film, and Torasan and a Paper Balloon (男はつらいよ 寅次郎紙風船, Otoko wa Tsurai yo: Torajirō Kamifūsen) is a 1981 comedy.

== See also ==
- Fu-Go balloon bomb
- Paper lantern
- Sky lantern
