= United Kingdom International Search and Rescue Team =

United Kingdom International Search and Rescue Team (UK-ISAR) is a search and rescue team from the United Kingdom that responds to humanitarian accidents or disasters on behalf of the UK Government. The current team structure is classified by the United Nations as a ‘Heavy USAR Team’ (urban Search and Rescue) under the International Search and Rescue Advisory Group (INSARAG) guidelines.

== Membership ==
UK-ISAR was founded in 1993, and now consists of volunteers from 15 fire and rescue services (FRSs). Each service contributes personnel and equipment when requested.

The current FRSs that provide UK-ISAR volunteers include:

- Merseyside Fire and Rescue Service Search and Rescue Team
- Greater Manchester Fire and Rescue Service
- Cheshire Fire and Rescue Service
- Essex County Fire and Rescue Service
- Hampshire & Isle of Wight Fire and Rescue Service
- Kent Fire and Rescue Service
- Leicestershire Fire and Rescue Service
- Lincolnshire Fire & Rescue
- London Fire Brigade
- Scottish Fire and Rescue Service
- South Wales Fire & Rescue Service
- Mid & West Wales Fire & Rescue Service
- West Midlands Fire Service
- Lancashire Fire & Rescue Service

== Capabilities ==
In line with United Nations guidelines, the entire national team are packed and ready to deploy to an affected country within 10 hours of an official request for assistance.

In addition to search and rescue operations, UK-ISAR support the UK Emergency Medical Team with logistical expertise for their bases when they are deployed.

== Previous deployments ==
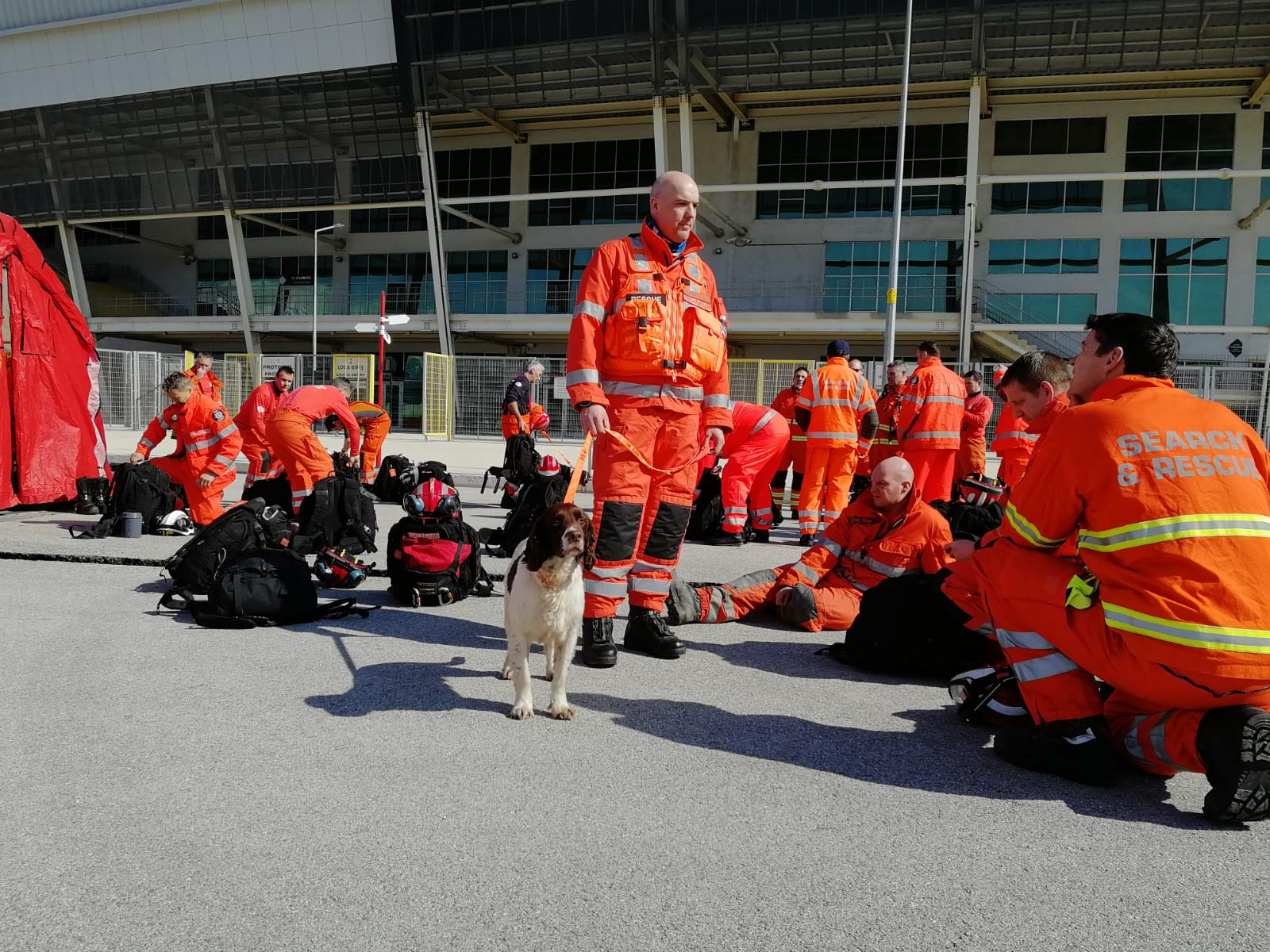
For research & rescue operations during 2023 Gaziantep-Kahramanmaraş earthquakes, ISAR teams in Turkey

Over the last 25 years the team has successfully carried out search, rescue and relief missions in Iraq, Turkey, Algeria, Pakistan, India, Iran, Mozambique, Indonesia, Haiti, New Zealand, Japan, Bosnia and Nepal. Members have also attended many international training exercises including Poland, Italy, USA, and Germany.
