= Krefeld Zoo =

Zoo Krefeld
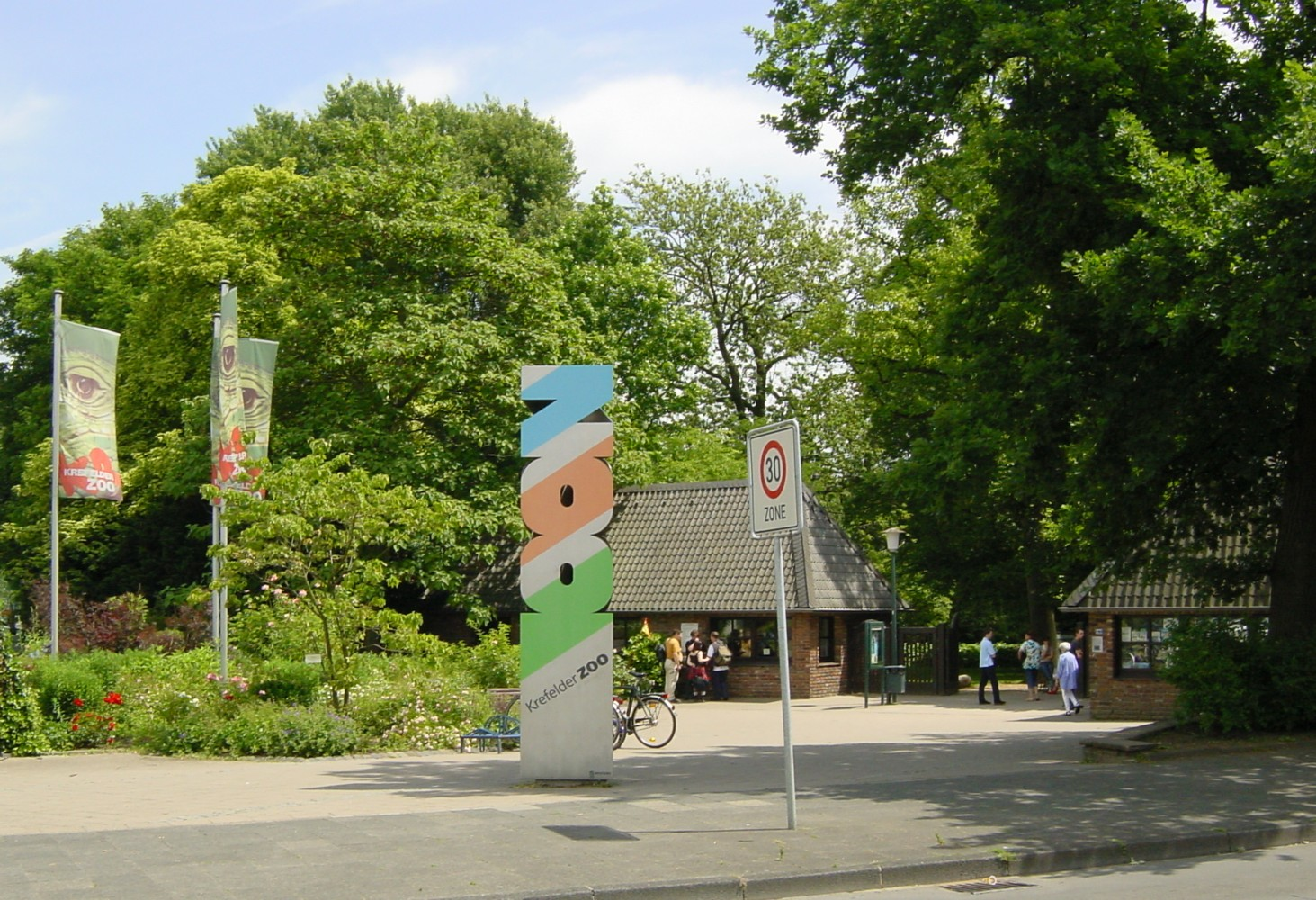
- Entrance
- Interactive map of Zoo Krefeld
- 51°20′28″N 6°36′3″E
- Date opened: 22 May 1938
- Location: Uerdinger Str. 377; 47800 Krefeld
- Land area: 14 ha (0.14 km^{2})
- No. of animals: approx. 1000 (without Insects)
- No. of species: 200
- Annual visitors: 487.373 (2013)
- Director: Stefanie Markowski
- Website: www.zookrefeld.de

Krefeld Zoo is a zoo in the city of Krefeld, Germany, specialized in management of primates, carnivores, fauna from the African savanna and tropical birds.

== History ==
=== Foundation time ===
The zoo was opened on 22 May 1938, as a youth education place at the Grotenburgpark, where the area designed for the zoo was half of the total park area, where some hundred species were kept in 40 enclosures. The first director Heinrich Janßen was previously director for the natural history museum.

=== Development in the 20th century ===
During the Second World War there were air raids on Krefeld from 1940 to 1945, during which parts of the zoo were also hit. Two badgers and a deer were killed, the remaining animals were able to escape through the damaged fences. The wolves had to be killed because of this. In the 1950s, the Grotenburgschlösschen in the park was converted into a café and restaurant for visitors to the zoo. In 1959 Walter Encke took over the management of the zoo. Encke's concern was to take special care of animals of which little was known and to prevent the extinction of South American species by breeding them. Starting in 1963, outdoor enclosures for baboons, penguins and seals as well as a house for lions were built. In 1971 the "Tierpark" was renamed "Zoo". During this time the first elephants, rhinos and orangutans were kept there.

=== Since the conversion into a gGmbH ===
On 1 July 2005, Krefeld Zoo was converted into a non-profit limited liability company (gGmbH). The City of Krefeld holds 74.9% of the company shares, the Förderverein Zoofreunde Krefeld e. V. the remaining 25.1%. The zoo had 65 employees and in addition 21 volunteers did work in the volunteer team as of 2019.

2012 new enclosure for gorillas opened, and in 2014 another for penguins. Since 2014 the zoo also has its own veterinary clinic.

During the night of 31 December 2019 - 1 January 2020, a fire engulfed the Monkey House; more than 30 animals were killed, including orangutans, chimpanzees and marmosets. Police suspected the fire to be caused by sky lanterns, which are banned in Germany due to being a fire hazard; investigators found used lanterns near the burnt down enclosure.

=== 2020 fire ===
During the night of New Year 2020, the monkey tropical house burned down completely. More than 30 animals were killed, including five Bornean orangutans, one chimpanzee and two western lowland gorillas; only two chimpanzees survived. The fire was reported shortly after midnight and took several hours to be extinguished by the fire brigade. On New Year's Day, the Zoo management announced at a press conference that the fire was probably caused by sky lanterns, which are forbidden in Germany due to the high risk of them starting fires. A 60-year-old woman and her two adult daughters, who had purchased sky lanterns online and released them prior to the fire, subsequently surrendered themselves to police. They showed deep remorse and stated that they were unaware that sky lanterns are banned in Germany.

==== Victims ====
- Massa (48), lowland gorilla
- Boma (46), western lowland gorilla
- Charly (46), chimpanzee
- Lea (24), Bornean orangutan
- Bunjo (19), Bornean orangutan
- Sungai (15), Bornean orangutan
- Changi (9), Bornean orangutan
- Suria (3), Bornean orangutan
- Bally (40), (survived) chimpanzee
- Limbo (28), (survived) chimpanzee

== Directors ==
- 1938–1951: Heinrich Janßen
- 1951–1959: Günter Voss
- 1959–1996: Walter Encke
- 1996–2003: Paul Vogt
- 2003–2023: Wolfgang Dreßen
- since 2023: Stefanie Markowski

== Key aspects ==
The main focus of Krefeld Zoo is the keeping of great apes, big cats, African savannah inhabitants and tropical bird species. For subtropical and tropical species the zoo has three warm houses at its disposal, the Monkey Tropic House (since 1975) with gorillas, chimpanzees and orangutans, the Bird Tropics Hall (since 1989) and the 1100 m^{2} Rainforest House (since 1998). Accordingly, another focus of the zoo is the South American animal world, but also the local plant world. The Rainforest House is a South American rainforest with over 400 different plant species. There live Two-toed sloths, white-faced sakis, Leaf-nosed bats, basilisks, iguanas and numerous tropical butterfly species, many of which are now kept in their own butterfly house.

== Habitats ==
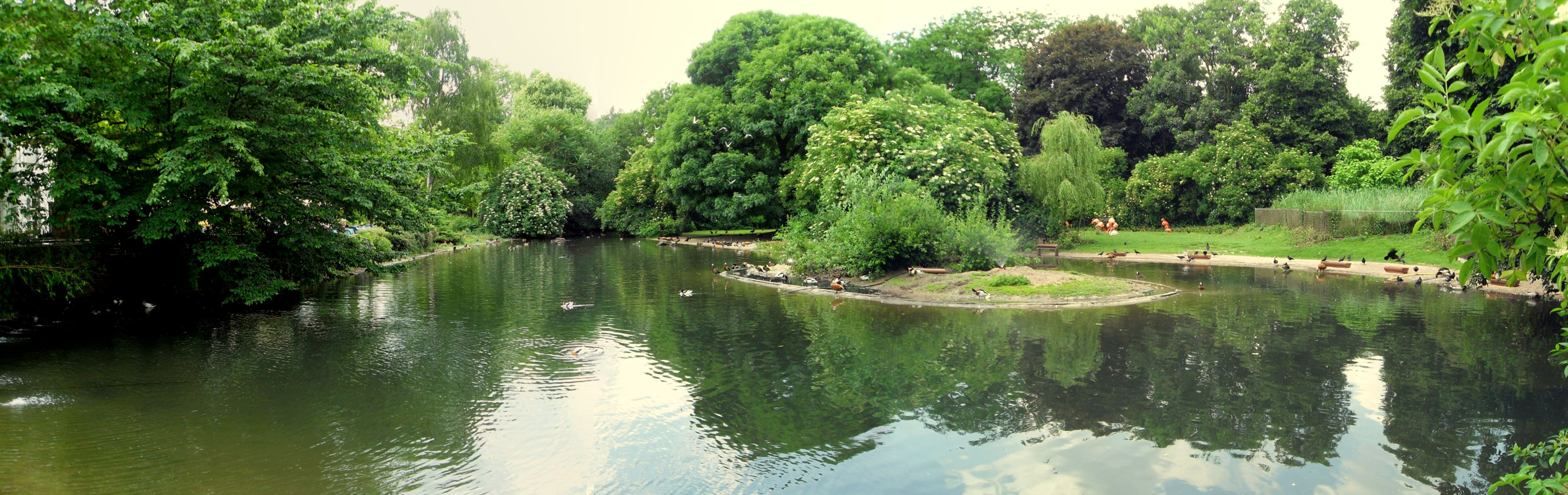
Panoramic picture of Bird Pond

=== Monkey Tropic House ===
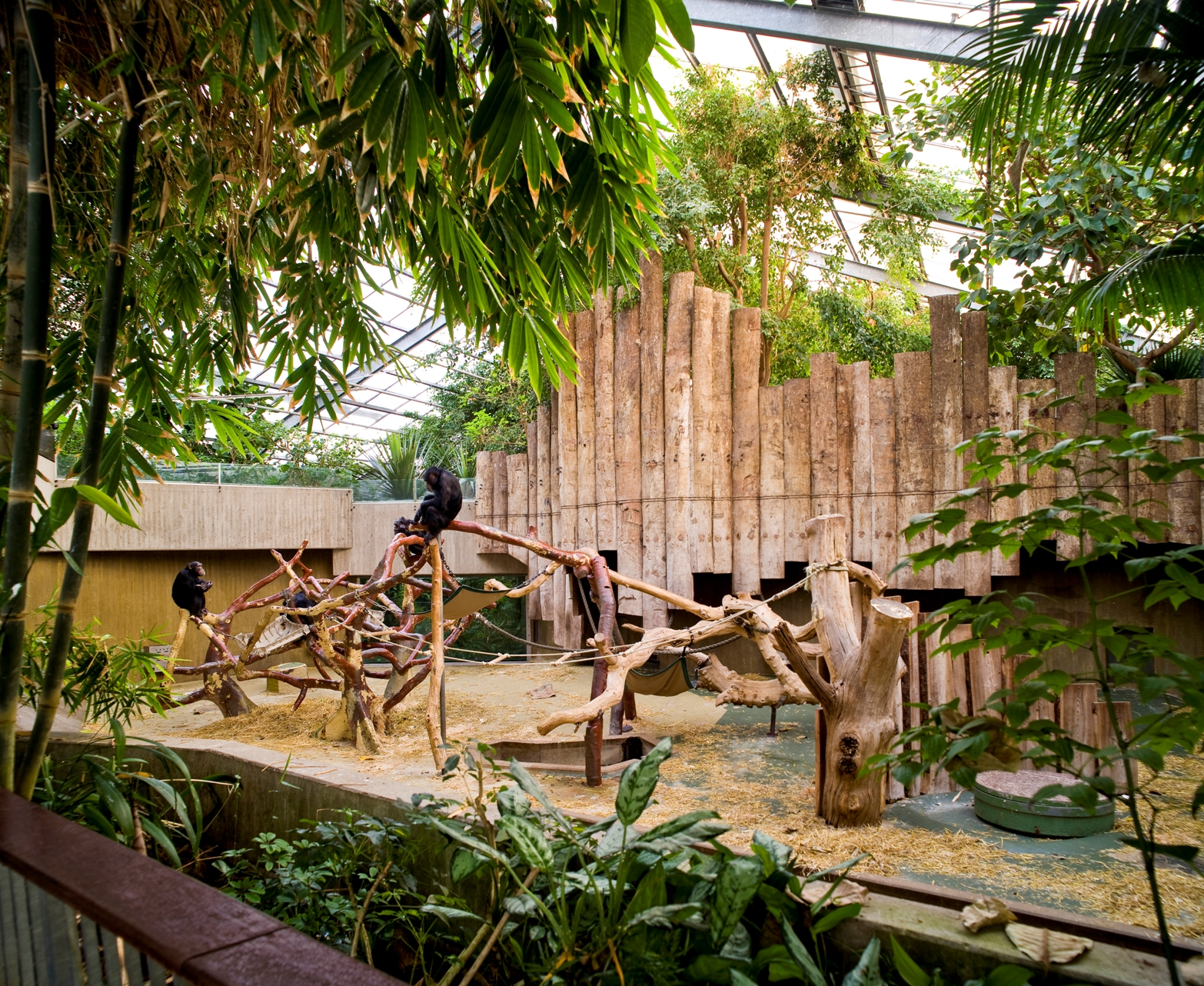
The chimpanzee enclosure in the Krefeld Monkey Tropic House (2010)

The Krefeld Affentropenhaus (Monkey Tropic House) was opened in 1975. The floor space of the greenhouse style building is 2000 square meters. The first primatarium was financed by the Walter Gehlen Foundation and the Friends of Krefeld Zoo. Until the fire, the monkey tropical house was home to orangutans, chimpanzees, gorillas, marmosets, megabats and birds. A temperature of 20 to 26 °C ensured a tropical, humid and warm climate. Each of the different groups of monkeys lived behind a dry trench.

=== Gorilla Garden ===
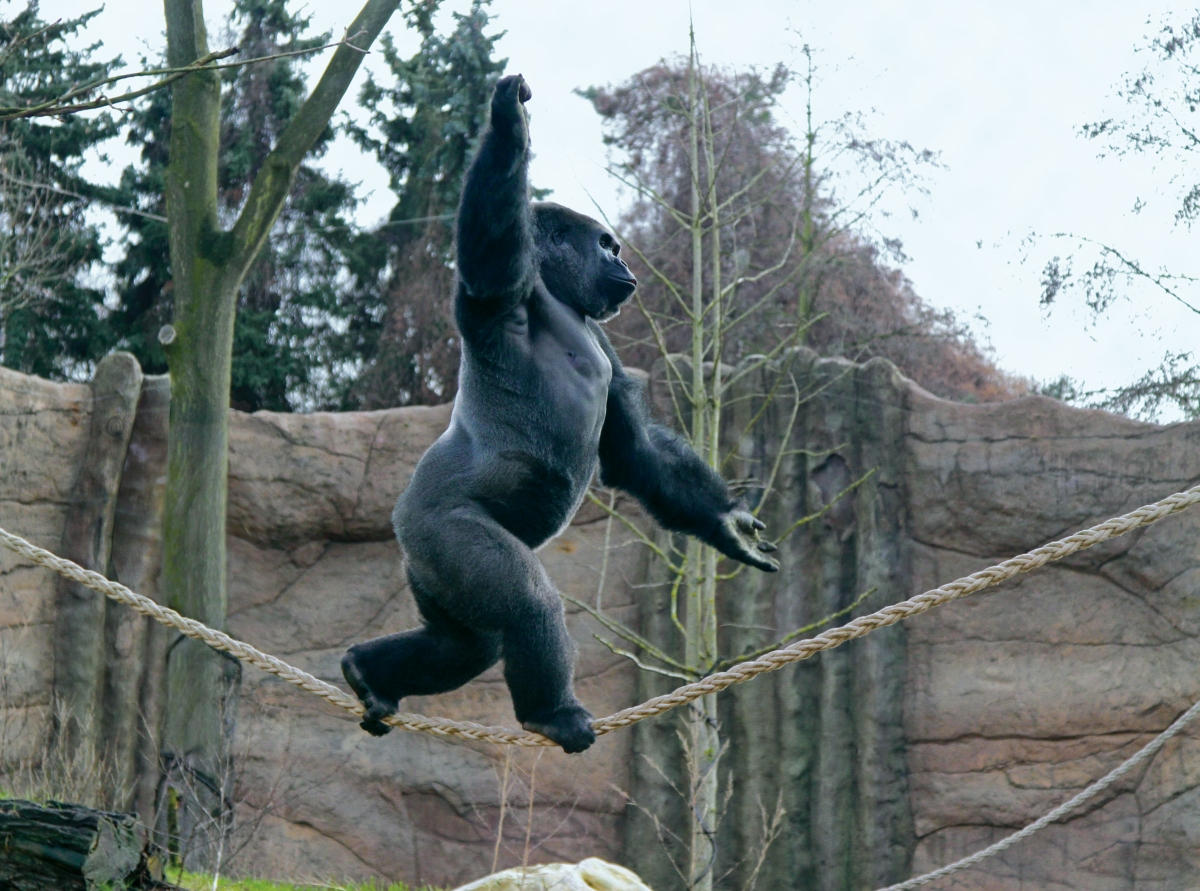
Gorilla Kidogo at his tightrope walk in Krefeld Zoo

Two groups of lowland gorillas have been living in Krefeld Zoo since 2014, but they do not meet each other. In the gorilla garden opened in 2012, the great apes can be observed in action in an outdoor enclosure. The enclosure has an outdoor area of around 1,200 m^{2} with an adjoining 360 m^{2} gorilla house. So far, the following young males have been born there: Tambo (* 2 June 2013, Kidogo x Muna), Pepe (* 6 May 2005, Kidogo x Miliki) and Bobóto (* 31 December 2018, Kidogo x Miliki).

The then new silverback Kidogo brought the zoo into the headlines worldwide in 2012, as it balanced between two trees on a rope tied in the gorilla garden. The gorilla repeated this "rope dance" several times afterwards.

=== Rainforest House ===
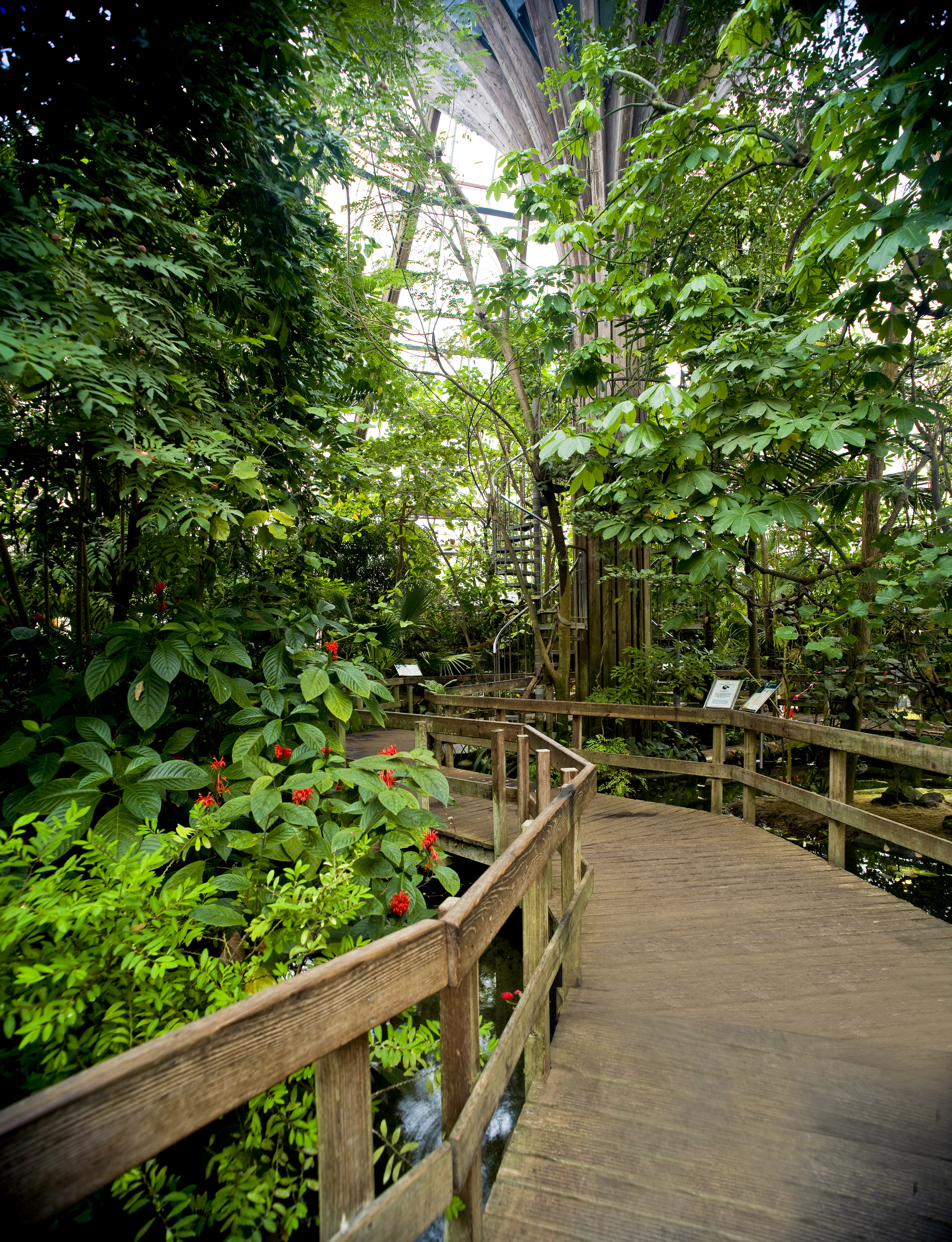
The walk-in rainforest house

The Krefeld Rainforest House with a roof construction of plexiglass and wood was opened in 1998 as the third tropical house of the Krefeld Zoo. Its construction was financed from the estate of the Krefeld entrepreneur Walter Gehlen. It is home to leaf-cutter ants, flower bats, tamandua, iguanas and frontal lobe basilisks, as well as turtles and various species of fish.

White-headed sakis and two-fingered sloths move freely through the 1,100 m^{2} large hall. More dangerous animals such as the wedge-headed smooth-fronted caimans, tarantulas, poison dart frogs and a green anaconda, on the other hand, are safely housed.

=== South America House ===
Three representatives of the large South American herbivores live in the South America house, which is built like a farmhouse: lowland tapirs, capybaras and guanacos. They share the compound with the largest bird on the continent, the nandu.

=== Penguin pool ===
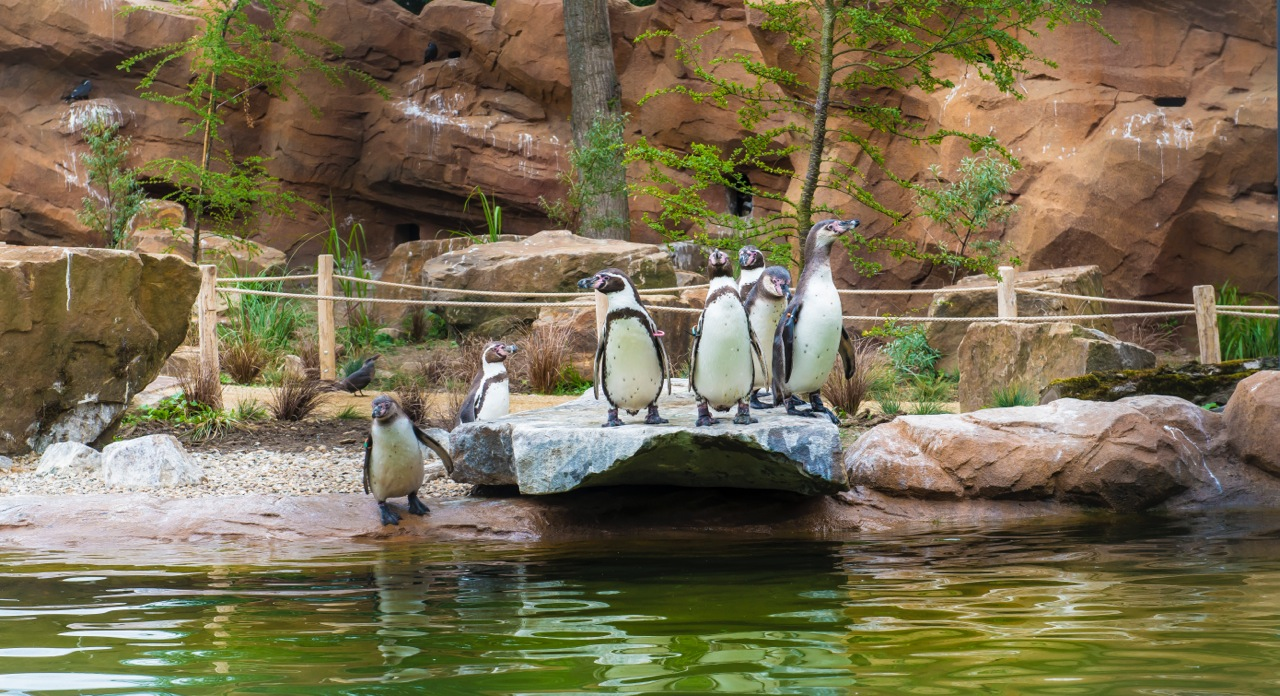
Penguin pool

The 800 square metre enclosure for Humboldt penguins, Inca terns, cinnamon ducks and red-shouldered ducks, which was opened in 2014, is located in the direct vicinity of the Rainforest House and houses a penguin colony of ten breeding pairs. The terrain for the penguins is divided into two thirds land area and one third water area. The natural habitat of the penguins was the model for the design of the new enclosure, especially the artificial rock face: the coastal regions of northern Chile and Peru on the cold Humboldt Current. The entire enclosure was covered with a net construction, so that in addition to Humboldt penguins, Inca terns, cinnamon and red-shouldered ducks can also be kept. Humboldt penguins have two layers of plumage, but for particularly frosty winters, a small warm house is available for the residents of the complex. Visitors can observe the animals directly in the walk-in enclosure even under water [13].

=== African Savannah ===
The African savannah at Krefeld Zoo is 1 hectare in size and represents a section of a savannah landscape. Large kudus, impalas and ostriches live in the open landscape. The way to the Africa meadow led over several construction stages. At the beginning of 2014 a stable for the antelopes and ostriches was completed. At present a pelican lagoon is being built on the former zebra enclosure.

=== Large animal house ===
The large animal house was built in 1977, it houses a double Asian elephant, a family of black rhinos and a pygmy hippopotamus . Krefeld Zoo is one of five zoos in Germany that are able to achieve success in breeding this African species.

In 2010 the elephant keeping was rebuilt and the elephant keeping was changed from chain keeping to box keeping. This was based on new findings on the social behaviour of the animals and changes in husbandry regulations. Since then the two elephant cows Rhena and Mumptas Mahal can spend the night hours without being chained.

=== Rhinoceros facility ===
In April 2015, construction work began on the new rhino enclosure, which directly borders the large African meadow. The construction work was completed in spring 2016.

=== Butterfly Jungle ===
In 2010 the butterfly jungle at Krefeld Zoo was opened. Up to 200 butterflies live there in tropical vegetation. These include the Blue Morphof butterfly or the "poisoner" passion flower butterfly. The hatching of the butterflies can be followed on the caterpillar boxes of the butterfly jungle. There, the entire life cycle of a butterfly can be observed from egg to caterpillar and pupa to adult butterfly.

=== Birdhouse ===
Birds from three continents live in the Krefeld bird house in a tropical and humid climate. The themes of the aviary are "South-East Asia", "South America", "Madagascar", and "Africa". In the Bird Tropics Hall you can also find free-living birds.

=== Meerkat Lodge ===
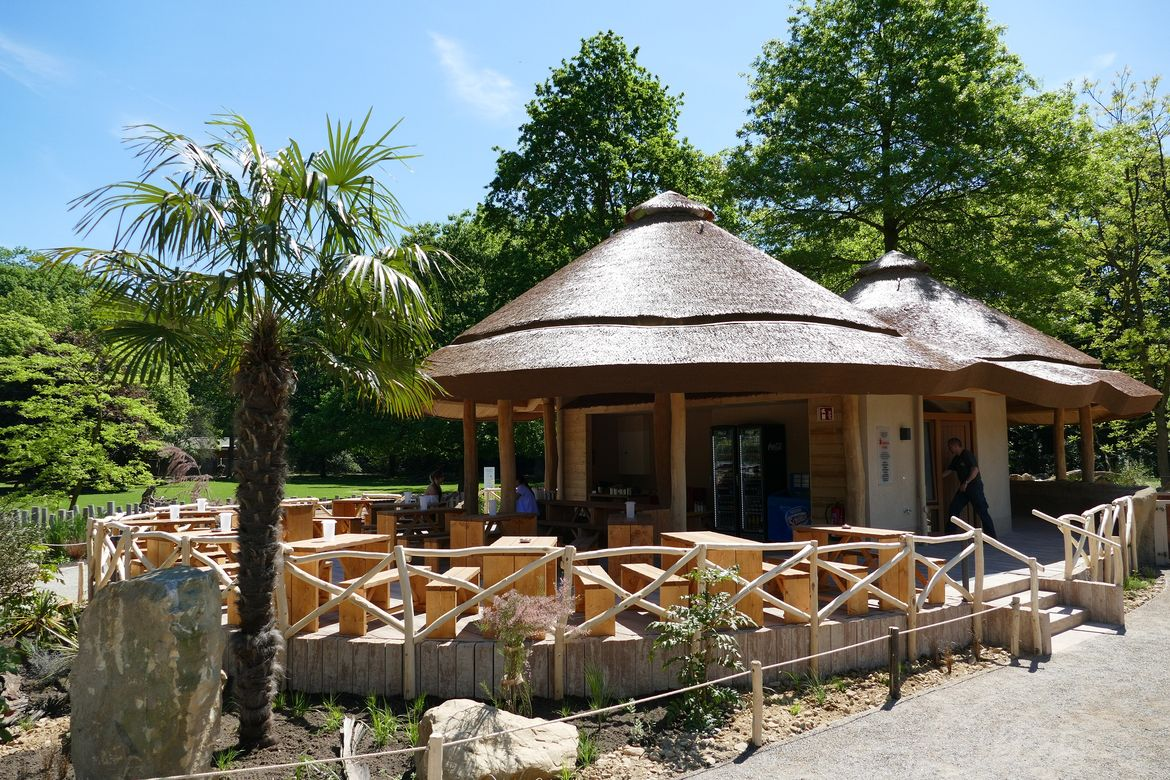
Meerkat lodge of the Krefeld zoo (2017)

The meerkat lodge was opened in 2017. Following typical African mud huts, two interconnected circular buildings were built, which house the meerkat facility and a viewing terrace with drinks. Breeder Toni disappeared without trace on 2 June 2018; the 3-year-old male Kimya from Münster Zoo succeeded him. At the end of November 2018, Amari, who was born in Krefeld in March 2018, gave birth to two kittens. In 2019 a total of 12 animals were living in the enclosure.

== Species protection, conservation breeding and research ==
Krefeld Zoo is committed to nature and species conservation at various levels. It has been a member of the WAZA (World Zoo Organisation) since 1963, the EAZA (European Association of Zoos and Aquariums) since 1988 and the Stiftung Artenschutz (Foundation for Species Conservation) founded by German zoos since 2001.

=== Conservation breeding ===
By keeping stud books, in which the pedigree of an animal species is listed, and with the help of special breeding programs, ideal breeding pairs are put together at Krefeld Zoo. In this way, the Zoo helps to maintain and breed a healthy population of endangered animal species (ex-situ conservation).

Krefeld Zoo currently participates in 49 breeding programmes. These are divided into eight international conservation breeding programmes (IPM), including Sumatran Tiger, Black Rhino and Cheetah, 24 European conservation breeding programmes (EEP), including Snow Leopard and chimpanzee, and 17 European stud books (ESB), including Spoonbill and Blue Duiker. For all conservation breeding programmes, Krefeld Zoo follows the recommendations of the respective zoo bookkeepers. Krefeld Zoo keeps the stud book for European otters, Goodfellow's kangaroos and tamanduas (small anteaters).

In 1998 Krefeld Zoo succeeded in breeding crocodile keepers from Africa for the first time in the world - a breeding specialist: In nature, the birds lay their eggs in sunlit sandy areas where they are incubated without parental involvement. Inspired by the results of field studies, Dr. Wolfgang Dreßen had underfloor heating as well as heat and light radiators installed - with corresponding success.

In 2002, the cheetah female "Catherine", released by burglars, killed ten grey giant kangaroos following her hunting instinct and thus destroyed the corresponding breeding group of the zoo. The kangaroo baby with the name "Lismore", which survived the attack in the pouch of its mother who was killed in the process, became famous. It was then looked after and cared for around the clock by a nurse from the zoo.

In 2006, Davu became the first black rhino to be born in a zoo in North Rhine-Westphalia. Four more young animals followed in 2008, 2010, 2013 and 2016.

== Sustainable water management ==
Krefeld Zoo has been using water sustainably since 2010. The project "Sustainable water management in the zoo" was developed for this purpose. The main objectives of the project are water conservation and environmental education of school classes.

As part of the project, two constructed wetlands and a new groundwater well were built on the Zoo grounds. Thanks to the use of the constructed wetland, the sea lions and the penguin pool now only need to be cleaned every six months instead of once a week, which has saved more than 500,000 cubic metres of water 2010 and March 2015. The increased algae formation in spring - a natural process - is not removed by chemicals, but by recreational divers who remove excessive algae growth from the two pools.

The educational part of the water project was launched in 2014: In the zoo, school classes from all types of schools can work on various curriculum-relevant aspects on the topics of "water", "food chain", "marine pollution" or "water cycle in the rainforest", with the constructed wetlands being included in the lessons. The students analyse water samples in their own laboratory and practically reproduce the purification process.

== Art-Project affenBRUT 2007 ==
In cooperation with an art education agency, the Zoo started the fundraising project affenBRUT in October 2007. Sold are paintings painted by two female orangutans and a male called Barito. Most of the proceeds from the "monkey art" went into animal employment. Barito moved to the Zoo de la Palmyre in France in mid-2014.
