= Sky lantern =

Small hot air balloon made to be released into the air

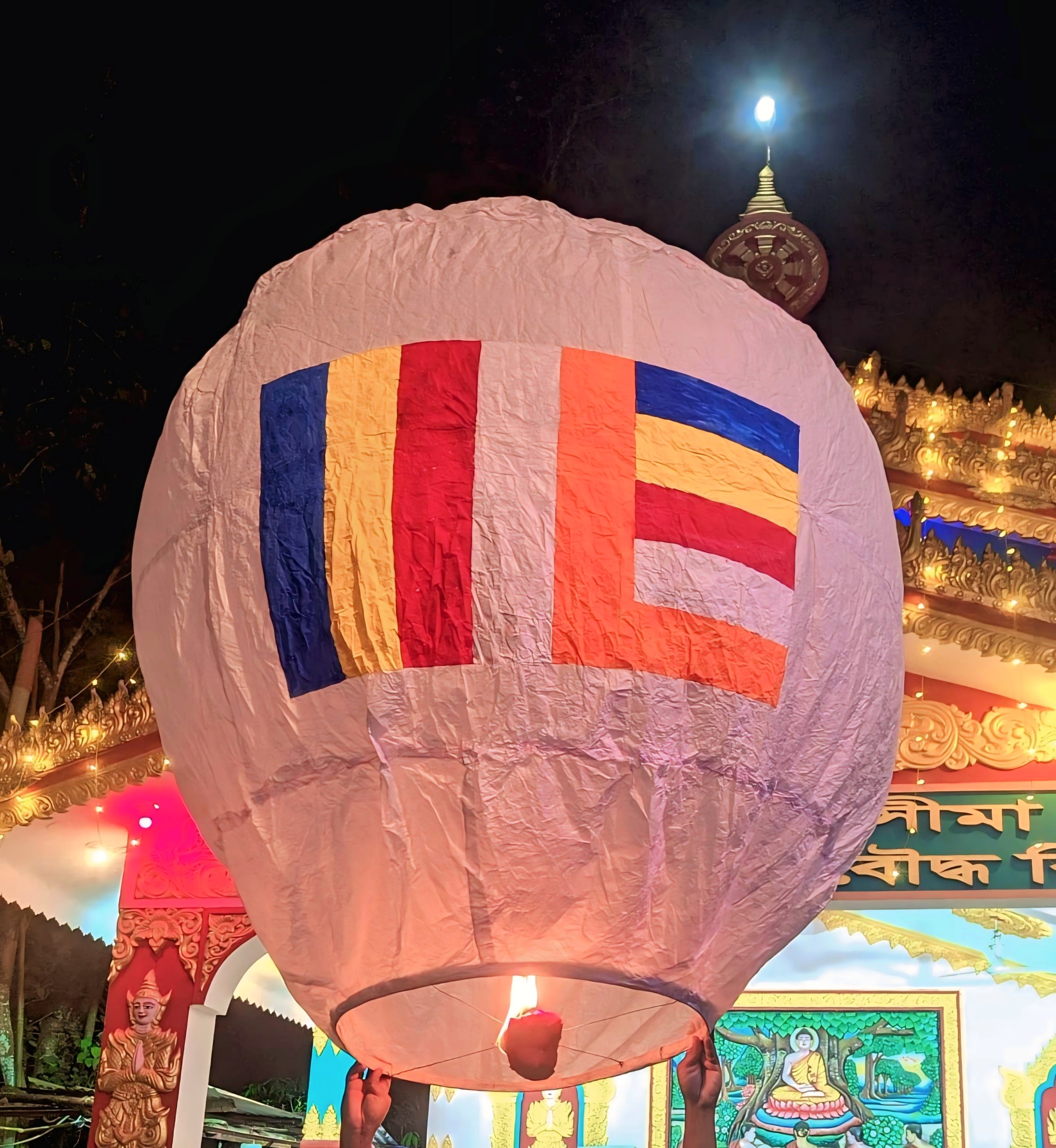
Buddhist Flag depicted in traditional lantern in Bangladesh

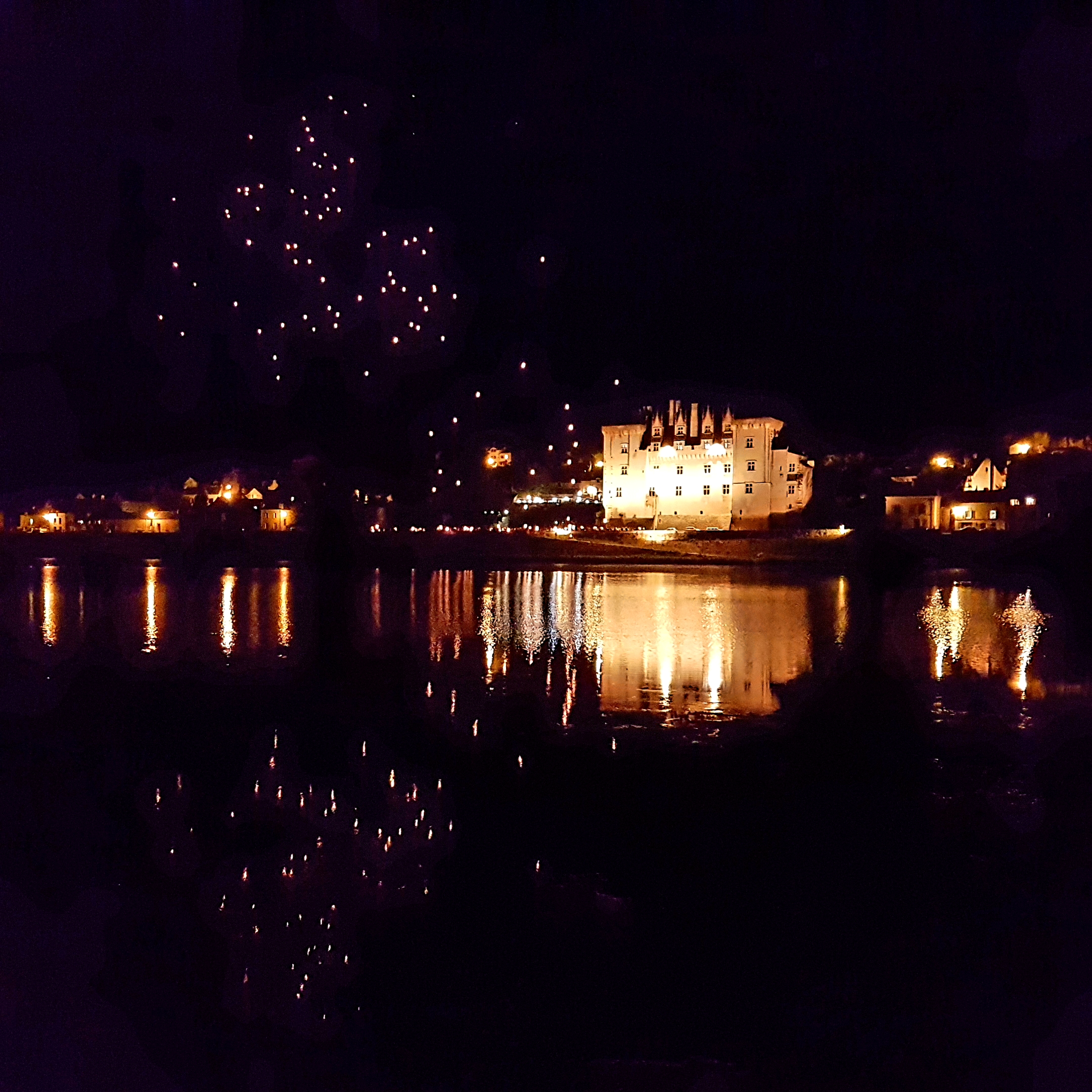
Sky lanterns, Château de Montsoreau-Museum of Contemporary Art, Loire Valley, France

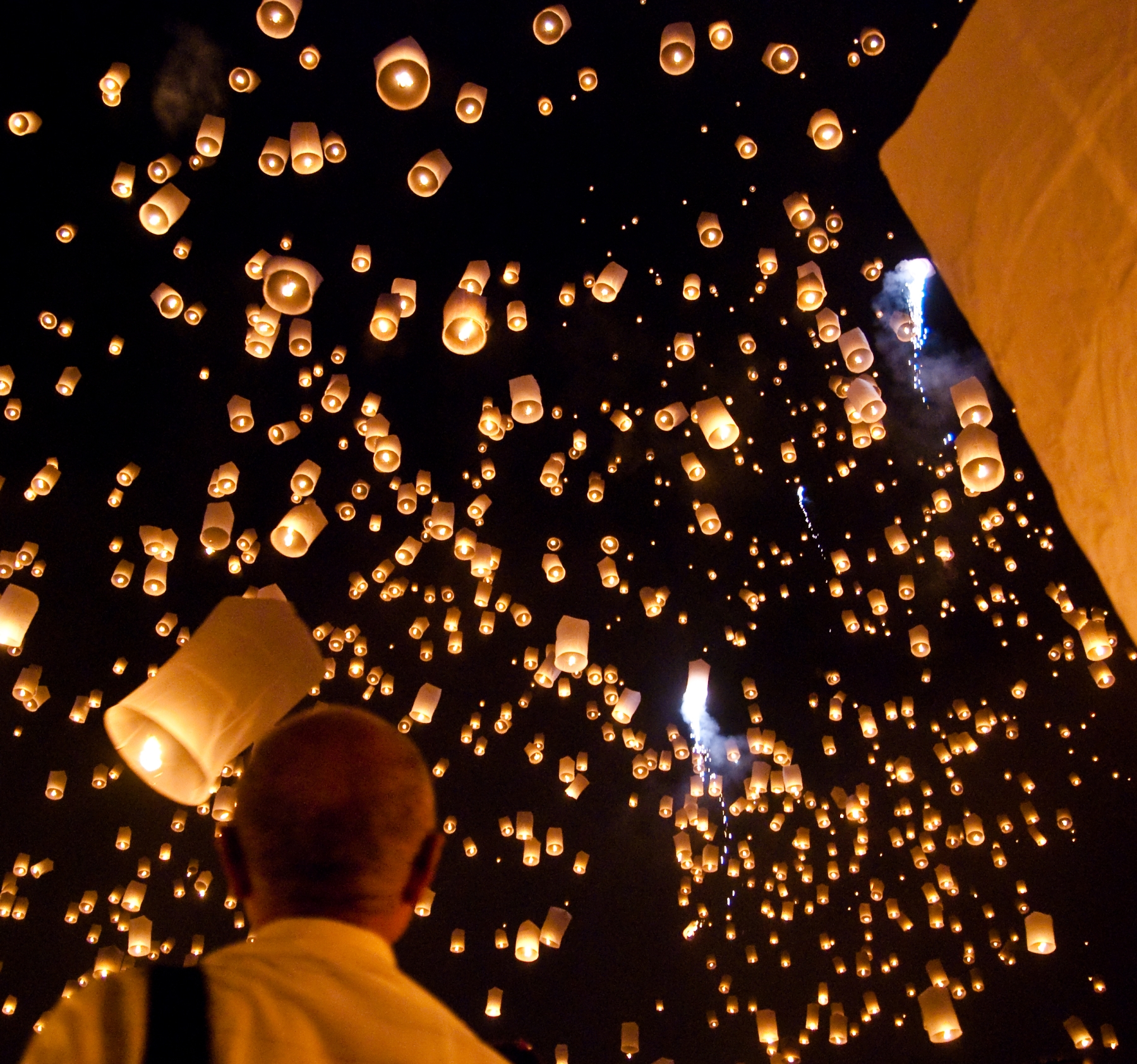
Yi Peng (Loi Krathong) festival in Tudongkasatan Lanna (Lanna Meditation Retreat Centre), Mae Jo Chiang Mai, Thailand

A sky lantern (traditional Chinese: 天燈; simplified Chinese: 天灯; pinyin: Tiāndēng), also known as a Kongming lantern (traditional Chinese: 孔明燈; simplified Chinese: 孔明灯; pinyin: Kǒngmíng dēng), is a small hot air balloon made of paper, with an opening at the bottom where a small fire is suspended.

Sky lanterns have been made for centuries in cultures around the world, to be launched for play or as part of long-established festivities. The name sky lantern is a translation of the Chinese name but they have also been referred to as sky candles or fire balloons.

Several fires have been attributed to sky lanterns, with at least two 21st-century cases where deaths occurred. Sky lanterns have been made illegal in several countries such as Vietnam which has banned the production, sale, and release of sky lanterns throughout the country since 2009. Many areas of Asia do not permit sky lanterns because of widespread fire hazards as well as danger to livestock.

== Construction ==
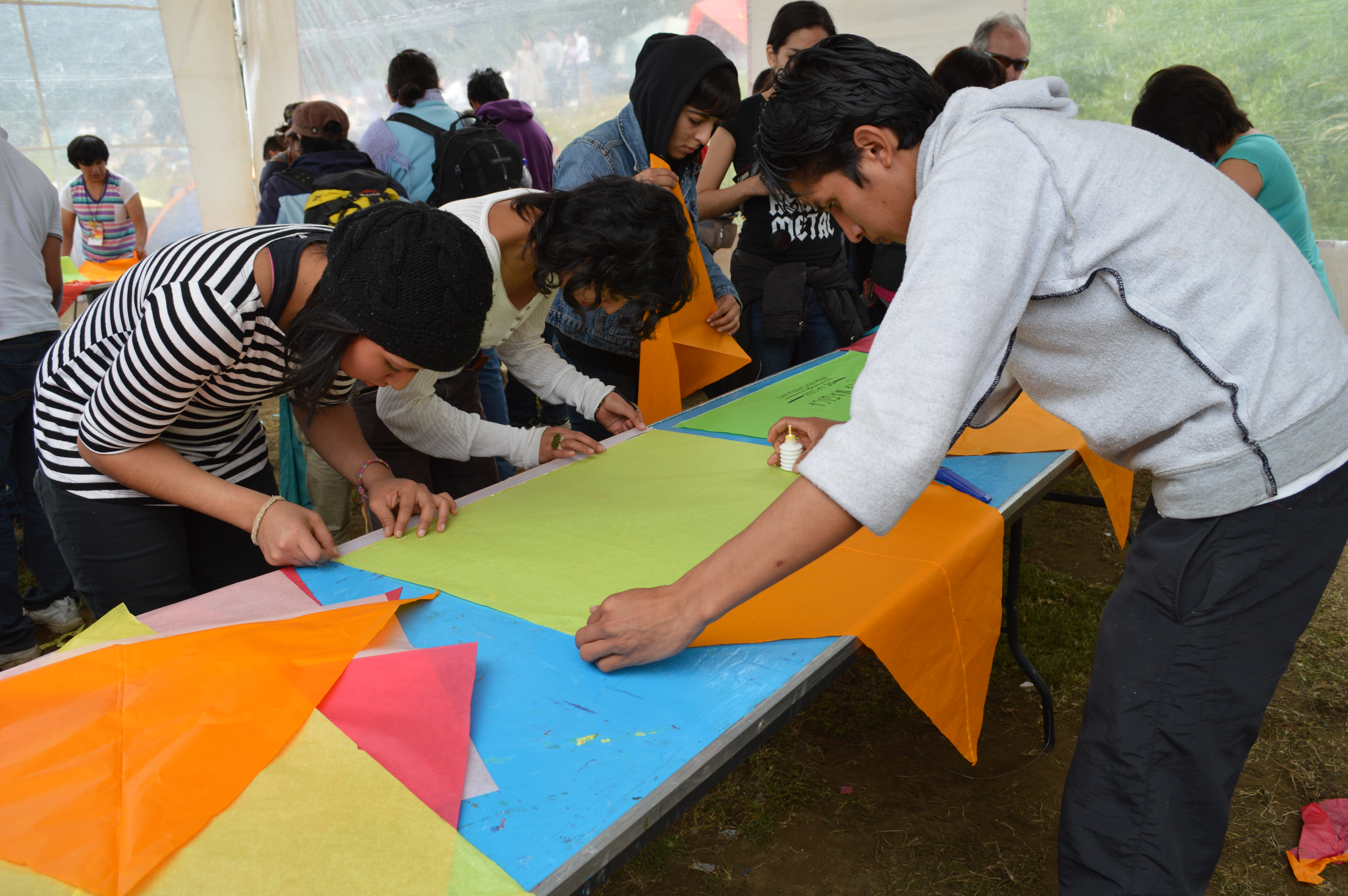
Making sky lanterns in Mexico

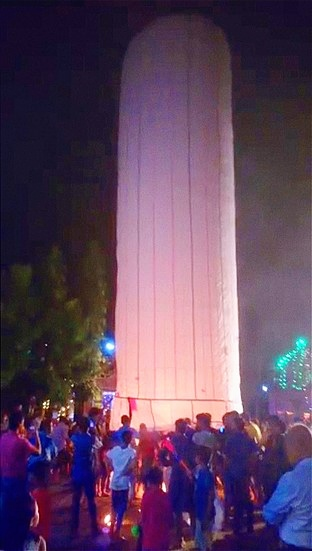
A very large sky lantern in Bandarban, Bangladesh

The general design is a thin paper shell, which may be from about 30 cm to a couple of metres across, with an opening at the bottom. The opening is usually about 10 to 30 cm wide (even for the largest shells), and is surrounded by a stiff collar that serves to suspend the flame source and to keep it away from the walls.

When lit, the flame heats the air inside the lantern, thus lowering its density and causing the lantern to rise into the air. The sky lantern is only airborne for as long as the flame stays alight, after which the lantern sinks back to the ground.

In China, Taiwan and Thailand, sky lanterns are traditionally made from oiled pith paper on a bamboo frame. The source of hot air may be a small candle or fuel cell composed of a waxy flammable material.

In Brazil and Mexico sky lanterns were traditionally made of several patches of thin translucent paper (locally called "silk paper"), in various bright colors, glued together to make a multicolored polyhedral shell. A design that was fairly common was two pyramids joined by the base (a bipyramid, such as the octahedron) sometimes with a cube or prism inserted in the middle. Only the smaller models had a full frame made of bamboo or thin wire; the slight overpressure of the hot air was sufficient to keep the larger ones inflated, and the frame was reduced to a wire loop around the bottom opening. The "candle" was usually a packet of paraffin or rosin tightly wrapped in cloth and bound with wire.

== History ==
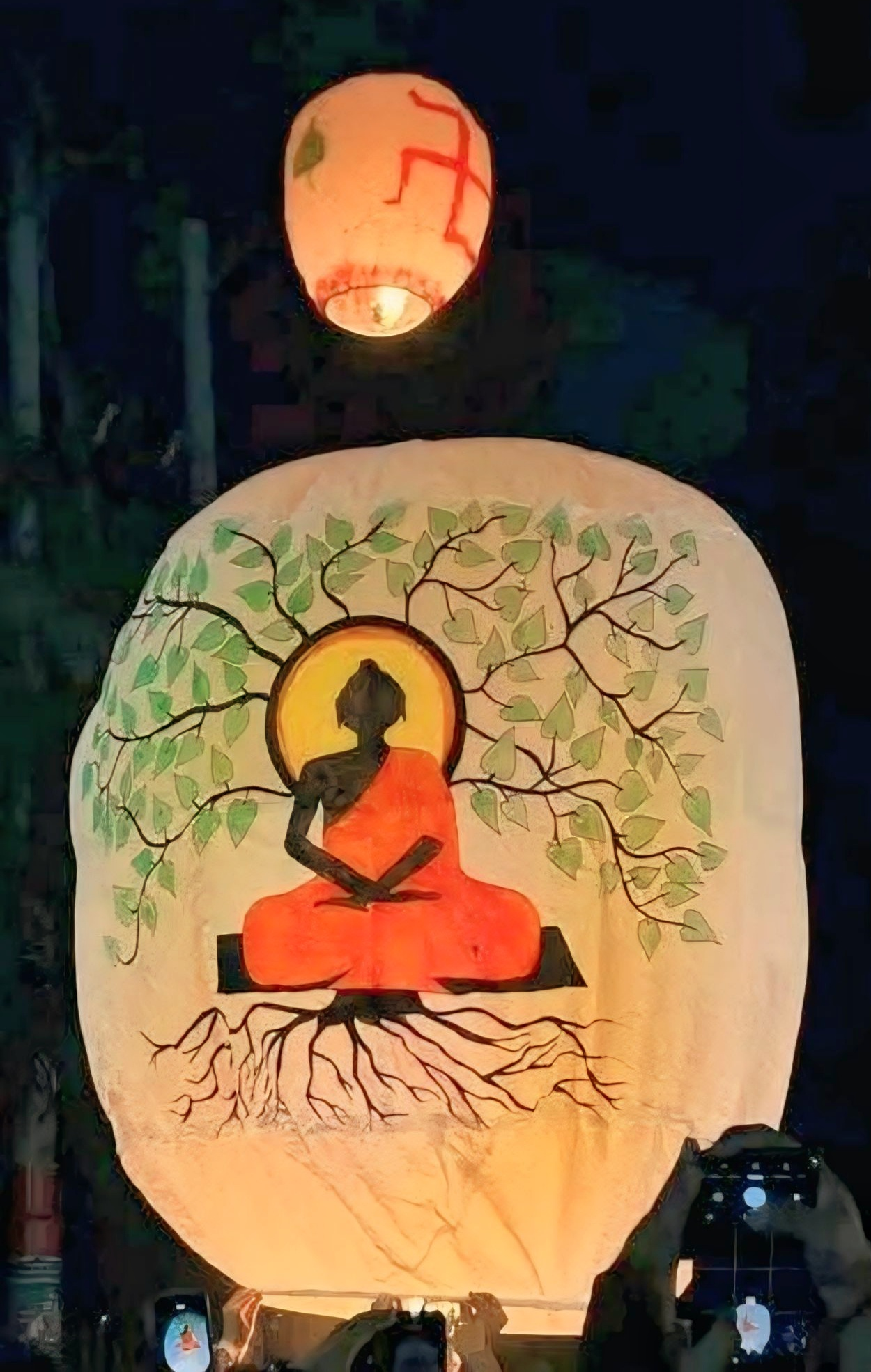
Art of The Buddha in lantern in Bangladesh

China is considered to have developed the first simple hot-air balloons. According to the sinologist and historian of science Joseph Needham, the Chinese experimented with small hot air balloons for signaling from as early as the 3rd century BC. Their invention is, however, traditionally attributed to the sage and military strategist Zhuge Liang (181–234 AD), whose reverent term of address was Kongming. He is said to have used a message written on a sky lantern to summon help on an occasion when he was surrounded by enemy troops. For this reason, they are still known in China as Kongming lanterns (孔明燈, 孔明灯, kǒngmíng dēng).

Another suggested origin is that the name actually comes from the lantern's resemblance to the hat Kongming is traditionally shown to be wearing.The Mongolian army studied Kongming lanterns from China and used them in the Battle of Legnica during the Mongol invasion of Poland. This is the first time ballooning was known in the western world.

In the history of military ballooning, the lanterns were also used for military signals, In the history of ballooning, these became the first hot air balloons used in the West, in Europe, during the Mongol Invasion of Poland. Sky lanterns could be a possible explanation for some UFO sightings through the years.

== Use in festivals ==
=== Bangladesh ===
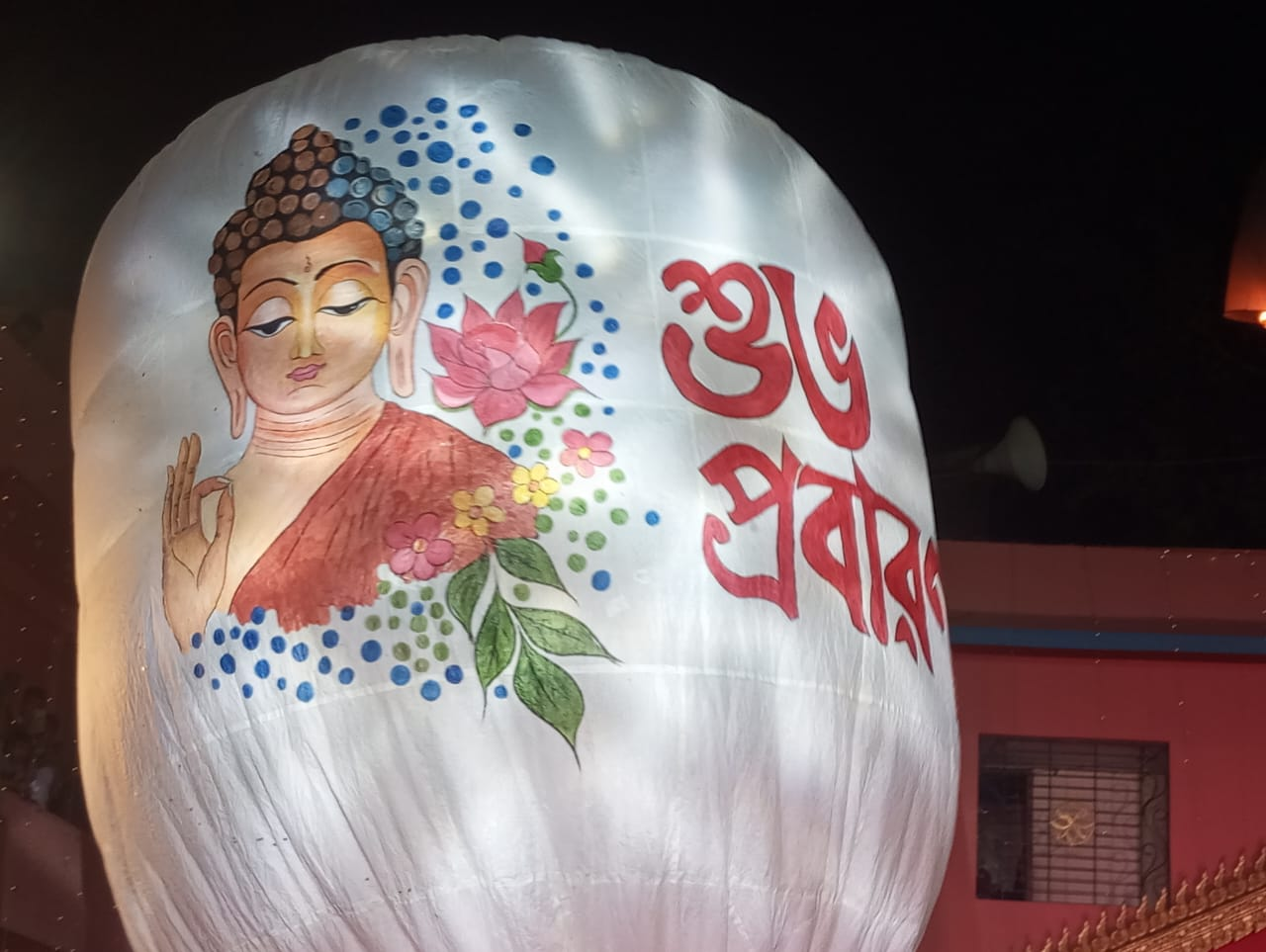
Sky lantern in Bangladesh

In Bangladesh, Probarona Purnima is observed by the Buddhist community as the most sacred festival marking the conclusion of the three-month rains retreat (Vassa). On this full-moon night, devotees perform religious observances, offer food to monks, and engage in charitable acts. One of the most distinctive features of the celebration is the release of sky lanterns, locally known as fanus. The practice symbolizes the victory of light over darkness and the attainment of wisdom over ignorance.

For many Buddhists, the rising lanterns represent spiritual offerings to the Buddha, prayers for peace, and goodwill for all beings. In the Chittagong region and the Chittagong Hill Tracts, hundreds of colorful lanterns are released into the night sky, illuminating the horizon and signifying unity, harmony, and spiritual renewal within the Buddhist community.

=== Mainland China ===
In ancient China, sky lanterns were strategically used in wars, in a similar way as kites were used in ancient Chinese warfare, such as military communication (transmitting secret messages), signaling, surveillance or spying, lighting the sky when laying siege on the city at night etc. However, later on, non-military applications were employed as they became popular with children at festivals. These lanterns were subsequently incorporated into festivals like the Chinese Mid-Autumn and Lantern Festivals.Although, nowadays they are used as objects within traditional festivals to emphasize the unity of family coming back together during the first full moon. This is represented by the lanterns all coming together in the sky upon being released and the roundness of the lanterns express the wholeness of family. Before Sky Lanterns were used in a cultural manner in their society, they were used as a means of communication in the military. However, with the passing of time, it shifted to symbolizing a family reunion. Hence, the importance of Sky Lanterns during the Mid-Autumn Festival and the Lantern Festival where they promote reconciliation, peace and forgiveness alongside the unity of family.

=== India ===
In Bengal and Northeast India, Buddhist people celebrate their Probarona Purnima which signifies the end of their three-month lent by releasing lighted sky lanterns (fanush), it is the second-largest festival of the Buddhist community. During Diwali festival (The festival of Light) eco-friendly sky lanterns are used for celebrations along with fireworks. It is a ritual of warding away bad energy and beginning a new (enlightened) path to righteousness.

=== Japan ===
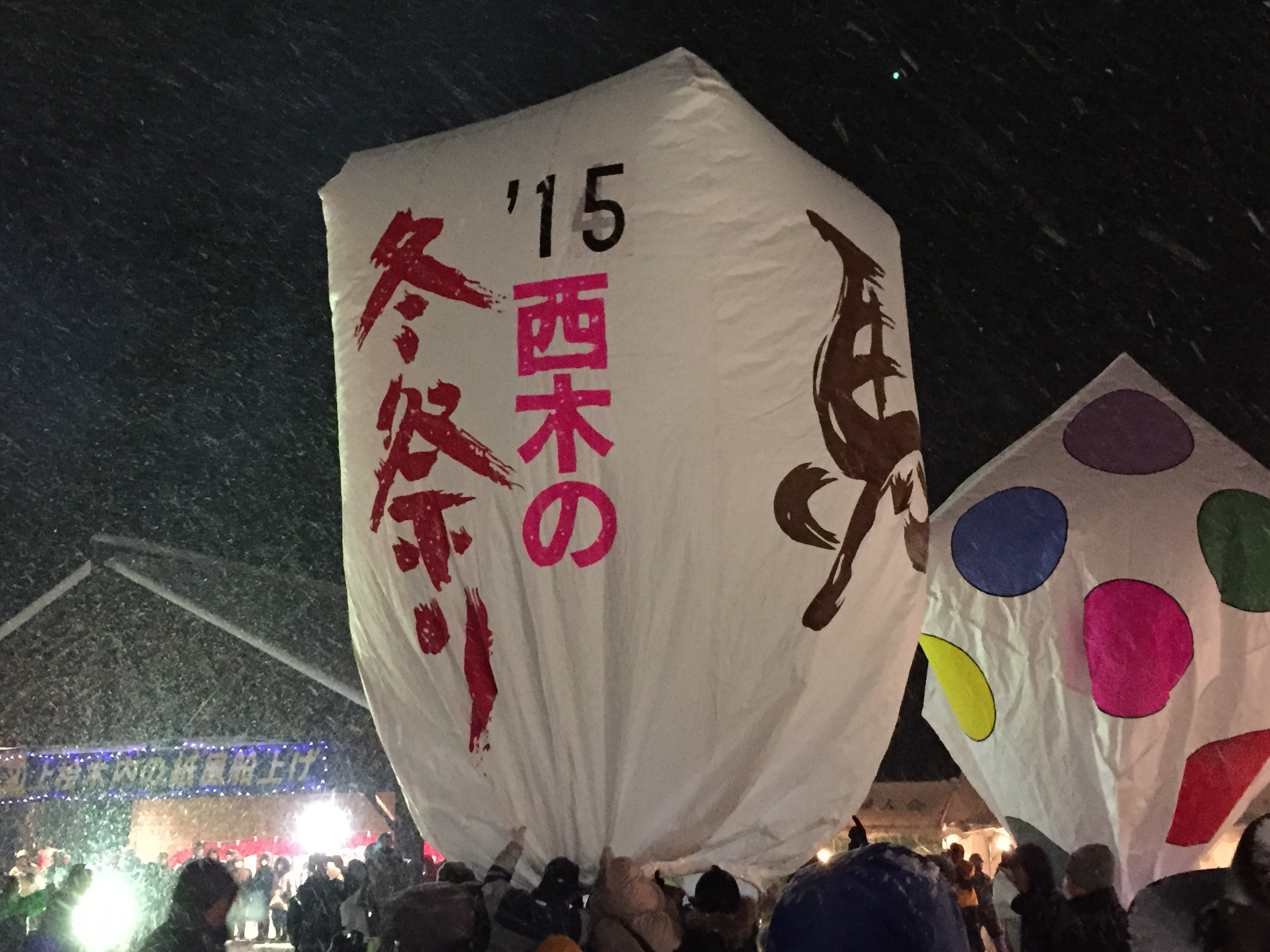
Hot-air kamifūsen in Kamihinokinai in 2015

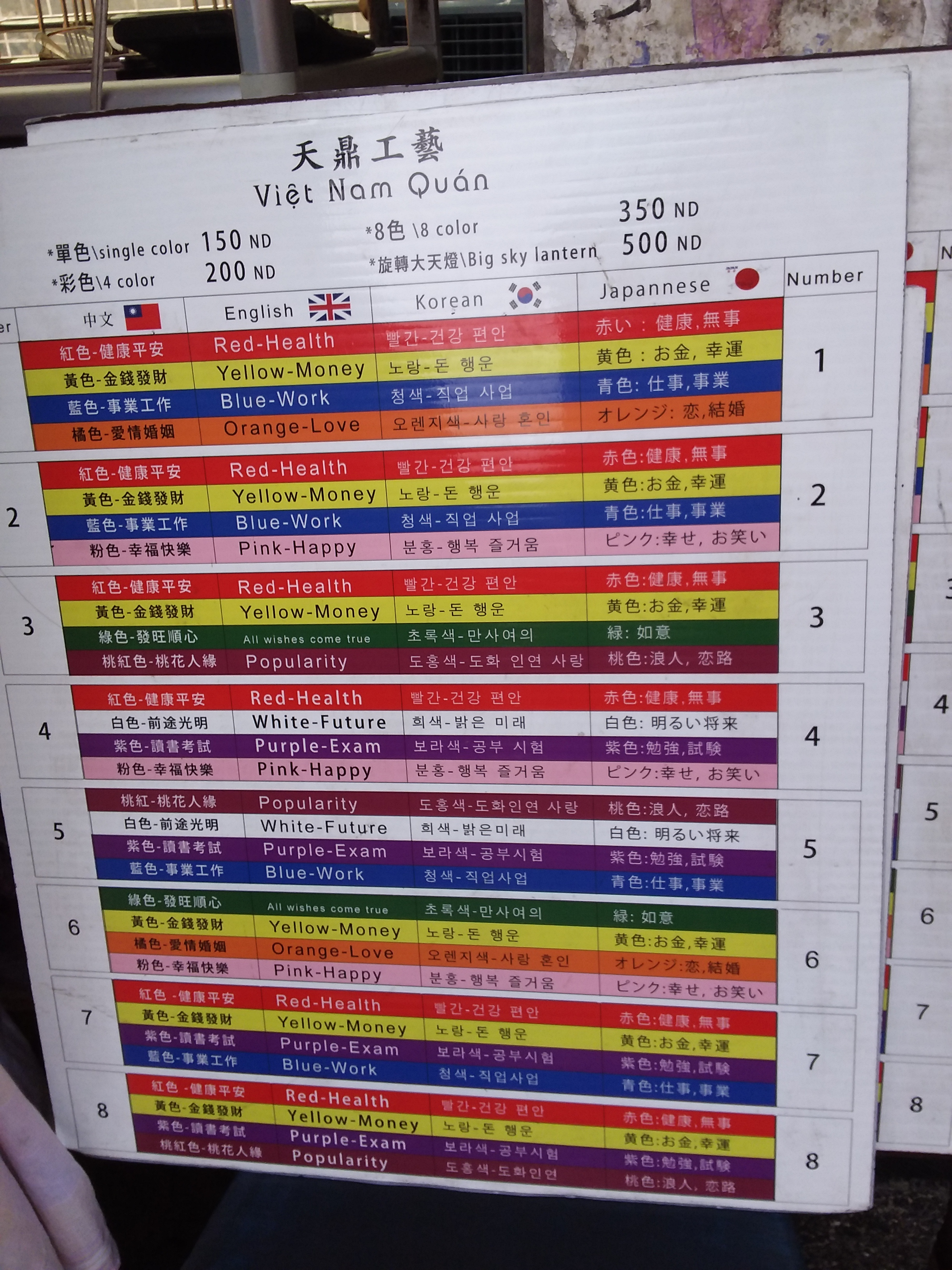
Different colors of sky lantern and their meanings in Taiwan

An annual sky lantern festival known as the Kamihinokinai Paper Balloon Festival (上桧木内の紙風船上げ) is held in Semboku, Akita, on February 10 each year. Hundreds of very large lanterns, known as kamifūsen (紙風船), are flown for good luck in the coming year. Lanterns are made of washi, traditional Japanese glassine paper. The festival has mythical origins, and was suspended during World War II. It was revived in 1974.

=== Portugal and Brazil ===
In Brazil, sky lanterns (balão in Portuguese) were a traditional feature of the winter holidays (Festas Juninas) at the end of June. It is claimed that custom was brought to Brazil from Portugal by colonists in the 16th century, and is still strong in Portugal, especially in Porto. The June holidays tradition also includes firecrackers and fireworks, another Chinese invention; so it is conjectured that these elements may have been brought from China by Portuguese explorers around 1500. The design and customs of Brazilian sky lanterns are modified to suit their festivals.

Bartolomeu de Gusmão, using a large-scale version of these lanterns, was the first man to fly a hot air balloon on 8 August 1709, in the hall of the Casa da Índia in Lisbon, Portugal, long before the Montgolfier brothers.

Brazilian sky lanterns are usually made by small groups of children and adolescents; but adults sometimes joined the effort, especially for the larger and more elaborate balloons. The launching of a large lantern, which could be one or two metres across, would usually require the cooperation of several people, to hold the balloon fully stretched until it was fully inflated. Lanterns with 20 metres or more and loaded with firecrackers and large flags are not uncommon.

Since 1998 launching lanterns has been an environmental crime in Brazil, punishable by up to 3 years in jail.

=== Taiwan ===
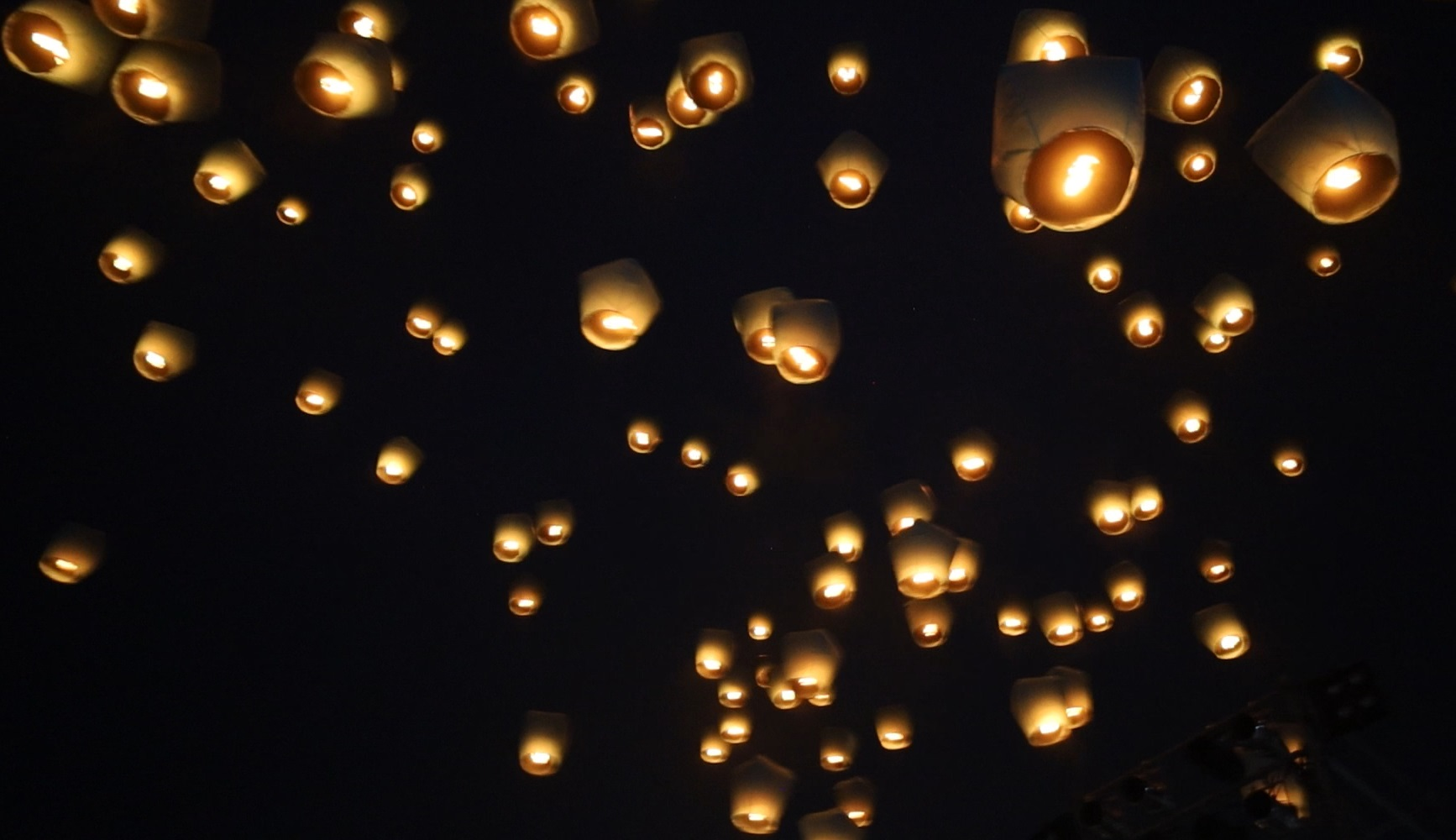
Pingxi Sky Lantern Festival

Pingxi District in New Taipei City of Taiwan holds an annual Sky Lantern Festival during which sky lanterns are released into the night sky with people's wishes written on them, to send the wishes and messages to God. The Sky Lantern Festival has traditionally been held on the 15th day of Chinese New Year, the last day of its celebration. Due to very popular demands and extreme congestions, the event is now spread over two days—on the 15th day of Chinese New Year and a week before that day. In 2024, the dates were February 17 and February 24. Sky lanterns are released in organized waves, sending over 1,000 of them into the heavens on each night of the event.

=== Thailand ===
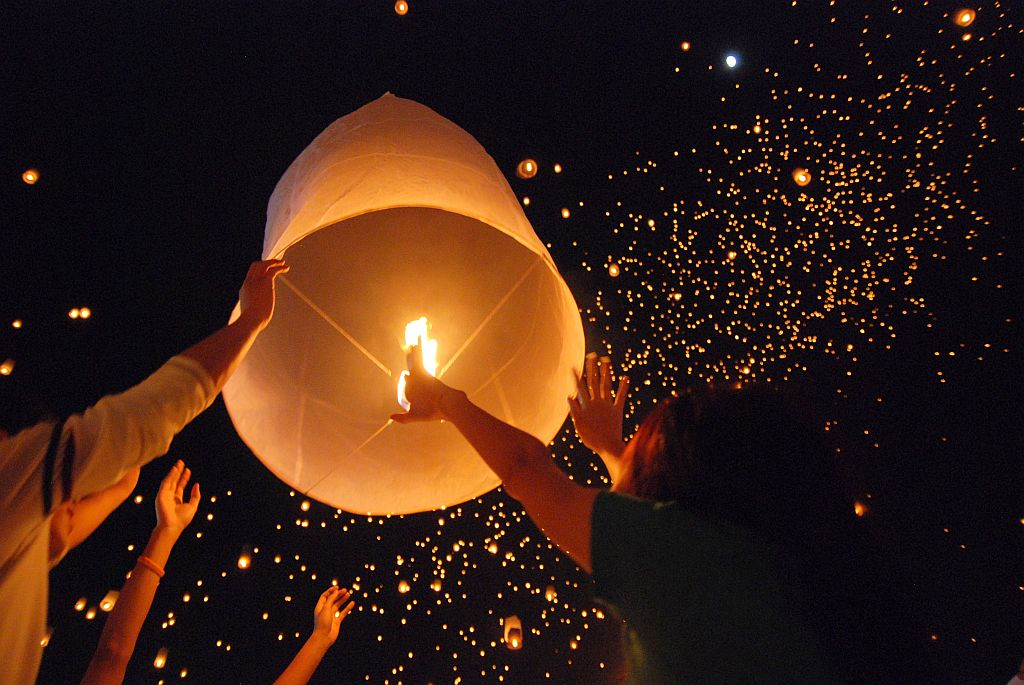
Release of a sky lantern during Yi Peng near Chiang Mai, Thailand

The Lanna people of northern Thailand use "floating lanterns" (โคมลอย, khom loi, [kʰōːm lɔ̄ːj]) year round, for celebrations and other special occasions. One very important festival in which sky lanterns are used is the Yi Peng festival, which is held on a full moon of the 2nd month (ยี่เป็ง, Yi Peng, [jîː pēŋ]) of the Lanna calendar (which coincides with Loi Krathong, the traditional festival on the 12th month of the Thai lunar calendar). During the Yi Peng festival, a multitude of lanterns are launched into the air where they resemble large flocks of giant fluorescent jellyfish gracefully floating by through the sky. The most elaborate Yi Peng celebrations can be seen in Chiang Mai, the ancient capital of the former Lanna kingdom. The festival is meant as a time to obtain Buddhist merit (ทำบุญ, tham bun). In recent times, floating lanterns have become so popular with all Thai people that they have become integrated into the festival in the rest of the country.

In addition, people will also decorate their houses, gardens and temples with intricately shaped paper lanterns (โคมไฟ, khom fai) of various forms. It is considered good luck to release a sky lantern, and many Thai people believe they are symbolic of problems and worries floating away.

== Dangers ==
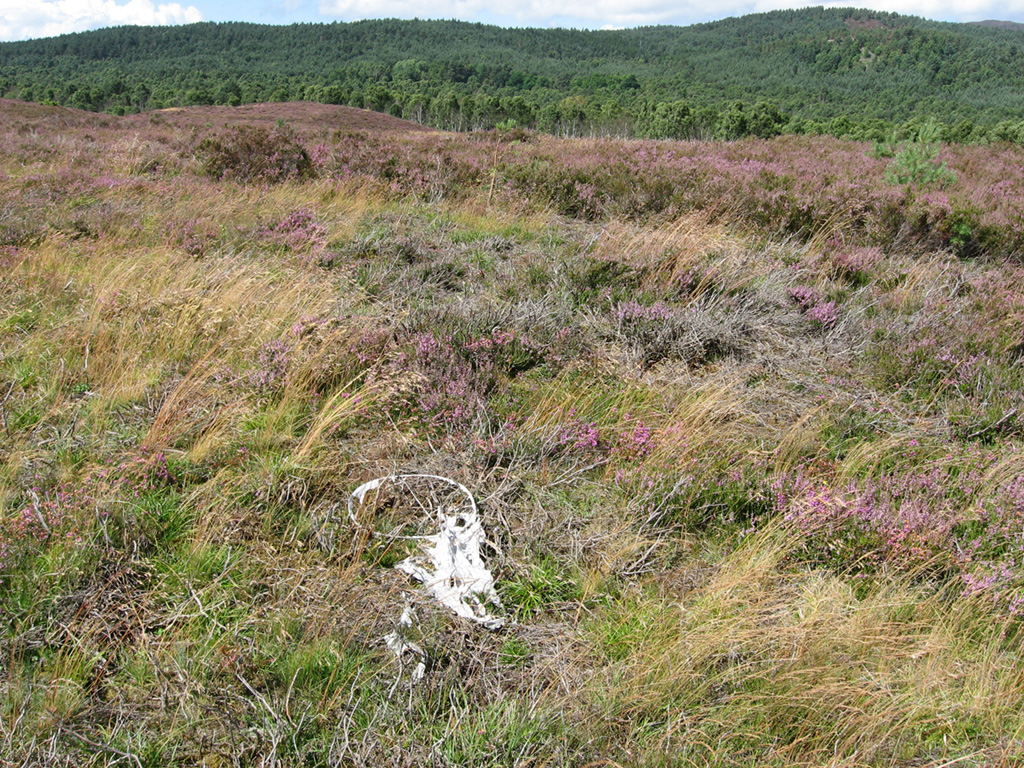
Sky lantern litter at Scottish Natural Heritage's Muir of Dinnet national nature reserve

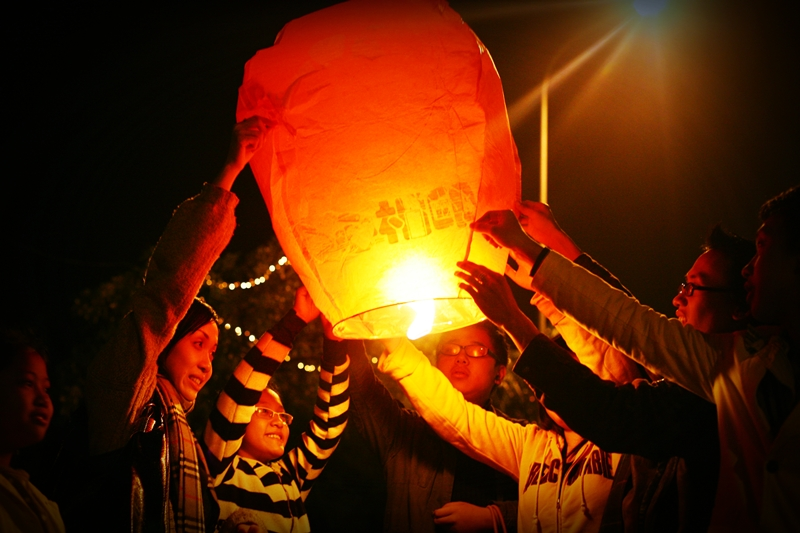
Released sky lanterns in Vietnam before being completely banned throughout the country in 2009 due to safety concerns

A sky lantern may land when the flame is still alight, making it a fire hazard. In typical designs, as long as the lantern stays upright the paper will not get hot enough to ignite, but if the balloon is tilted (say, by the wind or by hitting some object), it may catch fire while still in the air. All the paper will usually burn in a few seconds, but the flame source may remain lit until it hits the ground. After the balloon lands, the leftover thin wire frame will rust away very slowly, remaining a hazard to animals that may swallow it. Sky lanterns have also been alleged to pose a danger to aircraft. In 2009 British company Sky Orbs Chinese Lanterns developed lanterns using bio-degradable fireproof wool.

Early in 2009, a lantern set fire to a house in Siegen, North Rhine-Westphalia, Germany, resulting in the death of a ten-year-old boy. In July the same year, a lantern set fire to two houses in the German town of Dieburg, near Darmstadt.

On 1 July 2013 the 'largest fire ever' in the West Midlands of England, involving 100,000 tonnes of recycling material and causing an estimated £6 million worth of damage, was started by a sky lantern which landed at a plastics recycling plant in Smethwick. Images of the lantern starting the fire were captured on closed-circuit television. In response to the fire, Poundland, a national retail chain whose headquarters are in nearby Willenhall, decided to stop selling sky lanterns and recalled their entire stock on 6 July 2013.

In 2014 (as well as many other years) dozens of flights from Chiang Mai airport in Thailand had to be diverted or canceled when thousands of sky lanterns were released into the air.

In 2018 a pavilion at Riocentro Convention Center, near downtown Rio de Janeiro, Brazil, fully burned after a sky balloon landed on its roof.

In the early hours of 1 January 2020, more than 30 animals, primarily apes and monkeys, were killed at Krefeld Zoo in Germany in a fire believed to have been caused by sky lanterns used in New Year's celebrations. Many of the species involved are endangered in the wild.

=== Legal status ===
There has been growing concern by some about the potential danger to cause crop or building fires and even harm animals that may eat their remains. Some places have banned them for these reasons.

The city of Sanya in China banned sky lanterns as hazardous towards aircraft and airspace navigation.

In 1936 sky lanterns were made illegal in the Gau Thuringia, Germany, based on the Landespolizeiverordnung über Papierballons mit Brennstoffantrieb vom 30. November 1936 (State police regulation on fuel powered paper balloons of 30 November 1936). The regulation prohibited the manufacturing, distribution and launch of paper balloons powered by fuel or candles. Violations were punishable by a fine of up to 150 ℛ︁ℳ︁ or imprisonment of up to two weeks.

Since 2009 it has been illegal to launch a sky lantern in most parts of Germany, with fines of up to 5000 euros being possible; in some German states, local authorities may give special permission on application. In Austria, it is illegal to produce, sell, import, or distribute them. In Argentina, Chile, and Colombia it is illegal to launch lanterns, as well as in Spain and Vietnam. In Brazil launching lanterns is an environmental crime, punishable by up to three years in jail since 1998.

Retail sale (but not possession and use) of sky lanterns that "rely on an open flame to heat the air inside the lantern" was banned in Australia on 1 February 2011.

Sky lanterns have also been banned since 20 June 2013 in Kittitas County, Washington, in the United States, because of fire concerns. In 2015, Washington state later banned their use statewide, with the adoption of the 2015 International Fire Code.

In Louisiana, the state fire marshal issued a ban on the distribution, sale, and use of sky lanterns in the state in 2013.

In the UK, Ruth George, then Labour MP for High Peak, introduced a Ten Minute Rule bill calling for the banning of sky lanterns in the House of Commons on 27 March 2019, but it did not ultimately pass into law.

== See also ==
- Pavāraṇā
- Hot air balloon
- Incendiary balloon
- Kamifūsen
- Lantern
- Paper lantern
- Tangled (2010 animated film that uses Asian-style sky lanterns in a pseudo-European/fairy-tale setting)
- Unidentified flying object
