= Samuel Page (footballer) =

English footballer

Personal information
- Place of birth: Blackheath, Rowley Regis, England
- Height: 6 ft 1 in (1.85 m)
- Position: Goalkeeper

Senior career*
Years	Team	Apps	(Gls)
	Halesowen Town	?	(?)
1923–1925	Burnley	12	(0)
	St Johnstone	?	(?)
	St Mirren	?	(?)
	Halesowen Town	?	(?)
- * Club domestic league appearances and goals

Samuel Page was an English professional footballer who played as a goalkeeper.
