= Samuel Page (poet) =

English clergyman & poet (1574–1630)

Samuel Page (1574–1630) was an English clergyman and poet.

== Life ==
A native of Bedfordshire, he was the son of a clergyman. He was admitted scholar of Christ Church, Oxford, 10 June 1587, and matriculated on 1 July 1587, aged 13. He graduated B.A. on 5 February 1591, and on 16 April of the same year became fellow. He proceeded M.A. 15 March 1594, B.D. 12 March 1604, and D.D. 6 June 1611. 'In his juvenile years he was accounted,' according to Francis Meres, ‘one of the chiefest among our English poets to bewail and bemoan the perplexities of love in his poetical and romantic writings.’

After taking holy orders, he served as a naval chaplain and joined the expedition to Cádiz in 1595 as chaplain to the admiral, Charles Howard, 1st Earl of Nottingham. In 1597 he became vicar of St Nicholas, Deptford. He held the living with his chaplaincy.

He died at Deptford and was buried in his church on 8 August 1630.

== Works ==
Page's poetical works comprised a poem prefixed to Coryat's Crudities (1611), and The Love of Amos and Laura, by S. P., which appeared in the miscellaneous collection of verse entitled Alcilia (London, 1613); this edition was reprinted by Alexander Balloch Grosart in 1879. In the second edition (London, 1619), Page's work had a separate title-page, and to it were prefixed two six-line stanzas addressed ‘to my approved and much respected friend Iz[aak] Wa[lton].’ In the third edition, published in London in 1628, these lines are replaced by six addressed by ‘the author to his book’.

Page also published sermons and religious tracts. Among the most significant are:

- ‘A Sermon preached at the Death of Sir Richard Leveson, Vice-admiral of England,’ London, 1605; reprinted in Samuel Egerton Brydges's ‘Restituta,’ ii. 226–37.
- ‘The Cape of Good Hope: Five Sermons for the use of the Merchant and Mariner. Preached to the Worshipful Company of the Brethren of the Trinitie House; and now published for the general Benefit of all Sea Men,’ London, 1616. The first sermon is dedicated to Sir Thomas Smith, governor of the East India Company.
- ‘God be thanked: a Sermon of Thanksgiving for the Happy Successe of the Englishe Fleetes sent forth by the Honorable Company of Adventurers to the East Indies. Preached to the Honourable Governor and Committees, and the whole Company of their good Ship the Hope Merchant, happily returned at Deptford on Maundy Thursday, 29 March 1616,’ London, 1616.
- ‘The Allegiance of the Cleargie: a Sermon preached at the Meeting of the whole Clergie of the Dyocese of Rochester, to take the Oath of Allegiance to his most Excellent Majesty at Greenewich, Novemb. 2, 1610,’ London, 1616; dedicated to the bishop of London.
- ‘The Supper of the Lord: a Sermon preached at Hampton, Sept. 10, 1615,’ London, 1616; dedicated to Lady Anne Howard of Effingham.
- ‘The Remedy of Drought,’ two sermons, the first preached at Deptford 30 July 1615, the second sermon, ‘A Thanksgiving for Rain,’ London, 1616. Dedicated to ‘my honoured friend, Sir John Scott, knt.’
- ‘A Manual of Private Devotions,’ edited by Nicholas Snape of Gray's Inn, 1631.
- ‘A Godly and learned Exposition on the Lords Prayer written by Samuel Page, &c., published since his Death by Nathaniel Snape of Grays Inne, Esq.,’ London, 1631; dedicated to Thomas Coventry, 1st Baron Coventry.

Robert Watt also ascribes to Page ‘Meditations on the Tenth Psalm,’ London, 1639.
