= Smethwick by-election =

Smethwick by-election may refer to one of two by-elections to the British House of Commons in the Smethwick constituency in the West Midlands:

- 1926 Smethwick by-election
- 1945 Smethwick by-election

See also

- Smethwick (UK Parliament constituency)
- Smethwick in the 1964 general election
