= 1919 Leyton West by-election =

UK parliamentary by-election

- 1 March 1919 (Polling); 14 March 1919 (Declaration)
- Registered: 32,567
- Turnout: 42.5%
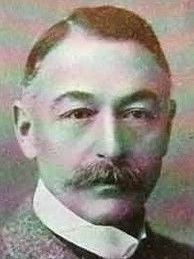
	Lib
Candidate	Alfred Newbould	James Mason
Party	Liberal	Unionist
Alliance		Coalition
Popular vote	7,934	5,915
Percentage	57.3%	42.7%
Swing	▲24.7%	▼24.7%
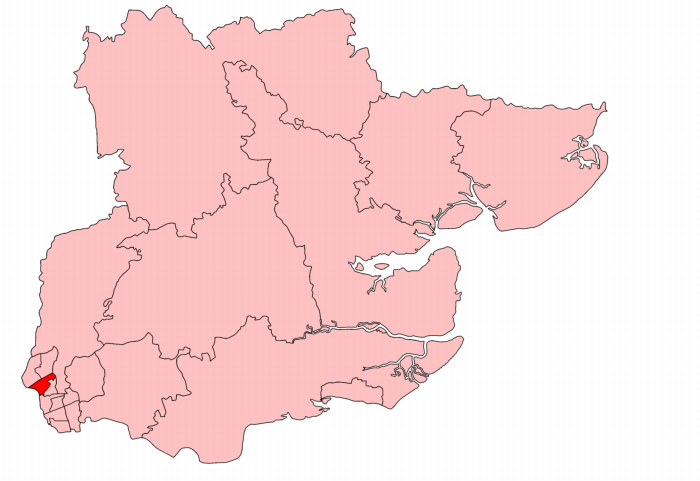
MP before election
Harry Wrightson
Unionist
Subsequent MP
Alfred Newbould
Liberal

The 1919 Leyton West by-election was a parliamentary by-election held on 1 March 1919 for the British House of Commons constituency of Leyton West, in the Urban District of Leyton, Essex. The constituency formed part of the Greater London conurbation.

== Background ==
The seat had become vacant on the death of the constituency's Unionist Member of Parliament (MP), Harry Wrightson on 11 February 1919. Wrightson had first been elected at the 1918 general election. Within days of the declaration of poll however, Wrightson contracted influenza, which deteriorated to pneumonia, and he died early in 1919, aged 44, six days before the new Parliament met and so was never able to take his seat.

=== Electoral history ===
1918 general election: Leyton West
Party		Candidate	Votes	%
C	Unionist	Harry Wrightson	10,956	67.4
	Liberal	Alfred Newbould	5,288	32.6
Majority			5,668	34.8
Turnout			16,244	49.9
Registered electors			32,567	
	Unionist win (new seat)			
C indicates candidate endorsed by the coalition government.

== Candidates ==
=== Unionist ===
- James Mason, director of the Great Western Railway and former member for Windsor (1906–1918).

=== Liberal ===
- Alfred Newbould, cinematographer and candidate for this seat in 1918

== Campaign ==
Mason's campaign sought to repeat the theme of the previous General Election, where Unionists had run solely on the glory of having won the war. Newbould's main campaign points were the abolition of conscription and a crackdown on profiteering the first policy was said to appeal to men and the second to women. Unfortunately for part of the contest he was confined to bed with a bad cold and his wife was engaged as principal canvasser on his behalf.

== Result ==
On a turnout of 42.5%, (down from the general election turnout of 49.9%) Newbould won what was seen as an important victory for the Asquithian Liberals improving his share of the vote from 32.6% at the general election to 57.3% in the by-election.

Leyton West by-election, 1919
Party		Candidate	Votes	%	±%
	Liberal	Alfred Newbould	7,934	57.3	+24.7
C	Unionist	James Mason	5,915	42.7	–24.7
Majority			2,019	14.6	N/A
Turnout			13,849	42.5	–7.4
Registered electors			32,567		±0
	Liberal gain from Unionist		Swing	+24.7	
C indicates candidate endorsed by the coalition government.

According to psephologist John Ramsden, this amounted to a swing of 24.8% and was statistically one of the worst by-election reverses of the 1918–1922 government.

== Aftermath ==
At the 1922 general election, Newbould lost the seat back to the Unionists, and never got back into the House.

== See also ==
- List of United Kingdom by-elections
- Leyton West constituency
