= Reginald Sorensen, Baron Sorensen =

British politician (1891–1971)

The Right Honourable The Lord Sorensen

Member of Parliament for Leyton Leyton West (1929-1931, 1935-1950)
- In office 14 November 1935 – 15 December 1964
- Preceded by: Wilfrid Sugden
- Succeeded by: Ronald Buxton
- In office 30 May 1929 – 7 October 1931
- Preceded by: James Cassels
- Succeeded by: Wilfrid Sugden

Personal details
- Born: 19 June 1891 Islington, London, England
- Died: 8 October 1971 (aged 80) Leytonstone, London, England
- Party: Labour

Reginald William Sorensen, Baron Sorensen (19 June 1891 – 8 October 1971) was a Unitarian minister and Labour Party politician in the United Kingdom. He was a Member of Parliament (MP) for over 30 years, from 1929 to 1931 and again from 1935 to 1964, when he was raised to the peerage.

== Early life ==
Sorensen was born in Islington, north London, on 19 June 1891. He was his parents' first born child and had two brothers and two sisters. Sorensen's father, William James Sorensen (1868–1925), was a silversmith of Danish paternity. Sorensen's mother, Alice Jemima (died 1934), was the daughter of a fisherman from Worthing, Sussex.

After leaving school at the age of fourteen, Sorensen worked as an errand-boy, in a factory as a manual worker, and later in a shop.

== Political career ==
During the First World War, Sorensen was exempt from military service due to being a religious minister, but declared himself a pacifist.

Between 1921 and 1924, Sorensen served as a member of the Walthamstow Urban District Council. Sorensen served as the chair of the education committee. In 1924 Sorensen was elected an Essex county councillor. Sorensen remained in this role until 1945.

At the 1923 general election, he was an unsuccessful candidate in Southampton, coming fourth in the two-seat constituency. He stood again in the 1934 Lowestoft by-election, losing by 1,920 votes to the Conservative candidate, Pierse Loftus.

Sorensen was elected as MP for Leyton West at the 1929 general election, defeating the sitting Conservative MP James Cassels by a majority of 2,153. When Labour split at the 1931 general election, Sir Wilfrid Sugden retook the seat for the Conservatives with a majority of nearly 10,000. Sorenson was also Essex County Councillor for the Leyton Lea Bridge division whilst an MP.

At the Labour Party Congress in Hastings in 1933, Sorensen emerged as a major critic of the harsh means by which the British rulers were striving to maintain their empire in India. 'The operation of Imperialism in India is in essence no different from the operations of Hitlerism,' he told the conference. 'We are appalled by what is happening to the Jews in Germany, but what has been happening in India is just as bad.' Sorensen served as chair of the Fabian Colonial Bureau and the India League, which supported Indian nationalism. In 1946 Sorensen formed part of a parliamentary deputation to India and he welcomed Indian independence the following year.

Sorensen narrowly regained the seat at the 1935 election, and represented the constituency until it was abolished in 1950. At the 1950 general election, he was returned to Parliament for the new Leyton constituency.

Sorensen was a committed pacifist and in 1936 he joined the Peace Pledge union. However, following the outbreak of World War II, while expressing disappointment at the failure of the peace movement to prevent war and being a member of the generally anti war Parliamentary Peace Aims Group, he urged his fellow pacifists "not to obstruct the war effort".

A noted secularist, he became an Appointed Lecturer at the South Place Ethical Society in the 1960s.

At the 1964 general election, he was re-elected for a seventh term in the House of Commons. Shortly afterwards, on 15 December 1964, he was created a life peer, as Baron Sorensen, of Leyton in the County of Essex. In 1966 Sorensen proposed the abolition of the House of Lords in favour of a senate of experts in administration. He then served until 1968 as a Lord-in-waiting in the House of Lords. Speaking in 1971, Sorensen suggested that the Government should 'positively encourage sterilisation, here and elsewhere, of those who are physically or mentally unfit' in order to stabilise the world's population.

He had been offered the peerage to make a vacancy for the Foreign Secretary, Patrick Gordon Walker, who had been defeated in his Smethwick constituency. However, the by-election in January 1965 was won by the Conservative Ronald Buxton.

== Personal life ==
On 22 January 1916 Sorensen married Muriel (b. 1891). Sorensen's father-in-law was the Revd William Harvey-Smith, a Unitarian minister from Lincolnshire - she was sister to Lilla, a fellow pacifist. Sorensen and his wife had a daughter and two sons.

Sorensen died on 8 October 1971 at Whipps Cross Hospital, Leytonstone. He was cremated several days later at the City of London cemetery.

== Notes ==
Parliament of the United Kingdom
Preceded by James Cassels	Member of Parliament for Leyton West; 1929–1931	Succeeded by Sir Wilfrid Sugden
Preceded by Sir Wilfrid Sugden	Member of Parliament for Leyton West; 1935–1950	Constituency abolished
New constituency	Member of Parliament for Leyton; 1950–1964	Succeeded by Ronald Buxton
Political offices
Preceded by New government	Lord-in-waiting; 1964–1968	Succeeded by The Baroness Serota
