= Ronald Buxton =

Ronald Buxton may refer to:

- Ronald Buxton (British politician) (1923–2017), Conservative Member of Parliament for Leyton, 1965–1966
- Ron Buxton (1949–2021), Democratic Party Member of the Pennsylvania House of Representatives, 1993–2012
