= Leyton (electoral division) =

Electoral division in Greater London, 1973–1986

- Former electoral division for the Greater London Council
- Leyton electoral division boundaries
- District: Waltham Forest
- Electorate: 64,685 (1973); 61,268 (1977); 58,702 (1981)
- Major settlements: Leyton
- Area: 1,050 hectares (10.5 km^{2})

Former electoral division
- Created: 1973
- Abolished: 1986
- Member: 1
- Created from: Waltham Forest

Leyton was an electoral division for the purposes of elections to the Greater London Council. The constituency elected one councillor for a four-year term in 1973, 1977 and 1981, with the final term extended for an extra year ahead of the abolition of the Greater London Council.

== History ==
It was planned to use the same boundaries as the Westminster Parliament constituencies for election of councillors to the Greater London Council (GLC), as had been the practice for elections to the predecessor London County Council, but those that existed in 1965 crossed the Greater London boundary. Until new constituencies could be settled, the 32 London boroughs were used as electoral areas. The London Borough of Waltham Forest formed the Waltham Forest electoral division. This was used for the Greater London Council elections in 1964, 1967 and 1970.

The new constituencies were settled following the Second Periodic Review of Westminster constituencies and the new electoral division matched the boundaries of the Leyton parliamentary constituency.

It covered an area of 1,050 hectares (10.5 km^{2}).

== Elections ==
The Leyton constituency was used for the Greater London Council elections in 1973, 1977 and 1981. One councillor was elected at each election using first-past-the-post voting.

=== 1973 election ===
The fourth election to the GLC (and first using revised boundaries) was held on 12 April 1973. The electorate was 64,685 and one Labour Party councillor was elected. The turnout was 28.4%. The councillor was elected for a three-year term. This was extended for an extra year in 1976 when the electoral cycle was switched to four-yearly.

1973 Greater London Council election: Leyton
Party	Candidate	Votes	%	±%
Labour	John James Walsh	11,240	61.21	
Conservative	G. P. A. Waller	6,485	35.31	
Communist	John Arthur Courcouf	646	3.52	
Turnout				
Labour win (new seat)				

=== 1977 election ===
The fifth election to the GLC (and second using revised boundaries) was held on 5 May 1977. The electorate was 61,268 and one Conservative Party councillor was elected. The turnout was 37.3%. The councillor was elected for a four-year term.

1977 Greater London Council election: Leyton
Party	Candidate	Votes	%	±%
Conservative	Waldemar Thor Neilson-Hansen	9,577	41.87	
Labour	John James Walsh	9,386	41.04	
National Front	N. A. Lyons	2,386	10.44	
Liberal	John G Williams	1,171	5.12	
Communist	John Arthur Courcouf	340	1.49	
Turnout				
Conservative gain from Labour		Swing		

=== 1981 election ===
The sixth and final election to the GLC (and third using revised boundaries) was held on 7 May 1981. The electorate was 58,702 and one Labour Party councillor was elected. The turnout was 39.2%. The councillor was elected for a four-year term, extended by an extra year by the Local Government (Interim Provisions) Act 1984, ahead of the abolition of the council.

1981 Greater London Council election: Leyton
Party	Candidate	Votes	%	±%
Labour	Peter John Dawe	12,953	56.28	
Conservative	Waldemar Thor Neilson-Hansen	6,008	26.10	
Liberal	Robert F. Sullivan	3,071	13.35	
National Front	Colin R. Coward	734	3.19	
Communist	John Arthur Courcouf	242	1.05	
Turnout				
Labour gain from Conservative		Swing		
