= Leyton and Wanstead =

UK Parliament constituency (since 1997)

Coordinates: 51.571°N 0.013°E

- Borough constituency for the House of Commons
- Interactive map of boundaries from 2024
- Location within Greater London
- County: Greater London
- Electorate: 71,330 (March 2020)

Current constituency
- Created: 1997
- Member of Parliament: Calvin Bailey (Labour Party)
- Seats: One
- Created from: Leyton, Wanstead & Woodford

Leyton and Wanstead is a constituency (Note: A borough constituency (for the purposes of election expenses and type of returning officer).) in Greater London created in 1997 and represented in the House of Commons of the UK Parliament since 2024 by Calvin Bailey of the Labour Party. (Note: As with all constituencies, the constituency elects one Member of Parliament (MP) by the first past the post system of election at least every five years.)

== Constituency profile ==
Leyton and Wanstead is an urban and suburban constituency in the boroughs of Redbridge and Waltham Forest in Greater London, located around 7 miles (11 km) north-east of the centre of London. It covers the neighbourhoods of Leyton, Wanstead, Leytonstone, Cann Hall, Aldersbrook and South Woodford. Like much of outer London, the area was rapidly developed in the late 19th and early 20th centuries with Victorian and Edwardian terraced housing. It is served by the London Underground's Central line. The constituency has average levels of wealth; there is some deprivation in Leyton and Cann Hall, which are densely-populated, whilst Wanstead is suburban and affluent. The average house price is lower than the London average but considerably higher than the rest of the country.

In general, residents of Leyton and Wanstead are young and well-educated. Rates of homeownership, income and professional employment are similar to the rest of London. A high proportion of residents work in the health and retail sectors. The percentage of people claiming unemployment benefits is higher than the rest of London and the rest of the country. White people made up 52% of the population at the 2021 census, around two-fifths of whom were of non-British origin including large Romanian and Bulgarian populations. Asians were 23% of residents with Pakistanis being the largest Asian group, and Black people were 13%. At the local borough council level, all seats in the constituency are represented by Labour Party councillors. Voters in the constituency strongly supported remaining in the European Union in the 2016 referendum; an estimated 65% voted to remain compared to the nationwide figure of 48%.

== History ==
The seat arose from the enacting of the recommendations of the fourth periodic review of Westminster constituencies of the Boundary Commission for England to take account of demographic population change and seek to equalise electorates whilst in preference retaining the historic connections with the local authorities of the United Kingdom.

Political history

The constituency has consistently elected Labour Party MPs (Members of Parliament); the narrowest winning majority was 16%; the greatest, 49%, in 2017. Harry Cohen was MP for the Leyton area from 1983 and this seat from 1997. Cohen retired before the 2010 election, after which the seat was retained by John Cryer. (Note: Previously MP for Hornchurch (1997 to 2005).) At the time of the 2015 result, the seat was the 46th safest of Labour's 232 seats by percentage of majority.

== Boundaries ==
Map of boundaries 1997–2024

Uniting for general elections areas from the boroughs of Redbridge and Waltham Forest in inner north-east London, the constituency covers Leyton, Wanstead & Leytonstone. The seat was created for the 1997 election succeeding the Leyton constituency, with parts of what had been the formerly safe Conservative Wanstead and Woodford constituency.

=== 1997–2024 ===
The London Borough of Redbridge wards of Snaresbrook and Wanstead; and the London Borough of Waltham Forest wards of Cann Hall, Cathall, Forest, Grove Green, Leyton, and Leytonstone.

Following a review of ward boundaries which became effective in May 2017, the parts in the London Borough of Redbridge comprised the Wanstead Village ward, most of the Wanstead Park ward and part of the South Woodford ward.

=== Current ===
Further to the 2023 review of Westminster constituencies and taking account of a local government boundary review in Waltham Forest in May 2022, the constituency comprises the following from the 2024 general election:

- The London Borough of Redbridge wards of South Woodford, Wanstead Park, and Wanstead Village; and
- The London Borough of Waltham Forest wards of Cann Hall, Cathall, Forest, Grove Green, Hoe Street (small part), Leyton (most), and Leytonstone.

In Redbridge Borough, the constituency was expanded to include the remainder of the Wanstead Park and South Woodford wards. The boundaries within Waltham Forest Borough were unchanged.

== Members of Parliament ==
Election	Member	Party
1997	Harry Cohen	Labour
2010	John Cryer	Labour
2024	Calvin Bailey	Labour

== Elections ==
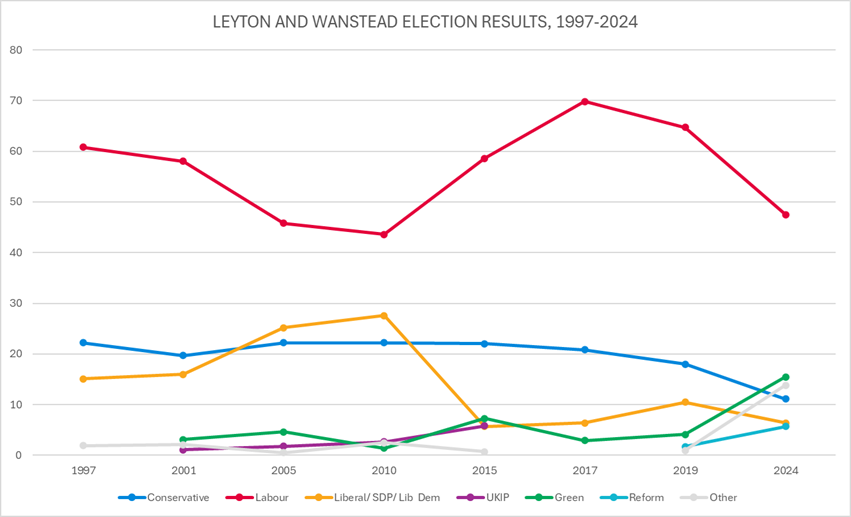
Election results 1997-2024

=== Elections in the 2020s ===
General election 2024: Leyton and Wanstead
Party	Candidate	Votes	%	±%
Labour	Calvin Bailey	20,755	47.5	−15.6
Green	Charlotte Lafferty	6,791	15.5	+11.7
Conservative	Gloria Croxall	4,846	11.1	−8.8
Independent	Shanell Johnson	4,173	9.5	N/A
Liberal Democrats	Tara Copeland	2,815	6.4	−4.3
Reform	David Sandground	2,475	5.7	+4.0
Workers Party	Mahtab Anwar Aziz	1,633	3.7	N/A
Rejoin EU	Simon Bezer	244	0.6	N/A
Majority		13,964	32.0	−16.7
Turnout		43,732	59.6	–8.9
Registered electors		73,366		
Labour hold		Swing	−13.7	

=== Elections in the 2010s ===
2019 notional result
Party	Vote	%
Labour	30,823	63.1
Conservative	9,702	19.9
Liberal Democrats	5,209	10.7
Green	1,868	3.8
Brexit Party	836	1.7
Others	427	0.9
Turnout	48,865	68.5
Electorate	71,330	

General election 2019: Leyton and Wanstead
Party	Candidate	Votes	%	±%
Labour	John Cryer	28,836	64.7	–5.1
Conservative	Noshaba Khiljee	8,028	18.0	–2.8
Liberal Democrats	Ben Sims	4,666	10.5	+4.1
Green	Ashley Gunstock	1,805	4.1	+1.2
Brexit Party	Zulf Jannaty	785	1.7	N/A
Independent	Henry Scott	427	1.0	N/A
Majority		20,808	46.7	–2.3
Turnout		44,547	68.7	–2.2
Registered electors		64,852		
Labour hold		Swing	–1.2	

General election 2017: Leyton and Wanstead
Party	Candidate	Votes	%	±%
Labour	John Cryer	32,234	69.8	+11.2
Conservative	Laura Farris	9,627	20.8	–1.2
Liberal Democrats	Ben Sims	2,961	6.4	+0.7
Green	Ashley Gunstock	1,351	2.9	–4.4
Majority		22,607	49.0	+12.4
Turnout		46,173	70.9	+7.9
Registered electors		65,149		
Labour hold		Swing	+6.2	

General election 2015: Leyton and Wanstead
Party	Candidate	Votes	%	±%
Labour	John Cryer	23,858	58.6	+15.0
Conservative	Matthew Scott	8,939	22.0	–0.2
Green	Ashley Gunstock	2,974	7.3	+5.9
UKIP	Rosamund Beattie	2,341	5.8	+3.1
Liberal Democrats	Carl Quilliam	2,304	5.7	–21.9
Independent	Mahtab Aziz	289	0.7	N/A
Majority		14,919	36.6	+20.6
Turnout		40,705	63.0	–0.2
Registered electors		64,580		
Labour hold		Swing	+7.6	

General election 2010: Leyton and Wanstead
Party	Candidate	Votes	%	±%
Labour	John Cryer	17,511	43.6	−2.2
Liberal Democrats	Farooq Qureshi	11,095	27.6	+2.9
Conservative	Ed Northover	8,928	22.2	−0.5
UKIP	Graham Wood	1,080	2.7	+0.9
Green	Ashley Gunstock	562	1.4	−3.0
BNP	Jim Clift	561	1.4	N/A
Christian	Sonika Bhatti	342	0.9	N/A
Independents Federation UK	Martin Levin	80	0.2	N/A
Majority		6,416	16.0	−4.6
Turnout		40,159	63.2	+9.3
Registered electors		63,541		
Labour hold		Swing	-2.6	

=== Elections in the 2000s ===
General election 2005: Leyton and Wanstead
Party	Candidate	Votes	%	±%
Labour	Harry Cohen	15,234	45.8	−12.2
Liberal Democrats	Meher Khan	8,377	25.2	+9.2
Conservative	Julien Foster	7,393	22.2	+2.5
Green	Ashley Gunstock	1,522	4.6	+1.5
UKIP	Nick Jones	591	1.8	+0.7
Independent	Marc Robertson	155	0.5	N/A
Majority		6,857	20.6	−17.7
Turnout		33,272	55.0	+0.2
Registered electors		60,444		
Labour hold		Swing	−10.7	

General election 2001: Leyton and Wanstead
Party	Candidate	Votes	%	±%
Labour	Harry Cohen	19,558	58.0	−2.8
Conservative	Edward G. Heckels	6,654	19.7	−2.5
Liberal Democrats	Alexander I.M.C. Wilcock	5,389	16.0	+0.9
Green	Ashley Gunstock	1,030	3.1	N/A
Socialist Alliance	Sally A. Labern	709	2.1	N/A
UKIP	Michael J. D'Ingurthorpe	378	1.1	N/A
Majority		12,904	38.3	−0.3
Turnout		33,718	54.8	−8.4
Registered electors		61,549		
Labour hold		Swing	-0.2	

=== Elections in the 1990s ===
General election 1997: Leyton and Wanstead
Party	Candidate	Votes	%	±%
Labour	Harry Cohen	23,922	60.8	
Conservative	Robert Vaudry	8,736	22.2	
Liberal Democrats	Charles Anglin	5,920	15.1	
ProLife Alliance	Sean Duffy	488	1.2	
Independent	Abdul Mian	256	0.7	
Majority		15,186	38.6	
Turnout		39,322	63.2	
Registered electors		62,176		
Labour win (new seat)				

== See also ==
- Parliamentary constituencies in London
