= Chingford (electoral division) =

Electoral division in Greater London, 1973–1986

- Former electoral division for the Greater London Council
- Chingford electoral division boundaries
- District: Waltham Forest
- Electorate: 53,191 (1973); 56,030 (1977); 55,993 (1981)
- Major settlements: Chingford
- Area: 1,735 hectares (17.35 km^{2})

Former electoral division
- Created: 1973
- Abolished: 1986
- Member: 1
- Created from: Waltham Forest

Chingford was an electoral division for the purposes of elections to the Greater London Council. The constituency elected one councillor for a four-year term in 1973, 1977 and 1981, with the final term extended for an extra year ahead of the abolition of the Greater London Council.

== History ==
It was planned to use the same boundaries as the Westminster Parliament constituencies for election of councillors to the Greater London Council (GLC), as had been the practice for elections to the predecessor London County Council, but those that existed in 1965 crossed the Greater London boundary. Until new constituencies could be settled, the 32 London boroughs were used as electoral areas. The London Borough of Waltham Forest formed the Waltham Forest electoral division. This was used for the Greater London Council elections in 1964, 1967 and 1970.

The new constituencies were settled following the Second Periodic Review of Westminster constituencies and the new electoral division matched the boundaries of the Chingford parliamentary constituency.

It covered an area of 1,735 hectares (17.35 km^{2}).

== Elections ==
The Chingford constituency was used for the Greater London Council elections in 1973, 1977 and 1981. One councillor was elected at each election using first-past-the-post voting.

=== 1973 election ===
The fourth election to the GLC (and first using revised boundaries) was held on 12 April 1973. The electorate was 53,191 and one Conservative Party councillor was elected. The turnout was 43.4%. The councillor was elected for a three-year term. This was extended for an extra year in 1976 when the electoral cycle was switched to four-yearly.

1973 Greater London Council election: Chingford
Party	Candidate	Votes	%	±%
Conservative	Richard Maddock Brew	9,905	42.86	
Labour	F. F. Land	7,520	32.55	
Liberal	Barry R Woodward	5,685	24.60	
Turnout				
Conservative win (new seat)				

=== 1977 election ===
The fifth election to the GLC (and second using revised boundaries) was held on 5 May 1977. The electorate was 56,030 and one Conservative Party councillor was elected. The turnout was 47.2%. The councillor was elected for a four-year term.

1977 Greater London Council election: Chingford
Party	Candidate	Votes	%	±%
Conservative	Richard Maddock Brew	16,496	62.34	
Labour	Michael A Killingworth	5,915	22.34	
National Front	Doreen M South	2,095	7.91	
Liberal	Henry A Boyle	1,960	7.41	
Turnout				
Conservative hold		Swing		

=== 1981 election ===
The sixth and final election to the GLC (and third using revised boundaries) was held on 7 May 1981. The electorate was 55,993 and one Conservative Party councillor was elected. The turnout was 46.0%. The councillor was elected for a four-year term, extended by an extra year by the Local Government (Interim Provisions) Act 1984, ahead of the abolition of the council.

1981 Greater London Council election: Chingford
Party	Candidate	Votes	%	±%
Conservative	Richard Maddock Brew	13,501	52.45	
Labour	Benjamin B. Birnbaum	7,057	27.41	
Liberal	Lucille D. Wells	3,634	14.11	
Ecology	John E. Morgan	847	3.29	
National Front	Irene McDuff	694	2.70	
Turnout				
Conservative hold		Swing		
