= Calvin Bailey =

British politician (born 1977)

Wing Commander Calvin Bailey MBE
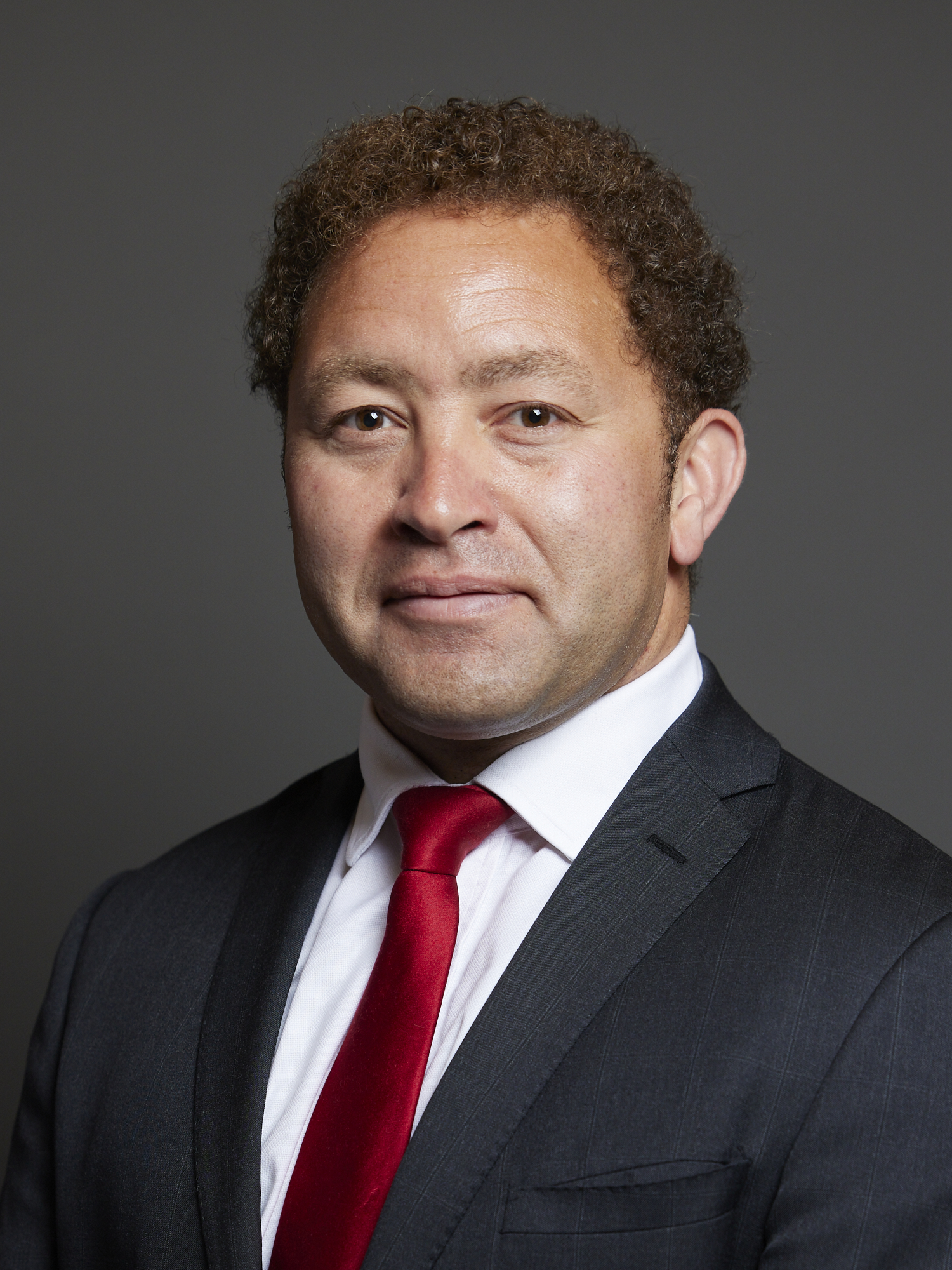
- Official portrait, 2024

Parliamentary Under-Secretary of State for Veterans and People
- Incumbent
- Assumed office 12 June 2026
- Prime Minister: Keir Starmer; Andy Burnham
- Preceded by: Louise Sandher-Jones

Member of Parliament for Leyton and Wanstead
- Incumbent
- Assumed office 4 July 2024
- Preceded by: John Cryer
- Majority: 13,964 (32.0%)

Personal details
- Born: Calvin George Bailey; 1977 or 1978 (age 48–49) Zambia
- Party: Labour
- Children: 4
- Education: University of Exeter (MEng); King's College London (MA)
- Awards: Member of the Order of the British Empire

Military service
- Allegiance: United Kingdom
- Branch/service: Royal Air Force
- Years of service: 1999–2024
- Rank: Wing Commander
- Commands: No. LXX Squadron RAF; No. 903 Expeditionary Air Wing

Calvin George Bailey MBE MP (born 1977) is a British politician and former Royal Air Force officer who has served as Parliamentary Under-Secretary of State for Veterans and People since 2026. A member of the Labour Party, he has been Member of Parliament (MP) for Leyton and Wanstead since 2024.

== Early life and education ==
Bailey was born in 1977 in Zambia. As a child, his family moved to London, where Bailey grew up in Plumstead and attended a now defunct comprehensive school. He was friends with the brother of Stephen Lawrence who was murdered in a racially motivated attack in 1993, and is now "very embarrassed to say" that he illegally carried a knife in the aftermath.

Bailey graduated with a Master of Engineering (MEng) degree from the University of Exeter in 1999. He later completed a Master of Arts (MA) degree in war studies at King's College London in 2017.

== Military service ==
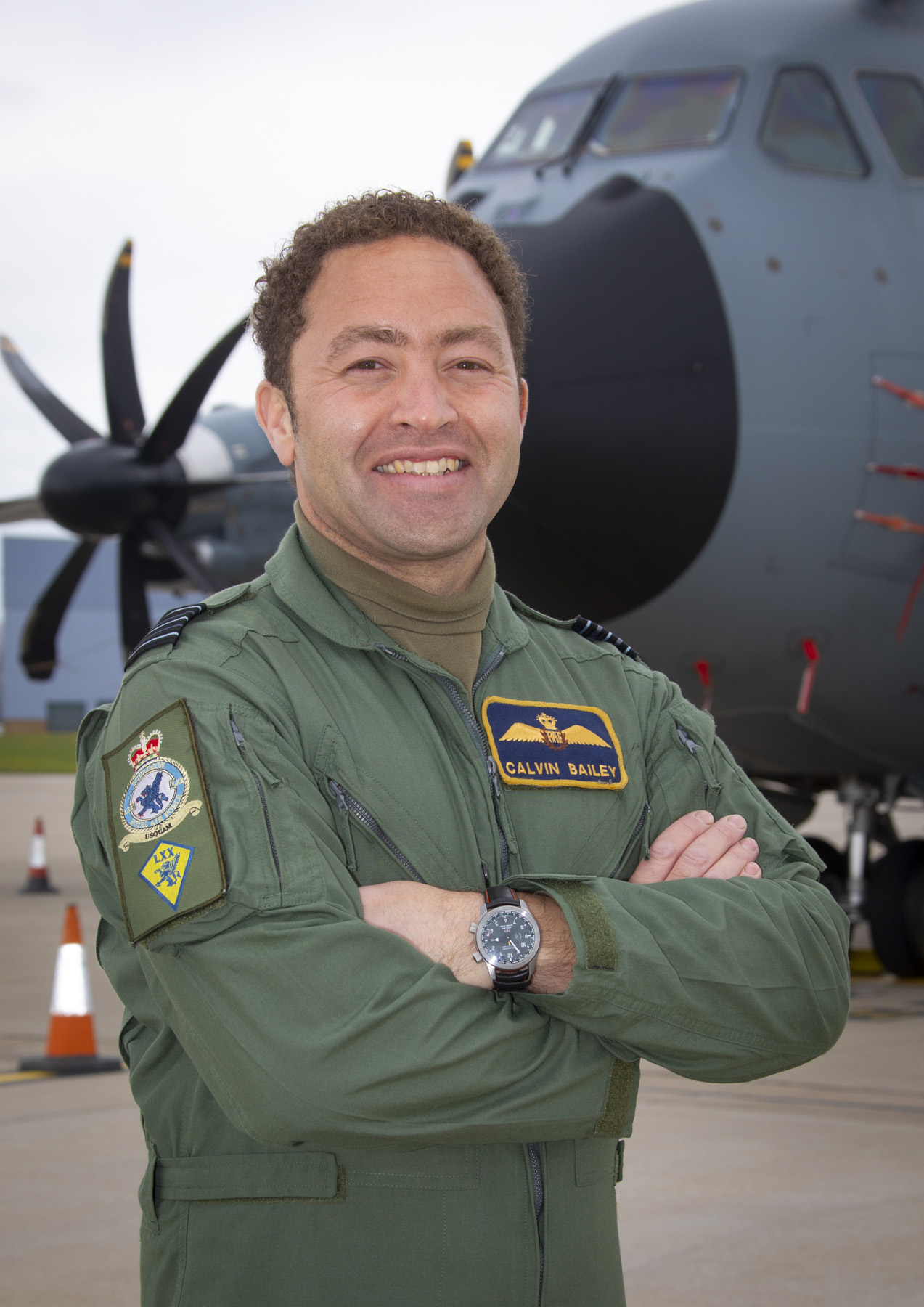
Wing Commander Bailey in 2021

On 3 October 1999, Bailey was commissioned in the Royal Air Force with the rank of pilot officer. He was promoted to flying officer on 3 April 2000, and to flight lieutenant on 3 April 2001. From 2001 to 2007, he flew the C-130 Hercules with No. 47 Squadron RAF. From 2007 to 2010, he served with the United States Air Force as part of the Pilot Exchange Program, flying with 15th Special Operations Squadron. He was second in command of No. 47 Squadron RAF from 2013 to 2016.

In 2013, he was awarded the Air Medal by the President of the United States "in recognition of meritorious, gallant and distinguished services during coalition operations in Afghanistan". In February 2015, he was appointed Member of the Order of the British Empire (MBE) "in recognition of gallant and distinguished services in the field during the period 1 October 2013 to 30 June 2014". He received the Royal Air Force Long Service and Good Conduct Medal in 2018.

Bailey was promoted to wing commander on 30 August 2016. In 2020, he was officer commanding No. 903 Expeditionary Air Wing as part of Operation Shader. In May 2021, he became officer commanding No. LXX (70) Squadron RAF which operated the Airbus A400M Atlas. He was the detachment commander of the deployed Air Mobility Forces during Operation Pitting, the UK's military operation to evacuate British nationals and eligible Afghans from Kabul Airport, Afghanistan. It was his decision to double the number of passengers taken per flight, as the risk of overloading the aircraft was outweighed by the risk to the lives of those who would have been left behind.

Bailey retired from the Royal Air Force after 24 years of service, having been elected a member of parliament.

== Political career ==
On 4 July 2024, Bailey was elected Member of Parliament (MP) for Leyton and Wanstead with 20,755 votes (47.5%) and a majority of 13,964. On 24 July 2024, he made his maiden speech during a debate on the Global Combat Air Programme.

In November 2024, Bailey voted in favour of the Terminally Ill Adults (End of Life) Bill, which proposes to legalise assisted suicide.

Bailey became a junior minister in Keir Starmer's government when he was appointed Parliamentary Under-Secretary of State for Veterans and People on 12 June 2026.

== Personal life ==
Married since 2003, Bailey has four children, two daughters and two sons. He was a parent governor of St John's Marlborough, Wiltshire, since March 2003.

Parliament of the United Kingdom
Preceded by John Cryer	Member of Parliament for Leyton and Wanstead; 2024–present	Incumbent
