= Harry Cohen =

British Labour politician

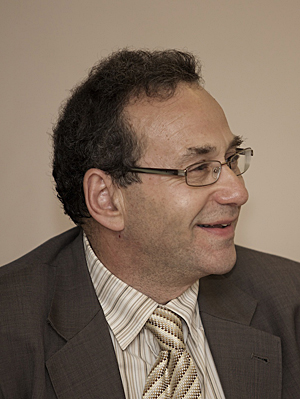
- Cohen in 2009

Member of Parliament for Leyton and Wanstead Leyton (1983–1997)
- In office 9 June 1983 – 12 April 2010
- Preceded by: Bryan Magee
- Succeeded by: John Cryer

Personal details
- Born: 10 December 1949 (age 76) Hackney, London
- Party: Labour
- Spouse: Ellen Cohen
- Education: Birkbeck College, London
- Profession: Accountant (CIPFA)

Harry Michael Cohen (born 10 December 1949) is a British Labour Party politician, who was the Member of Parliament (MP) for Leyton from 1983 to 1997 and Leyton and Wanstead from 1997 to 2010.

== Early life ==
Cohen left the George Gascoigne Secondary Modern school (closed in 1966) on Queens Road in Walthamstow at 15, and trained as a public service accountant at the Chartered Institute of Public Finance and Accountancy, as well as studying part-time at East Ham Technical College (now Newham College of Further Education). He later gained MSc in Politics and Administration from Birkbeck College, University of London in 1995. He became an accountant and auditor for the boroughs of Waltham Forest, Hackney and Haringey, then later for the union NALGO (became part of UNISON in 1993).

He was elected as a local councillor in Waltham Forest at the age of 22, and served for 11 years before becoming an MP.

== Parliamentary career ==
Cohen was first elected to the House of Commons at the 1983 general election as MP for Leyton, transferring to the new Leyton and Wanstead constituency after boundary changes for the 1997 general election.

He was a member of the House of Commons Defence Select Committee between 1997 and 2001, and has been a member of the Work and Pensions Select Committee since 2005.

On 31 October 2006, Cohen was one of 12 Labour MPs to back Plaid Cymru and the Scottish National Party's call for an inquiry into the Iraq War.

Cohen was Chairman of the All-Party Parliamentary Group for Tibet and Secretary of the All-Party Parliamentary Race and Community Group and was a member of the Socialist Campaign Group, a signatory to Jews for Justice for Palestinians, and counts Karl Marx, Mahatma Gandhi, Nelson Mandela and the Dalai Lama as political influences.

=== Expenses ===
It was revealed in March 2009 that Cohen had received £104,701 over the previous five years under the Additional Costs Allowance for his Wanstead home based upon the representation that this was his second home. The home that Cohen represented as his primary home was a house in Colchester, despite the fact that Cohen spent very little time at that location and used it only as a holiday home. As his Wanstead home is where Cohen resides both when going to Westminster and attending to his constituency, the claim of the Additional Costs Allowance was criticised as an abuse of an expense allowance intended to help Members of Parliament who need to maintain one home in their constituency and another in London. Cohen responded to criticism by stating that the Additional Costs Allowance was intended to be de facto salary for Members of Parliament.

On 30 June 2009 he announced he would not stand for re-election. He said the strain caused by the criticism over his expenses, and the formal investigation into his claims, were the main factors behind his departure.

On 22 January 2010 the Standards and Privileges Committee of the House of Commons published its report into Cohen's expenses and concluded that he had received over £60,000 in expenses to which he was not entitled. The report did recognise that the ill-health of Cohen's wife (she suffered a stroke in 2004) had been a significant factor in the decisions he had made but maintained that he had still committed a serious breach of the rules. The report recommended that Cohen apologise to the House, which he did on 29 January 2010, and that the Resettlement Grant of £65,000, normally paid to Members of Parliament upon retirement, be withheld. The House ratified the latter punishment on 1 February 2010.

Parliament of the United Kingdom
Preceded by Bryan Magee	Member of Parliament for Leyton; 1983–1997	Constituency abolished
New constituency	Member of Parliament for Leyton and Wanstead; 1997–2010	Succeeded by John Cryer
