= Waltham Forest (electoral division) =

Electoral division in Greater London, 1965–1973

- Former electoral division for the Greater London Council
- Waltham Forest electoral division boundaries
- District: London Borough of Waltham Forest
- Population: 235,880 (1969 estimate)
- Electorate: 175,107 (1964); 170,725 (1967); 179,670 (1970)
- Area: 9,803.8 acres (39.675 km^{2})

Former electoral division
- Created: 1965
- Abolished: 1973
- Member(s): 3
- Replaced by: Chingford, Leyton and Walthamstow

Waltham Forest was an electoral division for the purposes of elections to the Greater London Council. The constituency elected three councillors for a three-year term in 1964, 1967 and 1970.

== History ==
It was planned to use the same boundaries as the Westminster Parliament constituencies for election of councillors to the Greater London Council (GLC), as had been the practice for elections to the predecessor London County Council, but those that existed in 1965 crossed the Greater London boundary. Until new constituencies could be settled, the 32 London boroughs were used as electoral areas, which therefore created a constituency called Waltham Forest.

The electoral division was replaced from 1973 by the single-member electoral divisions of Chingford, Leyton and Walthamstow.

== Elections ==
The Waltham Forest constituency was used for the Greater London Council elections in 1964, 1967 and 1970. Three councillors were elected at each election using first-past-the-post voting.

=== 1964 election ===
The first election was held on 9 April 1964, a year before the council came into its powers. The electorate was 175,107 and three Labour Party councillors were elected. With 70,912 people voting, the turnout was 40.5%. The councillors were elected for a three-year term.

1964 Greater London Council election: Waltham Forest
Party	Candidate	Votes	%	±%
Labour	James Albert Edward Collins	35,338		
Labour	Betty Kathleen Lowton	33,299		
Labour	Mavis Joan Webster	31,872		
Conservative	M. J. Harvey	22,980		
Conservative	J. Gordon	22,158		
Conservative	G. W. Mason	21,113		
Ratepayers	W. J. Bowstead	6,624		
Liberal	J. M. Bishop	5,995		
Ratepayers	L. E. Norman	5,557		
Ratepayers	T. H. Oakman	5,393		
Liberal	W. T. Neilson-Hansen	4,944		
Liberal	W. V. E. Seymer	4,748		
Communist	D. J. Solomons	1,289		
Turnout				
Labour win (new seat)				
Labour win (new seat)				
Labour win (new seat)				

=== 1967 election ===
The second election was held on 13 April 1967. The electorate was 170,725 and three Conservative Party councillors were elected. With 67,314 people voting, the turnout was 39.4%. The councillors were elected for a three-year term.

1967 Greater London Council election: Waltham Forest
Party	Candidate	Votes	%	±%
Conservative	Norman Sidney Munday	34,594		
Conservative	George Edward Mynott	34,190		
Conservative	Gordon Alexander Webb	33,043		
Labour	James Albert Edward Collins	24,239		
Labour	Betty Kathleen Lowton	22,837		
Labour	N. E. Willis	21,918		
Liberal	D. W. Bramley	5,706		
Liberal	D. G. Kirkland	5,664		
Liberal	J. T. Silvey	5,367		
Communist	J. A. Courcouf	2,354		
Conservative gain from Labour		Swing		
Conservative gain from Labour		Swing		
Conservative gain from Labour		Swing		

=== 1970 election ===
The third election was held on 9 April 1970. The electorate was 179,670 and three Conservative Party councillors were elected. With 64,596 people voting, the turnout was 35.9%. The councillors were elected for a three-year term.

1970 Greater London Council election: Waltham Forest
Party	Candidate	Votes	%	±%
Conservative	Norman Sidney Munday	31,190		
Conservative	Phillip Charles Desmond Williams	30,833		
Conservative	Gordon Alexander Webb	30,780		
Labour	R. F. Drew	28,847		
Labour	J. J. Walsh	28,645		
Labour	Betty Kathleen Lowton	28,207		
Liberal	M. E. D. Flanders	2,472		
Liberal	D. G. Kirkland	2,433		
Liberal	L. C. A. Roskilly	2,117		
Communist	J. A. Courcouf	1,016		
Union Movement	E. C. Stoneman	436		
Turnout				
Conservative hold		Swing		
Conservative hold		Swing		
Conservative hold		Swing		
