= John Cryer =

British politician (born 1964)

The Right Honourable The Lord Cryer
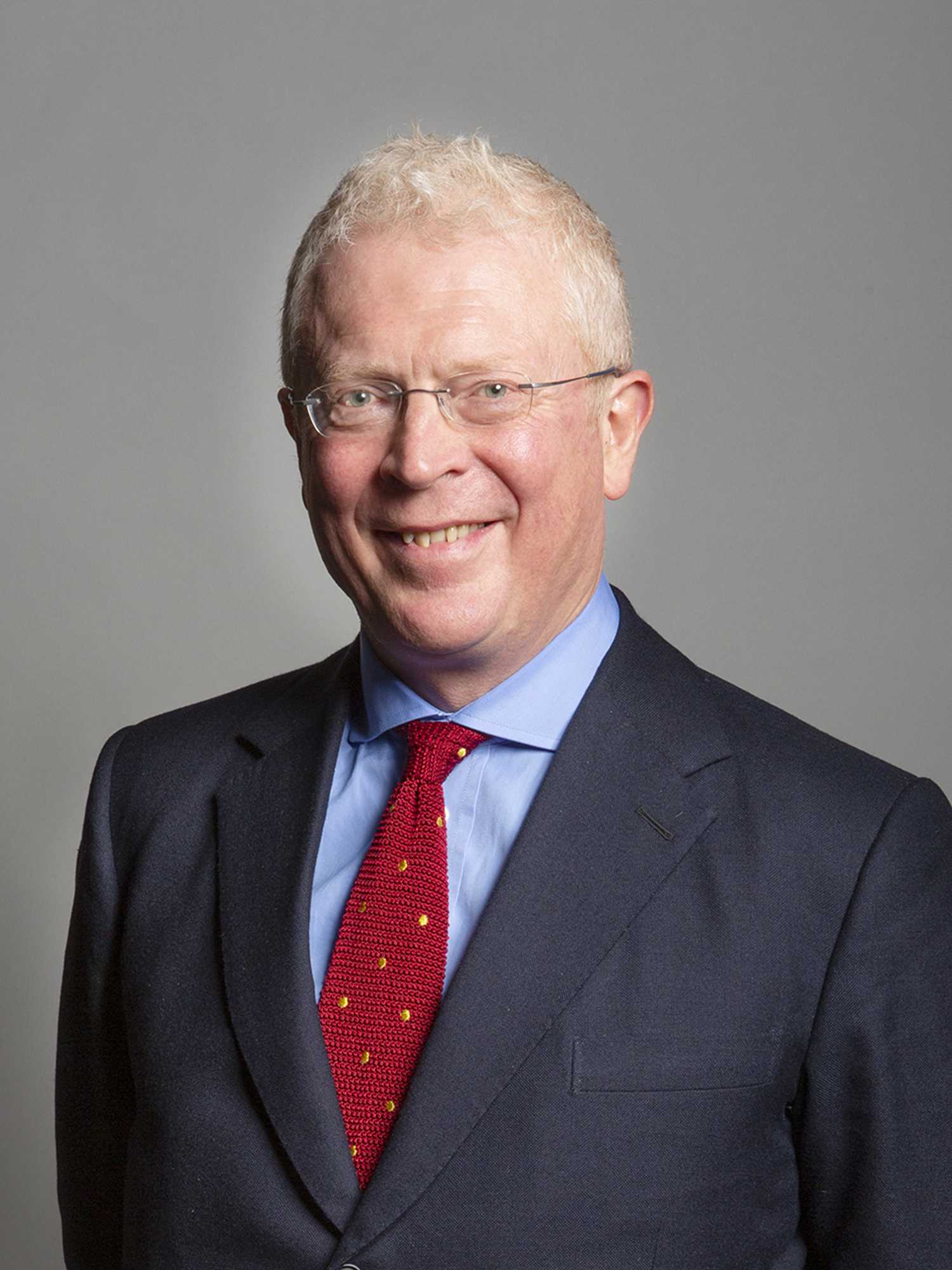
- Official portrait, 2019

Lord-in-Waiting Government Whip
- In office 8 October 2024 – 14 February 2025
- Prime Minister: Keir Starmer

Member of the House of Lords
- Lord Temporal
- Life peerage 15 August 2024

Chair of the Parliamentary Labour Party
- In office 9 February 2015 – 30 May 2024
- Leader: Ed Miliband; Jeremy Corbyn; Keir Starmer
- Preceded by: David Watts
- Succeeded by: Jessica Morden

Member of Parliament
- In office 6 May 2010 – 30 May 2024
- Preceded by: Harry Cohen
- Succeeded by: Calvin Bailey
- Constituency: Leyton and Wanstead
- In office 1 May 1997 – 11 April 2005
- Preceded by: Robin Squire
- Succeeded by: James Brokenshire
- Constituency: Hornchurch

Personal details
- Born: John Robert Cryer; 11 April 1964 (age 62) Darwen, Lancashire, England
- Party: Labour
- Spouse: Ellie Reeves (m. 2012)
- Children: 2
- Parents: Bob Cryer (father); Ann Cryer (mother)
- Education: Hatfield Polytechnic; London College of Printing
- Website: www.johncryermp.co.uk

John Robert Cryer, Baron Cryer (born 11 April 1964), is a British politician. A member of the Labour Party, he was previously the Member of Parliament (MP) for Hornchurch from 1997 to 2005 and the MP for Leyton and Wanstead from 2010 to 2024. Cryer was Chair of the Parliamentary Labour Party from 2015 to 2024, and was a lord-in-waiting in the House of Lords from 2024 until 2025.

== Early life and career ==
John Robert Cryer was born on 11 April 1964 to Bob Cryer and Ann Cryer (née Place). Both of his parents were Labour Party members of Parliament, and Cryer served alongside his mother in the Commons from 1997 to 2005. As a child, he appeared in the 1970 film The Railway Children.

A journalist by profession, Cryer was educated at Oakbank School, Keighley, Hatfield Polytechnic, and the London College of Printing. He has worked for Tribune, the Morning Star, the Associated Society of Locomotive Engineers and Firemen (ASLEF), and the Transport and General Workers' Union (now Unite).

== Political career ==
Cryer was on the left wing of the Labour Party and was a member of the Socialist Campaign Group until he resigned from the group in 2015. He has subsequently moved to the right of the party, supporting Keir Starmer's centrist leadership.

Cryer describes himself as a Eurosceptic, and was one of only a small number of Labour MPs who campaigned and voted for the UK to leave the European Union in the 2016 referendum. He consistently opposed holding a second referendum on EU membership.

As Member of Parliament for Hornchurch, Cryer had a record as a rebel. He voted against tuition fees and top-up fees for higher education, against cuts in lone parent benefits (the first major rebellion under the Blair government) and against the Iraq War. He lost this marginal seat in 2005, before being selected to succeed Harry Cohen in Leyton and Wanstead, a safe Labour seat; he comfortably retained it for the party at the 2010 general election.

Cryer was one of 16 signatories of an open letter to Ed Miliband in January 2015 calling on the party to commit to oppose further austerity, take rail franchises back into public ownership and strengthen collective bargaining arrangements.

On 9 February 2015, Cryer was elected, unopposed, to succeed Dave Watts as the Chair of the Parliamentary Labour Party.

On 8 May 2015, Cryer was re-elected as MP for the Leyton and Wanstead constituency with 58.6% of the vote. On 8 June 2017, he was re-elected as MP for the Leyton and Wanstead constituency with 69.8% of the vote.

In July 2019, following the BBC Panorama programme "Is Labour Antisemitic?", Cryer condemned his party's attack on former staff whistleblowers who had appeared in the programme as "a gross misjudgment".

Cryer did not seek re-election as an MP at the 2024 general election held in July. After being nominated in the 2024 Dissolution Honours, he was created Baron Cryer, of Leyton in the London Borough of Waltham Forest, on 15 August 2024.

== Personal life ==
Cryer's second wife is Attorney General Ellie Reeves, the Labour MP for Lewisham West and East Dulwich – whose sister is Rachel Reeves, also a Labour MP and former Chancellor of the Exchequer. They have two sons, born in 2015 and 2019.

Parliament of the United Kingdom
Preceded by Robin Squire	Member of Parliament for Hornchurch; 1997–2005	Succeeded by James Brokenshire
Preceded by Harry Cohen	Member of Parliament for Leyton and Wanstead; 2010–2024	Succeeded by Calvin Bailey
Party political offices
Preceded by David Watts	Chair of the Parliamentary Labour Party; 2015–2024	Succeeded by Jessica Morden
Orders of precedence in the United Kingdom
Preceded by The Lord Beamish	Gentlemen; Baron Cryer	Followed by The Lord Elliott of Ballinamallard
