= Parliamentary Under-Secretary of State for Veterans and People =

Senior ministerial position in the Government of the United Kingdom

United Kingdom Parliamentary Under-Secretary of State for Veterans and People
- Royal Arms of His Majesty's Government

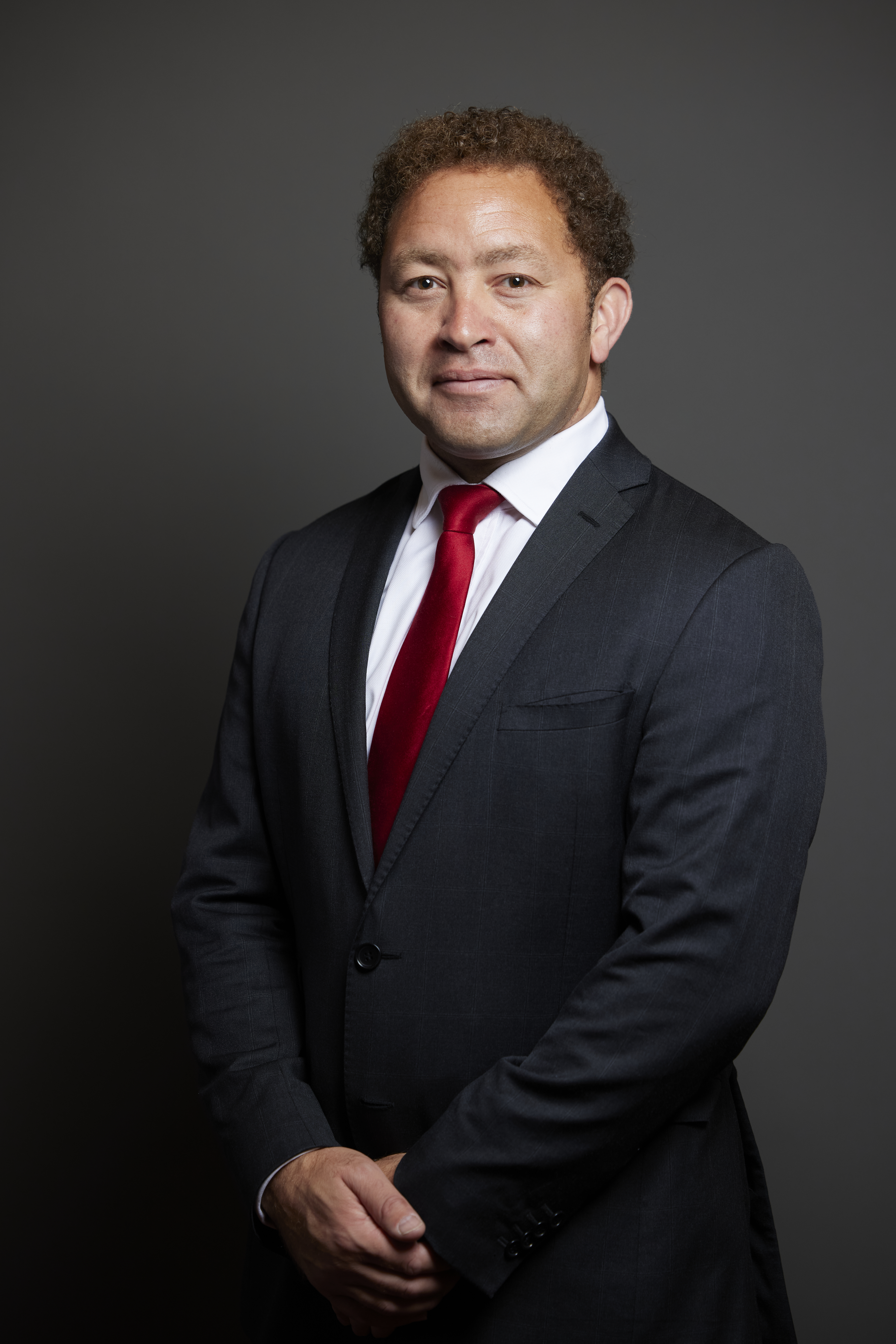
- Incumbent; Calvin Bailey since 12 June 2026
- Ministry of Defence
- Style: Veterans Minister (informal)
- Type: Minister of the Crown
- Status: Parliamentary Under-Secretary of State
- Reports to: Prime Minister of the United Kingdom
- Seat: Westminster
- Nominator: Prime Minister
- Appointer: The Monarch; (on the advice of the Prime Minister)
- Term length: At His Majesty's pleasure
- Formation: July 1989: (as Parliamentary Under-Secretary of State for Defence); July 2022: (as Minister of State for Veterans' Affairs); July 2024: (as Parliamentary Under-Secretary of State for Veterans)
- First holder: Earl of Arran (as Parliamentary Under-Secretary of State for Defence)
- Website: Official website

The Parliamentary Under-Secretary of State for Veterans and People is a ministerial position in the Ministry of Defence in British government, currently held by Calvin Bailey. From 2022 to 2024, the role was Minister of State for Veterans' Affairs in Cabinet Office and the minister attended the Cabinet.

== History ==
It was formerly known as Parliamentary Under-Secretary of State for Defence from 1989 to 2005 and as Parliamentary Under-Secretary of State for Defence Veterans, Reserves and Personnel under Tobias Ellwood.

Johnny Mercer was appointed minister in July 2019 to the new government by incoming Prime Minister Boris Johnson. On 20 April 2021, Mercer was "sacked by text" after offering to resign at the end of Wednesday 21 April, but refusing to go earlier. In a tweet, Mercer said he was "relieved of [his] responsibilities in Government" because of his disagreements with the scope of the proposed Overseas Operations Bill. This new government law is designed to protect veterans from unfounded prosecutions. However, Mercer said it was a "red line" for him that British soldiers who served in Northern Ireland are excluded.

On 7 July 2024, after the 2024 United Kingdom General Election Mercer criticised Sir Keir Starmer’s new Labour government for failing to appoint a new Minister of State for Veterans' Affairs at the same time as the rest of his cabinet. He said; "You will note already that, despite his explicit personal promises in the election campaign, Keir Starmer has not appointed a veterans minister to his cabinet", adding, "If you understand what veterans need from their Government, this matters very much".

Alistair Carns was appointed Minister for Veterans on 9 July 2024; the position is now that of a parliamentary under-secretary of state, the most junior level of minister.

== Responsibilities ==
The minister has the following ministerial responsibilities:

- Civilian and service personnel policy
- Armed forces pay, pensions and compensation
- Armed Forces Covenant
- Welfare and service families
- Community engagement
- Equality, diversity and inclusion
- Veterans (including resettlement, transition, defence charities and Ministerial Covenant and Veterans Board, and Office of Veteran Affairs)
- Legacy issues and non-operational public inquiries and inquests
- Mental health
- Defence Medical Services
- The people programme (Flexible Engagement Strategy, Future Accommodation Model and Enterprise Approach)
- Estates service family accommodation policy and engagement with welfare

== List of ministers ==
Name	Portrait	Entered office	Left office	Political party	Prime Minister
Parliamentary Under-Secretary of State for Defence
The Earl of Arran		25 July 1989	26 July 1990	Conservative	Margaret Thatcher
Kenneth Carlisle		October 1990	March 1992	Conservative	John Major
The Earl of Arran		28 November 1990	15 April 1992	Conservative	John Major
Viscount Cranborne		22 April 1992	20 July 1994	Conservative	John Major
The Lord Henley		20 July 1994	5 July 1995	Conservative	John Major
The Earl Howe		5 July 1995	2 May 1997	Conservative	John Major
John Spellar		6 May 1997	28 July 1999	Labour	Tony Blair
Peter Kilfoyle		28 July 1999	30 January 2000	Labour	Tony Blair
Lewis Moonie		31 January 2001	13 June 2003	Labour	Tony Blair
Ivor Caplin		13 June 2003	11 May 2005	Labour	Tony Blair
Parliamentary Under-Secretary of State for Veterans
Don Touhig		11 May 2005	5 May 2006	Labour	Tony Blair
Tom Watson		5 May 2006	6 September 2006	Labour	Tony Blair
Derek Twigg		6 September 2006	5 October 2008	Labour	Tony Blair
Derek Twigg		6 September 2006	5 October 2008	Labour	Gordon Brown
Kevan Jones		5 October 2008	11 May 2010	Labour	Gordon Brown
Parliamentary Under-Secretary of State for Welfare and Veterans
Andrew Robathan		13 May 2010	4 September 2012	Conservative	David Cameron
Minister of State for Defence Personnel, Welfare and Veterans
Mark Francois		4 September 2012	7 October 2013	Conservative	David Cameron
Anna Soubry		7 October 2013	11 May 2015	Conservative	David Cameron
Parliamentary Under-Secretary of State for Defence Veterans, Reserves and Personnel
Mark Lancaster		12 May 2015	13 June 2017	Conservative	David Cameron
Mark Lancaster		12 May 2015	13 June 2017	Conservative	Theresa May
Tobias Ellwood		14 June 2017	26 July 2019	Conservative	Theresa May
Parliamentary Under-Secretary of State for Defence People and Veterans
Johnny Mercer		28 July 2019	20 April 2021	Conservative	Boris Johnson
Leo Docherty		20 April 2021	7 July 2022	Conservative	Boris Johnson
Minister of State for Veterans' Affairs
Johnny Mercer		7 July 2022	6 September 2022	Conservative	Boris Johnson
Parliamentary Under-Secretary of State for Defence People, Veterans and Service Families
Sarah Atherton		20 September 2022	27 October 2022	Conservative	Liz Truss
Minister of State for Veterans' Affairs
Johnny Mercer		25 October 2022	5 July 2024	Conservative	Rishi Sunak
Parliamentary Under-Secretary of State for Veterans and People
Alistair Carns		9 July 2024	6 September 2025	Labour	Keir Starmer
Louise Sandher-Jones		6 September 2025	12 June 2026	Labour	Keir Starmer
Calvin Bailey		12 June 2026	Incumbent	Labour	Keir Starmer
Calvin Bailey		12 June 2026	Incumbent	Labour	Andy Burnham
