= 1965 Leyton by-election =

UK parliamentary by-election

- 21 January 1965

Leyton constituency
- Turnout: 57.7%
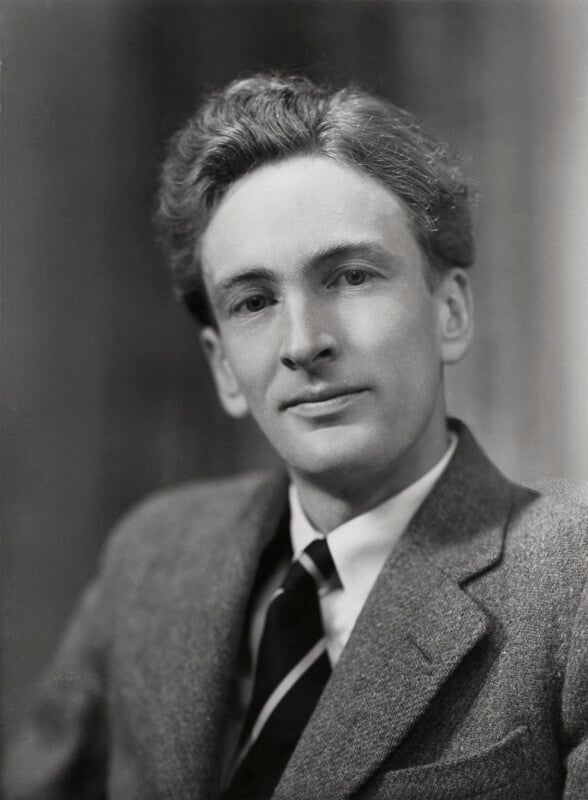

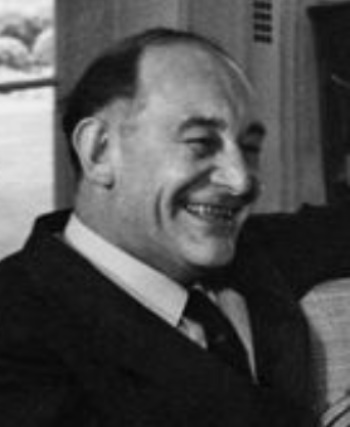
Candidate	Ronald Buxton	Patrick Gordon Walker	Alistair H. Mackay
Party	Conservative	Labour	Liberal
Popular vote	16,544	16,339	5,382
Percentage	42.9%	42.4%	14.0%
Swing	▲9.4%	▼8.0%	▼2.2%
MP before election
Reginald Sorensen
Labour
Elected MP
Ronald Buxton
Conservative

The 1965 Leyton by-election was a parliamentary by-election held on 21 January 1965 for the UK House of Commons constituency of Leyton, representing the town of Leyton in east London.

The seat had become vacant when the constituency's long-serving Labour Party Member of Parliament (MP), Reginald Sorensen, was made a life peer on 15 December 1964. An MP for over thirty years, his elevation to the peerage was intended to create a vacancy in a safe seat for the Foreign Secretary, Patrick Gordon Walker, who had been defeated in a shock result in the 1964 general election in his Smethwick constituency.

The result of the contest was not as planned: the Conservative Party candidate, Ronald Buxton, won by 205 votes, a swing from Labour of 8.7%. Gordon Walker resigned as Foreign Secretary but regained the seat for Labour at the 1966 general election.

== Previous result ==
General election 1964: Leyton
Party	Candidate	Votes	%	±%
Labour	Reginald Sorensen	23,640	50.35	−3.36
Conservative	Ronald Buxton	15,714	33.47	−12.82
Liberal	Alistair Mackay	7,598	16.18	New
Majority		7,926	16.88	+9.46
Turnout		46,592	70.18	−4.21
Registered electors		66,905		
Labour hold		Swing	-3.36	

== Result ==
1965 Leyton by-election
Party	Candidate	Votes	%	±%
Conservative	Ronald Buxton	16,544	42.9	+9.4
Labour	Patrick Gordon Walker	16,339	42.4	−8.0
Liberal	Alistair H Mackay	5,382	14.0	−2.2
UK & Commonwealth Party	Jeremiah Lynch	157	0.4	New
Disarmament	George Delf	156	0.4	New
Majority		205	0.5	N/A
Turnout		38,578	57.7	−12.5
Conservative gain from Labour		Swing	+8.7	

== See also ==
- List of United Kingdom by-elections (1950–1979)
