= Leyton West =

Parliamentary constituency in the United Kingdom, 1918–1950

- Former borough constituency for the House of Commons

1918–1950
- Seats: one
- Created from: Walthamstow
- Replaced by: Leyton

Leyton West was a parliamentary constituency in the Municipal Borough of Leyton – then part of Essex but now in Greater London. It returned one Member of Parliament (MP) to the House of Commons of the Parliament of the United Kingdom, elected by the first past the post system.

== History ==
The constituency was created for the 1918 general election, and abolished for the 1950 general election.

== Boundaries ==
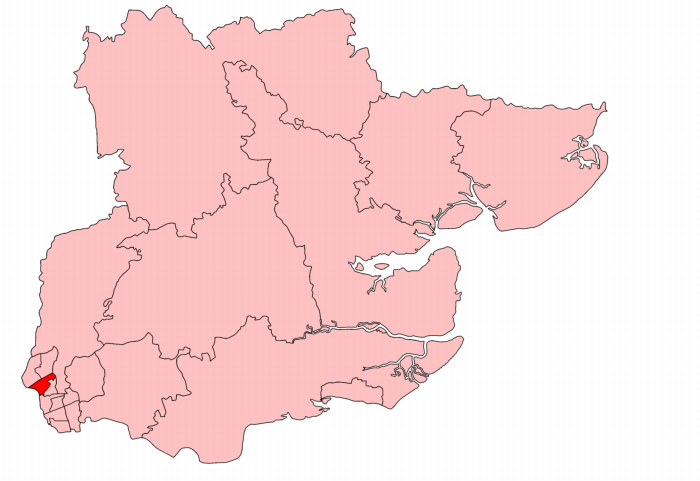
Leyton West in Essex 1918–1950

The Urban District of Leyton wards of Central, Forest, Lea Bridge, and Leyton.

== Members of Parliament ==
Election	Member	Party
1918	Harry Wrightson	Unionist
1919	Alfred Newbould	Liberal
1922	James Cassels	Unionist
1929	Reginald Sorensen	Labour
1931	Sir Wilfrid Sugden	Conservative
1935	Reginald Sorensen	Labour
1950	constituency abolished: see Leyton	

== Elections ==
=== Elections in the 1910s ===
1918 general election: Leyton West
Party		Candidate	Votes	%	±%
C	Unionist	Harry Wrightson	10,956	67.4	
	Liberal	Alfred Newbould	5,288	32.6	
Majority			5,668	34.8	
Turnout			16,244	49.9	
Registered electors			32,567		
	Unionist win (new seat)				
C indicates candidate endorsed by the coalition government.

1919 Leyton West by-election
Party		Candidate	Votes	%	±%
	Liberal	Alfred Newbould	7,934	57.3	+24.7
C	Unionist	James Francis Mason	5,915	42.7	−24.7
Majority			2,019	14.6	N/A
Turnout			13,849	42.5	−7.4
Registered electors			32,567		
	Liberal gain from Unionist		Swing	+24.7	
C indicates candidate endorsed by the coalition government.

=== Elections in the 1920s ===
General election 1922: Leyton West
Party	Candidate	Votes	%	±%
Unionist	James Cassels	11,157	46.8	−20.6
Liberal	Alfred Newbould	7,021	29.4	−3.2
Labour	Alfred Smith	5,673	23.8	New
Majority		4,136	17.4	−17.4
Turnout		23,851	69.0	+19.1
Registered electors		34,549		
Unionist hold		Swing	−8.7	

General election 1923: Leyton West
Party	Candidate	Votes	%	±%
Unionist	James Cassels	8,349	34.5	−12.3
Liberal	Alfred Newbould	8,285	34.3	+4.9
Labour	Alfred Smith	7,536	31.2	+7.4
Majority		64	0.2	−17.2
Turnout		24,170	68.0	−1.0
Registered electors		35,540		
Unionist hold		Swing	−8.6	

General election 1924: Leyton West
Party	Candidate	Votes	%	±%
Unionist	James Cassels	13,212	46.7	+12.2
Labour	Alfred Smith	9,809	34.7	+3.5
Liberal	Alfred Newbould	5,252	18.6	−15.7
Majority		3,403	12.0	+11.8
Turnout		28,273	78.6	+10.6
Registered electors		35,958		
Unionist hold		Swing	+4.4	

General election 1929: Leyton West
Party	Candidate	Votes	%	±%
Labour	Reginald Sorensen	14,339	42.1	+7.4
Unionist	James Cassels	12,186	35.8	−10.9
Liberal	James Johnston	7,526	22.1	+3.5
Majority		2,153	6.3	N/A
Turnout		34,051	74.8	−3.8
Registered electors		45,507		
Labour gain from Unionist		Swing	+9.2	

=== Elections in the 1930s ===
General election 1931: Leyton West
Party	Candidate	Votes	%	±%
Conservative	Wilfrid Sugden	23,048	63.7	+27.9
Labour	Reginald Sorensen	13,138	36.3	−5.8
Majority		9,910	27.4	+21.1
Turnout		36,086	75.0	+0.2
Conservative gain from Labour		Swing		

General election 1935: Leyton West
Party	Candidate	Votes	%	±%
Labour	Reginald Sorensen	16,408	50.2	+13.9
Conservative	Wilfrid Sugden	16,280	49.8	−13.9
Majority		128	0.4	N/A
Turnout		32,688	68.0	−7.0
Labour gain from Unionist		Swing		

=== Elections in the 1940s ===
General Election 1939–40:

Another General Election was required to take place before the end of 1940. The political parties had been making preparations for an election to take place and by the Autumn of 1939, the following candidates had been selected;

- Labour: Reginald Sorensen
- Conservative: Eric Hall

General election 1945: Leyton West
Party	Candidate	Votes	%	±%
Labour	Reginald Sorensen	17,236	58.5	+8.3
Conservative	Trevor Felix David Rose	8,507	28.9	−20.9
Liberal	Bernard Guyster	3,708	12.6	New
Majority		8,729	29.6	+29.2
Turnout		29,451	72.7	+4.7
Labour hold		Swing		
