= Walthamstow (electoral division) =

Electoral division in Greater London, 1973–1986

- Former electoral division for the Greater London Council
- Walthamstow electoral division boundaries
- District: Waltham Forest
- Electorate: 57,410 (1973); 50,247 (1977); 48,565 (1981)
- Major settlements: Walthamstow
- Area: 1,182 hectares (11.82 km^{2})

Former electoral division
- Created: 1973
- Abolished: 1986
- Member: 1
- Created from: Waltham Forest

Walthamstow was an electoral division for the purposes of elections to the Greater London Council. The constituency elected one councillor for a four-year term in 1973, 1977 and 1981, with the final term extended for an extra year ahead of the abolition of the Greater London Council.

== History ==
It was planned to use the same boundaries as the Westminster Parliament constituencies for election of councillors to the Greater London Council (GLC), as had been the practice for elections to the predecessor London County Council, but those that existed in 1965 crossed the Greater London boundary. Until new constituencies could be settled, the 32 London boroughs were used as electoral areas. The London Borough of Waltham Forest formed the Waltham Forest electoral division. This was used for the Greater London Council elections in 1964, 1967 and 1970.

The new constituencies were settled following the Second Periodic Review of Westminster constituencies and the new electoral division matched the boundaries of the Walthamstow parliamentary constituency.

It covered an area of 1,182 hectares (11.82 km^{2}).

== Elections ==
The Walthamstow constituency was used for the Greater London Council elections in 1973, 1977 and 1981. One councillor was elected at each election using first-past-the-post voting.

=== 1973 election ===
The fourth election to the GLC (and first using revised boundaries) was held on 12 April 1973. The electorate was 57,410 and one Labour Party councillor was elected. The turnout was 29.0%. The councillor was elected for a three-year term. This was extended for an extra year in 1976 when the electoral cycle was switched to four-yearly.

1973 Greater London Council election: Walthamstow
Party	Candidate	Votes	%	±%
Labour	Robin Ainsworth Raine Young	9,545	57.33	
Conservative	Phillip Charles Desmond Williams	4,381	26.31	
Liberal	Martin D Silverston	2,724	16.36	
Turnout				
Labour win (new seat)				

=== 1977 election ===
The fifth election to the GLC (and second using revised boundaries) was held on 5 May 1977. The electorate was 50,247 and one Labour Party councillor was elected. The turnout was 40.7%. The councillor was elected for a four-year term.

1977 Greater London Council election: Walthamstow
Party	Candidate	Votes	%	±%
Labour	Robin Ainsworth Raine Young	8,627	42.16	
Conservative	Gerald A King	8,235	40.25	
National Front	James R Childs	2,297	11.23	
Liberal	Mervin P O'Flanagan	1,302	6.36	
Turnout				
Labour hold		Swing		

=== 1981 election ===
The sixth and final election to the GLC (and third using revised boundaries) was held on 7 May 1981. The electorate was 48,565 and one Labour Party councillor was elected. The turnout was 43.3%. The councillor was elected for a four-year term, extended by an extra year by the Local Government (Interim Provisions) Act 1984, ahead of the abolition of the council.

1981 Greater London Council election: Walthamstow
Party	Candidate	Votes	%	±%
Labour	Paul Yaw Boateng	9,749	46.31	
Conservative	Mark A. L. Batchelor	5,293	25.15	
Social Democratic Alliance	Peter L. Leighton	3,068	14.58	
Liberal	Robert J. Wheatley	1,572	7.47	
National Front	George J. F. Flaxton	824	3.92	
Ecology	Jean Denise Lambert	544	2.58	
Turnout				
Labour hold		Swing		
