= James Cassels (politician) =

British politician (1877–1972)

Sir James Dale Cassels (22 March 1877 – 7 February 1972) was a British judge, journalist and Conservative politician.

== Early life ==
He was the only son of Robert Cassels, assistant clerk at the Bow Street Magistrates' Court. He was educated at the United Westminster City School where he learnt shorthand.

== Journalism ==
He began work as a reporter with the Sussex Coast Mercury in Worthing, subsequently moving to London, where he worked for the Chelsea News and the Fulham Chronicle. In 1898 he joined the staff of the Morning Post. He stayed with the paper for fourteen years, originally as a parliamentary correspondent, later becoming a sub-editor.

== Legal career ==
In 1908 Cassels was called to the bar at the Middle Temple. He practised on the South-Eastern Circuit, and his heavy caseload led to him abandoning journalism in 1911. His legal career was interrupted from 1916 to 1919 by the First World War. Cassels served on the Western Front, fighting at the Battle of Arras and was twice mentioned in dispatches. He reached the rank of captain, and chaired a number of courts martial.

In 1923 he took silk, appearing in the criminal courts and in the King's Bench Division of the High Court. He was leading counsel for the defence in the celebrated murder trials of Patrick Mahon (1924) and Sidney Harry Fox (1930), but was unable to secure an acquittal in either case, and also led the unsuccessful prosecution of Toni Mancini at Lewes Assizes (December 1934). His manner was brusque, and he was highly amused to be told that he was considered "the second rudest man at the Bar", Sir Patrick Hastings being the rudest.

In 1927 he was made recorder of Guildford and in 1928 recorder of Brighton. He was also chairman of East Sussex Quarter Sessions. In 1939 he was appointed as a judge, and received a knighthood. He presided over a number of notable trials in the 1950s before retiring in 1960. He served as a special Commissioner of Assize at Norwich in 1961 and at the Central Criminal Court in 1962, clearing a backlog of cases.

== Parliamentary career ==
At the 1922 general election, he was elected as MP for the Leyton West constituency in east London, unseating the Liberal, Alfred Newbould by over 4,000 votes. Cassels narrowly held the seat at the 1923 general election, with majority of only 64 votes over Newbould, but at the 1924 general election he increased his majority to 3,403.

However, he was defeated at the 1929 general election by Labour's Reginald Sorensen, who represented the constituency (with one brief interruption) until 1965.

Cassels did not contest the Leyton seat again, but at the 1931 general election he was elected as MP for Camberwell North West, with a large majority. He did not seek re-election at the 1935 general election, when he was succeeded by the Conservative Oscar Guest.

== Family ==
Cassels was married three times. He was survived by his third wife, Deodora née Croft, and by a son (also a judge) and daughter from his second marriage. He died in 1972 aged 94.

A biography by Iain Adamson, A Man of Quality, was published in 1964.

== In popular culture ==
In the 1981 Granada Television series Lady Killers, Cassels was played by Robert East in an episode entitled "A Boy's Best Friend", which depicted the trial of Sidney Harry Fox.

== Sources ==
- Craig, F. W. S. (1983) [1969]. British parliamentary election results 1918-1949 (3rd ed.). Chichester: Parliamentary Research Services. ISBN 0-900178-06-X.
- Leigh Rayment's Peerage Pages

Parliament of the United Kingdom
Preceded by Alfred Newbould	Member of Parliament for Leyton West; 1922–1929	Succeeded by Reginald Sorensen
Preceded by Hyacinth Morgan	Member of Parliament for Camberwell North West; 1931–1935	Succeeded by Oscar Guest
