= Alfred Newbould =

Member of Parliament for Leyton West
- In office 14 March 1919 – 15 November 1922
- Preceded by: Harry Wrightson
- Succeeded by: James Cassels

Personal details
- Born: Alfred Ernest Newbould; 24 October 1873 Burton upon Trent, Staffordshire, UK
- Died: 25 April 1952 (aged 78) Ferring, West Sussex, UK
- Party: Liberal
- Parent: J. J. Newbould (father)
- Profession: Cinematographer

Alfred Ernest Newbould (24 October 1873 – 25 April 1952) was a British cinematographer and a politician of the Liberal Party.

== Family and education ==
Newbould was born in Burton upon Trent in Staffordshire, the son of J. J. Newbould from the nearby village of Tatenhill. He was educated at Burton Grammar School. He was married twice, first in 1909 to Grace Lucy Kirby. They were divorced in November 1929. Just a few days after his divorce was made official, Newbould married Dorothy Irene Pugh by whom he already had one son, born early in 1929.

== Career ==
Newbould originally joined the British Army as a trooper in the 1st Royal Dragoons and fought in the Second Boer War, but his main profession was in the developing entertainment industry, the cinema. He was a director of Provincial Cinematograph Theatres and worked for Gaumont British as a publicist. He was also a chairman and Director of Associated Provincial Picture Houses Ltd; a director of London Film Company Ltd and director of Fenning's Film Service Ltd. He was sometime Chairman and later President of the Cinematograph Exhibitors' Association of Great Britain and Ireland, Chairman of the Cinematograph Trade Council and a member of the Entertainment Industry Committee. He was said to act as the Cinema Trades unofficial representative in the House of Commons.

== Politics ==
=== Leyton West, 1918 ===
Newbould first stood for Parliament at the 1918 general election in the east London constituency of Leyton West. As an Independent Liberal and supporter of H H Asquith he was not the recipient of the coalition 'coupon' which went instead to his Coalition Conservative opponent, Harry Wrightson. In a straight fight between Coalition Conservative and Liberal candidates, Wrightson emerged the winner with a healthy majority of 5,668 votes. Within days of the declaration of poll however, Wrightson contracted influenza, which deteriorated to pneumonia, and he died early in 1919, aged 44, six days before the new Parliament met and so was never able to take his seat.

=== Leyton West by-election ===
Wrightson's death necessitated a by-election and Newbould was again chosen to stand for the Liberals. His opponent was another Coalition Conservative, James Francis Mason. Once again there was no Labour candidate. In the by-election Newbould's main campaign points were the abolition of conscription and a crackdown on profiteering the first policy was said to appeal to men and the second to women. Unfortunately for part of the contest he was confined to bed with a bad cold and his wife was engaged as principal canvasser on his behalf On a turnout of 42.5% (down from the general election turnout of 49.9%), Newbould won what was seen as an important victory for the Asquithian Liberals improving his share of the vote from 32.6% at the general election to 57.3% in the by-election. According to psephologist John Ramsden, this amounted to a swing of 24.8% and was statistically one of the worst by-election reverses of the 1918-1922 government.

=== Liberal Reunion ===
Newbould was an advocate of Liberal reunion in the early 1920s, before the fall of the Lloyd George coalition. He co-hosted a function with John Wallace the Coalition Liberal MP for Dunfermline Burghs in June 1921 attended by about 40 MPs from both sides of the Liberal divide with the aim of stimulating the process of reunion. It was not a gathering which had the approval or endorsement of either the Independent or Coalition Liberal headquarters but an opportunity for individuals from both wings of the party to re-affirm their beliefs in Liberalism as a creed and to make public statements in support of traditional Liberal policies such as Free Trade, Ireland and the economy. However a few weeks later this particular movement towards reconciliation within the Liberal family foundered, mainly as a result of the Independent Liberals' fear that their approaches would be viewed as a willingness to become formally associated with Lloyd George and their determination to let it be known that they could not contemplate the possibility that Lloyd George might one day lead the party again.

=== Other Parliamentary contests ===
Newbould lost his seat at Leyton West in 1922 to Conservative candidate James Cassels in a three-cornered contest, with Labour candidate Alfred Smith (later MP for Sunderland from 1929 to 1931) also entering the fray. He tried to win it back at the next opportunity in 1923 again facing a three-cornered contest with Cassels and Smith and came agonisingly close to regaining the seat, Cassels holding on by a majority of 64 votes (or 0.2% of the poll). Newbould fought Leyton West again in 1924 but this time came third in the poll behind the victorious Cassels and Smith in second place. He did not stand for Parliament again.

=== Other Liberal activity ===
In 1927 he was nominated by the London Liberal Federation to sit on a committee of the Liberal Party under the chairmanship of Lord Buxton, to look into the organisation and health of the party in London constituencies.

In 1928 he stood unsuccessfully for the Liberals in the Hackney North constituency at the London County Council elections.

== Death ==
Newbould died at Ferring-by-Sea in West Sussex, where he had his home, at age 78 on 25 April 1952.

Parliament of the United Kingdom
Preceded by Harry Wrightson	Member of Parliament for Leyton West; 1919–1922	Succeeded by James Cassels
