= 1926 Smethwick by-election =

UK parliamentary by-election won by Oswald Mosley

The 1926 Smethwick by-election was a by-election held on 21 December 1926 for the British House of Commons constituency of Smethwick in Staffordshire (now in the West Midlands county).

The by-election was caused by the resignation of the town's Labour Party Member of Parliament (MP), John Davison, who had represented the constituency since its creation for the 1918 general election.

The result was a victory for the Labour candidate Oswald Mosley, who held the seat comfortably with a slightly increased share of the vote. He represented Smethwick until the 1931 general election, having left Labour in early 1931 to found the New Party. The New Party was unsuccessful, and the following year he founded the British Union of Fascists.

== Result ==
By-election 1926: Smethwick
Party	Candidate	Votes	%	±%
Labour	Oswald Mosley	16,077	57.1	+4.8
Conservative	M.J. Pike	9,495	33.7	−14.0
Liberal	Edwin Bayliss	2,600	9.2	New
Majority		6,582	23.4	+18.8
Turnout		35,862	78.6	+0.4
Labour hold		Swing	9.4	

== See also ==
- List of United Kingdom by-elections (1918–1931)
- Smethwick constituency
- 1945 Smethwick by-election
