= Patrick Gordon Walker =

British Labour politician (1907–1980)

The Right Honourable The Lord Gordon-Walker CH PC
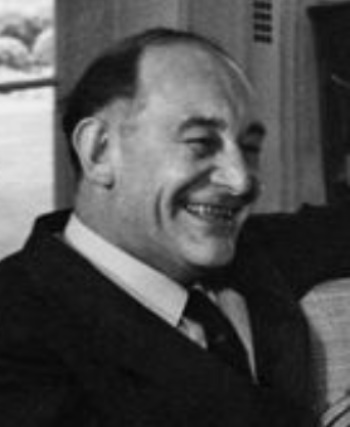
- Gordon Walker in 1963

Secretary of State for Education and Science
- In office 29 August 1967 – 6 April 1968
- Prime Minister: Harold Wilson
- Preceded by: Anthony Crosland
- Succeeded by: Edward Short

Minister without Portfolio
- In office 6 April 1966 – 29 August 1967
- Prime Minister: Harold Wilson
- Preceded by: Peter Carington
- Succeeded by: George Thomson

Secretary of State for Foreign Affairs
- In office 16 October 1964 – 22 January 1965
- Prime Minister: Harold Wilson
- Preceded by: Rab Butler
- Succeeded by: Michael Stewart

Secretary of State for Commonwealth Relations
- In office 28 February 1950 – 26 October 1951
- Prime Minister: Clement Attlee
- Preceded by: Philip Noel-Baker
- Succeeded by: The Lord Ismay

Under-Secretary of State for Commonwealth Relations
- In office 7 October 1947 – 28 February 1950
- Prime Minister: Clement Attlee
- Preceded by: Arthur Bottomley
- Succeeded by: Angus Holden

Member of the European Parliament for the United Kingdom
- In office 1975 – 1976
Shadow cabinet offices
Shadow Foreign Secretary
In office 28 February 1963 – 16 October 1964
Leader	Harold Wilson
Preceded by	Harold Wilson
Succeeded by	Rab Butler
Shadow Minister of Defence
In office 30 November 1961 – 28 February 1963
Leader	Hugh Gaitskell; George Brown
Preceded by	George Brown
Succeeded by	Denis Healey
Shadow Home Secretary
In office 24 January 1958 – 30 November 1961
Leader	Hugh Gaitskell
Preceded by	Kenneth Younger
Succeeded by	George Brown
Shadow President of the Board of Trade
In office 15 February 1956 – 24 January 1958
Leader	Hugh Gaitskell
Preceded by	Harold Wilson
Succeeded by	Dick Mitchison
Shadow Secretary of State for Commonwealth Relations
In office July 1955 – 15 February 1956
Leader	Hugh Gaitskell
Succeeded by	Arthur Creech Jones

Member of Parliament
- In office 31 March 1966 – 8 February 1974
- Preceded by: Ronald Buxton
- Succeeded by: Bryan Magee
- Constituency: Leyton
- In office 1 October 1945 – 25 September 1964
- Preceded by: Alfred Dobbs
- Succeeded by: Peter Griffiths
- Constituency: Smethwick

Personal details
- Born: Patrick Chrestien Gordon Walker; 7 April 1907 Worthing, Sussex, England
- Died: 2 December 1980 (aged 73) London, England
- Party: Labour
- Spouse: Audrey Muriel Rudolf (m. 1934)
- Children: 5
- Education: Christ Church, Oxford

Patrick Chrestien Gordon Walker, Baron Gordon-Walker, CH, PC (7 April 1907 – 2 December 1980) was a British Labour Party politician. He was a Member of Parliament for nearly 30 years and twice a cabinet minister. He lost his Smethwick parliamentary seat at the 1964 general election in a bitterly racial campaign conducted in the wake of local factory closures.

== Early life ==
Born in Worthing, Sussex, Gordon Walker was the son of Alan Lachlan Gordon Walker, a Scottish judge in the Indian Civil Service. He was educated at Wellington College and at Christ Church, Oxford, where he took a second in Modern History in 1928 and subsequently gained a B. Litt. He was a student (fellow) in history at Christ Church from 1931 until 1941.

From 1940 to 1944, Gordon Walker worked for the BBC's European Service, where from 1942 he arranged the BBC's daily broadcasts of the BBC German Service. In 1945, he worked as assistant director of the BBC's German Service working from Radio Luxembourg, travelling with the British forces. He broadcast about the liberation of the German concentration camp at Bergen-Belsen, and wrote a book on the subject called The Lid Lifts.

From 1946 to 1948, he was chairman of the British Film Institute.

== Political career ==
He first stood for parliament at the 1935 general election, when he was unsuccessful in the Conservative-held Oxford constituency.

In 1938, he was selected to stand again in the Oxford by-election. The Liberal Party had selected Ivor Davies, who offered to stand down from the by-election if Labour did the same and backed a Popular Front candidate against the Conservatives. Eventually, Gordon Walker reluctantly stood down and both parties supported Sandy Lindsay as an Independent Progressive. Quintin Hogg, the Conservative candidate, defeated Lindsay in the by-election.

Gordon Walker did not contest the 1945 general election, but was elected later in 1945 as member of Parliament (MP) for Smethwick in a by-election on 1 October 1945 after Labour's Alfred Dobbs was killed in a car accident the day after winning the seat at the 1945 general election. After the by-election, Gordon Walker's support in the constituency gradually declined.

Once in parliament, Gordon Walker was promoted rapidly through the ranks of Clement Attlee's Labour government. In 1946, he was appointed a parliamentary private secretary (PPS) to Herbert Morrison, the leader of the House of Commons. From 1947 to 1950, he was a parliamentary under-secretary of state at the Commonwealth Relations Office, and in 1950 he joined the cabinet as Secretary of state for Commonwealth relations, serving until Labour's defeat at the 1951 general election.

As Commonwealth secretary in 1950, Gordon Walker persuaded the cabinet to agree to prevent Seretse Khama, the heir to the throne of the British protectorate of Bechuanaland, from becoming its king, on the grounds that he had married a white English woman, Ruth Williams, an inter-racial marriage that had upset Bechuanaland's neighbouring state, apartheid South Africa.

Khama had been brought to Britain by the government under false pretences, ostensibly to talk about his future, and at Gordon Walker's behest he was then prevented from returning to his homeland for five years, subsequently increased to a lifetime ban (although eventually rescinded by a later, Conservative, government). Khama said the unexpected and earth shattering news of his exile was given to him by Gordon Walker in an "unemotional" and "unfeeling" manner. "I doubt that any man has been asked to give up his birthright in such cold, calculating terms", he said.

In opposition from 1951, Gordon Walker disagreed with the Labour leadership's stance on the Federation of Rhodesia and Nyasaland. This led Gordon Walker to remain outside the Shadow Cabinet. He re-joined the front bench in 1955 and was successful in the Labour Party Shadow Cabinet elections in 1956, as he was to be in every year until 1963 (the last before Labour returned to government). In opposition, Gordon Walker was a close ally of the Labour Leader Hugh Gaitskell, and briefly considered standing for the leadership after Gaitskell's death in January 1963.

Following the 1964 general election, after a successful career in opposition, Gordon Walker became foreign secretary in the Labour government; he had held the shadow role for the previous year. Gordon Walker had signalled that Labour would represent continuity in foreign policy; he set out in an article in the American journal Foreign Affairs that Labour in office would remain committed to NATO and to Britain's global role. In office, the new Labour government made the decision to continue with the Polaris (UK nuclear programme); the decision was taken at a Cabinet committee by Harold Wilson, Denis Healey (the Secretary of State for Defence) and Gordon Walker.

Although Labour did win the 1964 election to end 13 years of Conservative rule, Gordon Walker was defeated in controversial circumstances by the Conservative candidate, Peter Griffiths. Smethwick had been a focus of immigration from the Commonwealth but the economic and industrial growth of the years following the Second World War were coupled with local factory closures, an ageing population and a lack of modern housing. Griffiths ran a campaign critical of the opposition's, and the government's, policies, including immigration policies. Griffiths' supporters made wide use of the slogan "If you want a nigger neighbour, vote Liberal or Labour". Griffiths did not accept that he had invented the slogan, but steadfastly refused to condemn it.

Despite, therefore, not being an MP or peer able to answer to Parliament, Gordon Walker was appointed to the Foreign Office by Harold Wilson. To resolve this unusual situation, he stood for the normally "safe" Labour constituency of Leyton in the Leyton by-election in January 1965; however, he lost, and was finally forced to resign as foreign secretary. After a sabbatical conducting research in Southeast Asia, he finally won Leyton in the 1966 general election. Following this election, he sat in the cabinet in 1967–68, first as minister without portfolio, then as secretary of state for education and science. He was involved in controversy on the plan for Enfield Grammar School to become a comprehensive and then later in 1967 on the postponement (on cost grounds) of raising the school leaving age to sixteen. The following April, after seven months in the role, Harold Wilson asked for his resignation. After leaving cabinet in 1968, he was appointed a Member of the Order of the Companions of Honour.

Gordon Walker retired from the House of Commons at the February 1974 general election. On 4 July that year, he was made a life peer as Baron Gordon-Walker, of Leyton in Greater London, in 1974 and was briefly a member of the European Parliament.

== Personal life ==
In 1934 he married Audrey Muriel Rudolf. They subsequently had twin sons and three daughters. Lord Gordon-Walker died in London in 1980, aged 73. He was found dead in the back of a taxi arriving at the Palace of Westminster.

== Bibliography ==
- Gordon Walker, P. C. (1937). "Capitalism and the Reformation". Economic History Review.
- Gordon Walker, P. C. (1939). An Outline of Man's History. London: N.C.L.C. Publishing Society.
- Restatement of Liberty. London: Hutchinson. 1951.
- The Lid Lifts: An Account of the Author's Experiences During Two Visits to Occupied Germany in the Spring of 1945. London: Victor Gollancz Ltd. 1945.
- The Commonwealth. London: Secker & Warburg. 1962.
- The Cabinet. London: Cape. 1970. ISBN 0-224-61819-9.
- Robert Pearce, ed. (c. 1991). Patrick Gordon Walker: Political Diaries 1932–1971. London: Historians' Press. ISBN 1-872273-05-X.

== Sources ==
- Leigh Rayment's Historical List of MPs
- Craig, F. W. S. (1983) [1969]. British parliamentary election results 1918–1949 (3rd ed.). Chichester: Parliamentary Research Services. ISBN 0-900178-06-X.
- Griffiths, P. (1966). A Question of Colour. The Smethwick Election of 1964. London: Leslie Frewin.
- Pearce, R. (2004) "Gordon Walker, Patrick Chrestien, Baron Gordon-Walker (1907–1980)", Oxford Dictionary of National Biography, Oxford University Press, accessed 26 August 2007 (subscription, Wikipedia Library access or UK public library membership required)
- Prem, D. R. (1965). Parliamentary Leper: A History of Colour Prejudice in Britain. Metric Publications/Aligarh University Press.

Parliament of the United Kingdom
Preceded by Alfred Dobbs	Member of Parliament for Smethwick; 1945–1964	Succeeded by Peter Griffiths
Preceded by Ronald Buxton	Member of Parliament for Leyton; 1966 – 1974	Succeeded by Bryan Magee
Political offices
Preceded by Philip Noel-Baker	Secretary of State for Commonwealth Relations; 1950–1951	Succeeded by The Lord Ismay
Preceded by Kenneth Younger	Shadow Home Secretary; 1957–1962	Succeeded by George Brown
Preceded by Harold Wilson	Shadow Foreign Secretary; 1963–1964	Succeeded by Rab Butler
Preceded by Rab Butler	Secretary of State for Foreign Affairs; 1964–1965	Succeeded by Michael Stewart
Preceded by Peter Carington	Minister without Portfolio; 1966–1967	Succeeded by George Thomson
Preceded by Tony Crosland	Secretary of State for Education and Science; 1967–1968	Succeeded by Edward Short
