= Ronald Buxton (British politician) =

British politician, businessman and engineer

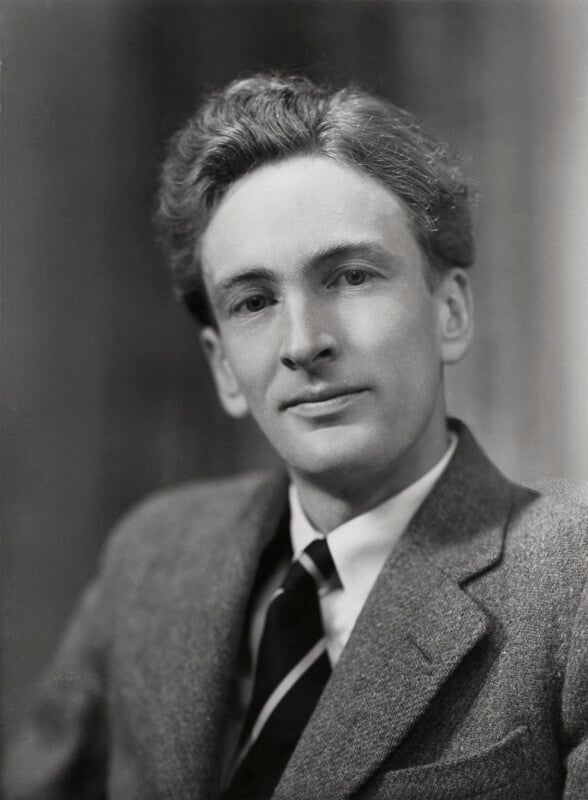
- Buxton in 1952

Member of Parliament for Leyton
- In office 21 January 1965 – 10 March 1966
- Preceded by: Reginald Sorensen
- Succeeded by: Patrick Gordon Walker

Personal details
- Born: Ronald Carlile Buxton; 20 August 1923
- Died: 10 January 2017 (aged 93)
- Party: Conservative
- Spouse: Phyllida (m. 1959)
- Children: 4
- Education: Eton College
- Alma mater: Trinity College, Cambridge (MA)

Military service
- Branch/service: British Army
- Rank: Captain
- Battles/wars: World War II

Ronald Carlile Buxton MC (20 August 1923 – 10 January 2017) was a chartered structural engineer, businessman, and Conservative Party politician in the United Kingdom.

Buxton came to national attention after a spectacular showing at the 1965 Leyton by-election, which he won unexpectedly, prompting Sir Alec Douglas-Home to declare "The best epitaph on a hundred days of socialist government...my friend the member for Leyton." The unconcealed joy was not to last; he was a Member of Parliament for a little over a year, losing his seat at the 1966 general election.

== Early life and background ==
Buxton was the son of British Army officer Captain Murray Buxton and Janet, daughter of Sir Edward Carlile, 1st Baronet, a former MP for St Albans. Buxton was educated at Eton and, after fighting in India during World War II (reaching the rank of captain in the REME and receiving the MC), went up to Trinity College, Cambridge, in 1945, taking an MA.

== Political career ==
Buxton was the Conservative candidate in the safe Labour constituency of Leyton at the 1955 general election, losing by 8,244 votes to the long-serving Labour MP Reginald Sorensen. He was unsuccessful again at the 1959 election and at the October 1964 general election, when Sorensen's majority was 7,926 votes. Buxton had cast around for another seat but was refused the nomination for the constituency where he lived, and failed to secure the Conservative nomination for South-West Norfolk.

Shortly after the 1964 election, Sorensen was persuaded to accept a life peerage to make way in a safe seat for the Foreign Secretary Patrick Gordon Walker, who had lost his seat in Smethwick. However, the plan failed and on 21 January Buxton won the 1965 Leyton by-election by a narrow margin of only 205 votes, on a reduced turnout. David Dimbleby, later to become the anchor (from 1979) of the BBC Election results programmes, reported the result live from a snowy Leyton Town Hall for the BBC.

Gordon Walker regained the seat for Labour at the 1966 general election, with a comfortable majority. Buxton stood again at the 1970 election, but lost again, by over 5,000 votes.

== Professional life ==
Buxton joined the steel construction company H. Young & Co. as an engineer, and eventually became the firm's chairman. In East Africa he built a bridge across a deep creek at Mtwapa north of Mombasa, and for a while collected the tolls himself but decided to sell it. He identified with British settlers in Africa, and at the 1958 Conservative Party Conference asked that their position be safeguarded in independence negotiations.

In July the same year he nearly died when flying his own plane to Kenya, becoming lost in a storm between Sicily and Libya with low fuel. He spotted a tanker, put a note in his shoe and dropped it on to the deck. When the engine died, the plane dropped into the sea and the crew rescued him from the water. This experience did not deter him from flying.

== Personal life ==
He married on 20 June 1959, his distant cousin Phyllida, daughter of Captain Roden Henry Victor Buxton and Dorothy St John. They had four children:

- Peter Hildred Buxton (1960-)
- Camilla Jane Buxton (1960-)
- Vanessa Ann Buxton (1962-)
- Robert Victor Buxton (1966-)

Buxton purchased Kimberley Hall, Wymondham, Norfolk- still owned by the Buxton family- in 1958. It had been due for demolition. Buxton aimed to restore it to some grandeur, but not before evicting from residence a rare colony of English bats. (Note: Horseshoe and Pipistrelle species.)

Buxton died on 10 January 2017 at the age of 93.

== Notes ==
Parliament of the United Kingdom
Preceded by Reginald Sorensen	Member of Parliament for Leyton; 1965–1966	Succeeded by Patrick Gordon Walker
