= Leyton (constituency) =

Parliamentary constituency in the United Kingdom, 1950–1997

- Former borough constituency for the House of Commons
- Borough: London Borough of Waltham Forest

1950–1997
- Seats: 1
- Created from: Leyton East and Leyton West
- Replaced by: Leyton and Wanstead

Leyton was a parliamentary constituency in the United Kingdom, centred on the town of Leyton in North-East London. It returned one Member of Parliament (MP) to the House of Commons of the Parliament of the United Kingdom, elected by the first-past-the-post system.

== History ==
The constituency was created for the 1950 general election, and abolished for the 1997 general election, when it was partly replaced by the new Leyton and Wanstead constituency.

In 1991, Leyton was 62% White, 15.3% Asian and 17.9% Black.

== Boundaries ==
1950–1974: The Municipal Borough of Leyton. Note: abolished 1965. Remained same zone in successor: London Borough of Waltham Forest.

1974–1983: The London Borough of Waltham Forest wards of Cann Hall, Central, Forest, Lea Bridge, Leyton, and Leytonstone.

1983–1997: The London Borough of Waltham Forest wards of Cann Hall, Cathall, Forest, Grove Green, Lea Bridge, Leyton, and Leytonstone.

== Members of Parliament ==
Election	Member	Party	Notes
1950	Reginald Sorensen	Labour	Resigned December 1964 on being raised to the peerage
1965 by-election	Ronald Buxton	Conservative	
1966	Patrick Gordon Walker	Labour	Previously MP for Smethwick 1945-1964
February 1974	Bryan Magee	Labour	
1982	Bryan Magee	SDP	
1983	Harry Cohen	Labour	
1997	constituency abolished: see Leyton and Wanstead		

== Elections ==
=== Elections in the 1950s ===
General election 1950: Leyton
Party	Candidate	Votes	%	±%
Labour	Reginald Sorensen	35,702	54.59	
Conservative	Peter Williams	24,052	36.77	
Liberal	Cyril Oliver Appleton	5,650	8.64	
Majority		11,650	17.72	
Turnout		65,404	83.33	
Registered electors		78,491		
Labour win (new seat)				

General election 1951: Leyton
Party	Candidate	Votes	%	±%
Labour	Reginald Sorensen	37,728	57.78	+3.19
Conservative	Peter Williams	27,563	42.22	+5.45
Majority		10,165	15.56	−2.14
Turnout		65,291	82.18	−1.15
Registered electors		79,445		
Labour hold		Swing	-1.13	

General election 1955: Leyton
Party	Candidate	Votes	%	±%
Labour	Reginald Sorensen	29,747	53.40	−4.78
Conservative	Ronald Buxton	21,543	38.67	−3.55
Liberal	Evan Laurence Frederick Richards	4,421	7.94	−New
Majority		8,204	14.73	−0.84
Turnout		55,711	74.34	−7.84
Registered electors		79,944		
Labour hold		Swing	-0.62	

General election 1959: Leyton
Party	Candidate	Votes	%	±%
Labour	Reginald Sorensen	28,367	53.71	+0.31
Conservative	Ronald Buxton	24,448	46.29	+7.62
Majority		3,919	7.42	−7.31
Turnout		52,815	74.39	+0.05
Registered electors		70,996		
Labour hold		Swing	-3.7	

=== Elections in the 1960s ===
General election 1964: Leyton
Party	Candidate	Votes	%	±%
Labour	Reginald Sorensen	23,640	50.35	−3.36
Conservative	Ronald Buxton	15,714	33.47	−12.82
Liberal	Alistair Mackay	7,598	16.18	New
Majority		7,926	16.88	+9.46
Turnout		46,592	70.18	−4.21
Registered electors		66,905		
Labour hold		Swing	-3.36	

By-election, 21 Jan 1965
Party	Candidate	Votes	%	±%
Conservative	Ronald Buxton	16,544	42.88	+9.41
Labour	Patrick Gordon Walker	16,339	42.36	−8.00
Liberal	Alistair Mackay	5,382	13.95	−2.23
UK & Commonwealth Party	Jeremiah Lynch	157	0.41	New
Disarmament	George Delf	156	0.40	New
Majority		205	0.52	N/A
Turnout		38,578	57.70	−12.48
Conservative gain from Labour		Swing	+8.71	

General election 1966: Leyton
Party	Candidate	Votes	%	±%
Labour	Patrick Gordon Walker	26,803	54.42	+4.07
Conservative	Ronald Buxton	18,157	36.87	+3.40
Liberal	Alistair Mackay	3,851	7.82	−8.36
Independent Labour	William Hanley	441	0.90	New
Majority		8,646	17.55	+0.67
Turnout		49,252	76.09	+4.91
Registered electors		64,727		
Labour hold		Swing	+0.34	

=== Elections in the 1970s ===
General election 1970: Leyton
Party	Candidate	Votes	%	±%
Labour	Patrick Gordon Walker	23,386	56.64	+2.22
Conservative	Ronald Buxton	17,906	43.36	+6.49
Majority		5,480	13.28	−4.27
Turnout		41,292	61.99	−14.10
Registered electors		66,610		
Labour hold		Swing	-2.14	

General election February 1974: Leyton
Party	Candidate	Votes	%	±%
Labour	Bryan Magee	22,785	49.07	−7.57
Conservative	Barry Dare	12,848	27.67	−15.69
Liberal	Timothy Brown	8,707	18.75	New
National Front	Sherri Bothwell	2,097	4.52	New
Majority		9,937	21.40	+8.12
Turnout		46,437	72.66	+10.67
Registered electors		63,909		
Labour hold		Swing	+4.06	

General election October 1974: Leyton
Party	Candidate	Votes	%	±%
Labour	Bryan Magee	22,130	54.88	+5.82
Conservative	Barry Dare	10,617	26.33	−1.34
Liberal	Ralph Scott	5,408	13.41	−5.34
National Front	Sherri Bothwell	2,168	5.38	+0.86
Majority		11,513	28.55	+7.15
Turnout		40,323	62.68	−9.98
Registered electors		64,328		
Labour hold		Swing	+3.58	

General election 1979: Leyton
Party	Candidate	Votes	%	±%
Labour	Bryan Magee	21,095	51.38	−3.50
Conservative	Anthony Cordle	15,361	37.41	+11.08
Liberal	Clyde Kitson	3,425	8.34	−5.07
National Front	Peter Pomery-Rudd	1,179	2.87	−2.51
Majority		5,734	13.97	−14.58
Turnout		41,060	69.39	+6.71
Registered electors		59,176		
Labour hold		Swing	-7.29	

=== Elections in the 1980s ===
General election 1983: Leyton
Party	Candidate	Votes	%	±%
Labour	Harry Cohen	16,504	43.5	−7.9
Conservative	Waldemar Neilson-Hansen	11,988	31.6	−5.8
SDP	Bryan Magee	9,448	24.9	N/A
Majority		4,516	11.9	−2.1
Turnout		37,940	65.7	−3.7
Registered electors		57,770		
Labour hold		Swing	-1.1	

General election 1987: Leyton
Party	Candidate	Votes	%	±%
Labour	Harry Cohen	16,536	41.21	−2.29
Liberal	Simon Banks	11,895	29.65	+4.75
Conservative	David Gilmartin	11,692	29.14	−2.46
Majority		4,641	11.56	−0.32
Turnout		40,123	69.58	+3.91
Registered electors		57,662		
Labour hold		Swing	-3.52	

=== Election in the 1990s ===
General election 1992: Leyton
Party	Candidate	Votes	%	±%
Labour	Harry Cohen	20,334	52.6	+11.4
Conservative	Christine Smith	8,882	23.0	−6.1
Liberal Democrats	Jonathan Fryer	8,180	21.18	−8.47
Liberal	Louis de Pinna	561	1.45	N/A
Green	Khalid Pervez	412	1.07	New
Natural Law	Richard Archer	256	0.66	New
Majority		11,452	29.64	+18.08
Turnout		38,625	67.44	−2.14
Registered electors		57,272		
Labour hold		Swing	+8.79	

== See also ==
- Parliamentary constituencies in London
