= 1945 Smethwick by-election =

UK parliamentary by-election

The 1945 Smethwick by-election was a by-election held on 1 October 1945 for the British House of Commons constituency of Smethwick in Staffordshire (now in the West Midlands county).

The by-election was caused by the death of the town's newly elected Labour Party Member of Parliament (MP), 63-year-old Alfred Dobbs, who was killed in a car accident on 27 July 1945, only one day after his election at the 1945 general election Apart from some MPs who were elected posthumously, Dobbs remains the United Kingdom's shortest-serving MP.

There were only two candidates in the by-election, Labour and Conservative; the Liberal Party had not fielded a candidate in Smethwick since the 1929 general election.

The result was a victory for the Labour candidate Patrick Gordon Walker, who held the seat comfortably with a slightly increased majority on a modestly reduced turnout. Gordon Walker was an MP for nearly 30 years, serving twice as a Cabinet minister.

== Votes ==
By-election 1945: Smethwick
Party	Candidate	Votes	%	±%
Labour	Patrick Gordon Walker	19,364	68.8	+2.9
Conservative	G.H. Edgar	8,762	31.2	−2.9
Majority		10,602	37.6	+5.8
Turnout		43,020	65.4	−7.0
Labour hold		Swing	+2.9	

== See also ==
- List of United Kingdom by-elections
- Smethwick constituency
- 1926 Smethwick by-election
