= Harry Wrightson =

British politician

Harry Wrightson (1874 – 29 January 1919) was a British Conservative politician. He was elected Member of Parliament (MP) for Leyton West in the 1918 General Election, but died before Parliament met.

== Early life ==
Wrightson was born in 1874, the son of Reverend William Garmondsway Wrightson of The Old Hall, Hurworth-on-Tees. He was educated at Windlesham House School from 1885 to 1888 and afterwards at Marlborough College.

In 1901 he married Helen Western with whom he had four sons and a daughter.

== Military service ==
Wrightson was commissioned into the 1st City of London Artillery Volunteer Corps in 1900. In 1917, during the First World War, he was promoted from a retired second lieutenant directly to lieutenant-colonel and given command of the Essex Motor Volunteer Corps, a unit formed of vehicle-owning volunteers.

== Civilian and political career ==
In civilian life, Wrightson was an insurance underwriter and broker for Lloyd's of London.

He was elected Conservative MP for Leyton West in the 1918 General Election. Within days of the declaration, Wrightson contracted influenza, which deteriorated to pneumonia, and he died early in 1919, aged 44, six days before the new Parliament met. It is likely he was a victim of the Spanish flu pandemic. He thus became one of only a handful of elected British MPs never to have taken their seats.

== Death ==
Wrightson died in his flat in Westminster on 29 January 1919.

== See also ==
- List of United Kingdom MPs with the shortest service

Parliament of the United Kingdom
| New constituency | Member of Parliament for Leyton West; 1918–1919 | Succeeded by Alfred Ernest Newbould |
