= Glasgow parliamentary constituencies =

The Scottish Parliamentary electoral region of Glasgow shown within Scotland.

The city of Glasgow, located in Scotland, UK, is represented in both the Westminster Parliament in London, and the Scottish Parliament in Holyrood, Edinburgh. At Westminster, it is represented by six Members of Parliament (MPs), all elected to represent individual constituencies at least once every five years, using the first-past-the-post system of voting. In Holyrood, Glasgow is represented by sixteen MSPs, nine of whom are elected to represent individual constituencies once every five years using first-past-the-post, and seven of whom are elected as additional members, through proportional representation.

The current Westminster constituencies have been in use since the 2024 General Election, and those currently used at Holyrood were implemented following a boundary review in 2011. At Westminster, six MPs representing Glasgow constituencies belong to the Labour Party. Prior to the 2024 general election, all of Glasgow's seven MPs were representatives of the Scottish National Party. In Holyrood, following elections in May 2021, all nine Glasgow constituency seats are currently held by the Scottish National Party. Four Labour members, as well as two from the Conservative party and one from the Green Party, were also elected from the Glasgow regional list.

== Westminster constituencies ==
- Table as after the 2019 United Kingdom general election:

Name	Majority (Note: The majority is the number of votes the winning candidate receives more than their nearest rival.)	Member of Parliament	Nearest opposition	Areas Covered	Map
Glasgow Central	6,474	Alison Thewliss	Faten Hameed	Anderston, Bellahouston, Blythswood Hill, Bridgeton, Calton, Camlachie, Cowcaddens, Charing Cross, Dalmarnock, Finnieston, Garnethill, Garrowhill, Gorbals, Hutchesontown, Laurieston, Merchant City, Park District, Ruchill, Strathbungo, Townhead	
Glasgow East	5,566	David Linden	Kate Watson	Auchenshuggle, Baillieston, Barlanark, Barrowfield, Braidfauld, Budhill, Carmyle, Craigend, Cranhill, Easterhouse, Garthamlock, Greenfield, Lightburn, Lilybank, Mount Vernon, Newbank, Parkhead, Queenslie, Sandyhills, Shettleston, Springboig, Springhill, Tollcross	
Glasgow North	5,601	Patrick Grady	Pam Duncan-Glancy	Botany, Dowanhill, High Ruchill, Hillhead, Hyndland, Kelvinbridge, Kelvindale, Kelvinside, Lambhill, Maryhill, Woodlands, Woodside, Wyndford, Yorkhill	
Glasgow North East	2,548	Anne McLaughlin	Paul Sweeney	Balornock, Barmulloch, Blackhill, Blochairn, Carntyne, Cowlairs, Dennistoun, Germiston, Haghill, Hamiltonhill, Hogganfield, Millerston, Milton, Possilpark, Provanmill, Riddrie, Robroyston, Royston, Ruchazie, Sighthill, Springburn,	
Glasgow North West	8,359	Carol Monaghan	Patricia Ferguson	Anniesland, Blairdardie, Broomhill, Drumchapel, Garscadden, Jordanhill, Knightswood, Netherton, Partick, Scotstoun, Temple, Thornwood, Whiteinch, Yoker	
Glasgow South	9,005	Stewart McDonald	Johann Lamont	Auldhouse, Battlefield, Carmunnock, Carnwadric, Castlemilk, Cathcart, Croftfoot, Crosshill, Crossmyloof, Hillpark, Kennishead, King's Park, Langside, Mansewood, Mount Florida, Muirend, Newlands, Pollokshaws, Polmadie, Priesthill, Queen's Park, Simshill, Tradeston	
Glasgow South West	4,900	Chris Stephens	Matt Kerr	Arden, Cardonald, Cessnock, Corkerhill, Cowglen, Craigton, Darnley, Deaconsbank, Drumoyne, Govan, Halfway, Hillington, Hurlet, Ibrox, Jenny Lind, Linthouse, Mosspark, Pollok, Pollokshields, Shawlands, Southpark, Toryglen,	

== Holyrood constituencies ==
- Current (since 2011)
  - Glasgow Anniesland
  - Glasgow Cathcart
  - Glasgow Kelvin
  - Glasgow Maryhill and Springburn
  - Glasgow Pollok
  - Glasgow Provan
  - Glasgow Shettleston
  - Glasgow Southside
- Historic (1999 to 2007)
  - Glasgow Baillieston
  - Glasgow Govan
  - Glasgow Maryhill
  - Glasgow Springburn
  - Glasgow Rutherglen·
- Elections
  - 1999
  - 2003
  - 2007
  - 2011
  - 2016
  - 2021

== Historical representation ==
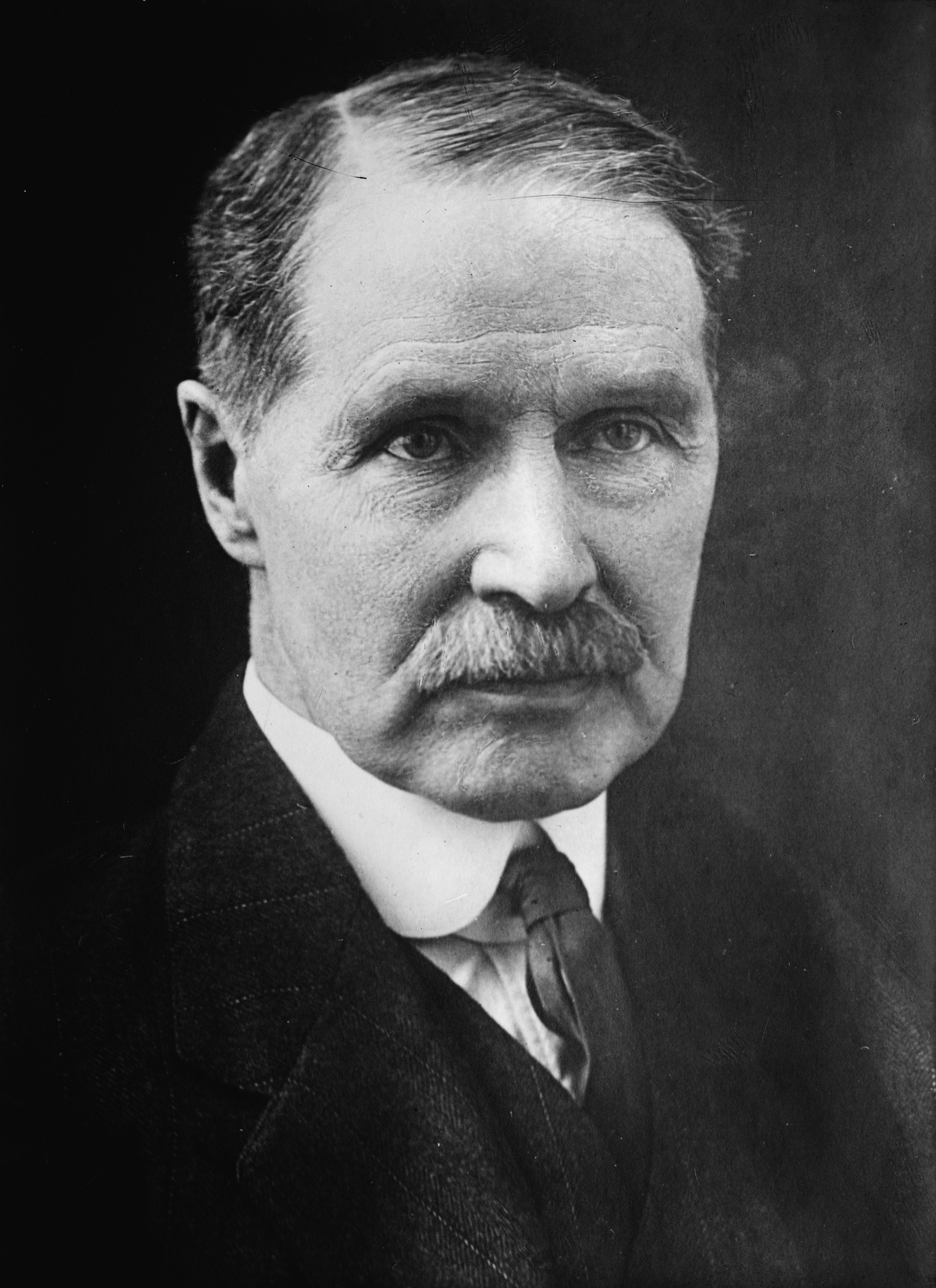
Bonar Law was Prime Minister of the UK from 1922 to 1923 and was the Conservative MP for Glasgow Central from 1918 to 1923.

=== 1708–1801 ===
- Clyde Burghs – Burgh constituency which elected one MP to Westminster.

=== 1832–1885 ===
- Glasgow – Burgh constituency which elected two MPs to Westminster from 1832 to 1868, and then three members from 1868 to 1885.

=== 1885–1918 ===
- Glasgow Blackfriars and Hutchesontown
- Glasgow Bridgeton
- Glasgow Camlachie
- Glasgow College
- Glasgow Central
- Glasgow St Rollox
- Glasgow Tradeston

=== 1918–1950 ===
George Nicoll Barnes was leader of the Labour Party 1910–11 and a Glasgow MP 1906–22.

- Glasgow Bridgeton
- Glasgow Camlachie
- Glasgow Cathcart
- Glasgow Central
- Glasgow Gorbals
- Glasgow Govan
- Glasgow Hillhead
- Glasgow Kelvingrove
- Glasgow Maryhill
- Glasgow Partick
- Glasgow Pollok
- Glasgow St. Rollox
- Glasgow Shettleston
- Glasgow Springburn
- Glasgow Tradeston

=== 1950–1955 ===
- Glasgow Bridgeton
- Glasgow Camlachie
- Glasgow Cathcart
- Glasgow Central
- Glasgow Gorbals
- Glasgow Govan
- Glasgow Hillhead
- Glasgow Kelvingrove
- Glasgow Maryhill
- Glasgow Pollok
- Glasgow Scotstoun
- Glasgow Shettleston
- Glasgow Springburn
- Glasgow Tradeston
- Glasgow Woodside

=== 1955–1974 ===
- Glasgow Bridgeton
- Glasgow Cathcart
- Glasgow Central
- Glasgow Gorbals
- Glasgow Govan
- Glasgow Hillhead
- Glasgow Kelvingrove
- Glasgow Maryhill
- Glasgow Pollok
- Glasgow Provan
- Glasgow Scotstoun
- Glasgow Shettleston
- Glasgow Springburn
- Glasgow Tradeston
- Glasgow Woodside

=== 1974–1983 ===
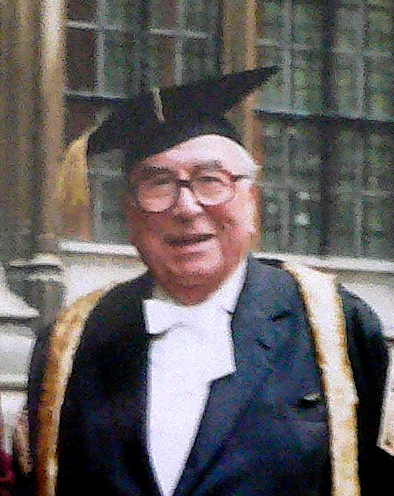
Roy Jenkins was a founder of the SDP and the MP for Glasgow Hillhead 1982–87.

- Glasgow Cathcart
- Glasgow Central
- Glasgow Craigton
- Glasgow Garscadden
- Glasgow Govan
- Glasgow Hillhead
- Glasgow Kelvingrove
- Glasgow Maryhill
- Glasgow Pollok
- Glasgow Provan
- Glasgow Queen's Park
- Glasgow Shettleston
- Glasgow Springburn

=== 1983–1997 (11 MPs) ===
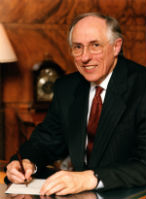
Donald Dewar was the inaugural First Minister of Scotland (1999–2000), and a Labour MP in Glasgow from 1978 until his death in 2000. His statue stands in Buchanan Street, Glasgow.

Labour SNP SDP

Constituency	1983	1987	1988	1989	1992
Glasgow Cathcart	Maxton				
Glasgow Central	McTaggart			Watson	
Glasgow Garscadden	Dewar				
Glasgow Govan	Millan		Sillars		Davidson
Glasgow Hillhead	Jenkins	Galloway			
Glasgow Maryhill	Craigen	Fyfe			
Glasgow Pollok	White	Dunnachie			
Glasgow Provan	Brown	Wray			
Glasgow Rutherglen	Mackenzie	McAvoy			
Glasgow Shettleston	Marshall				
Glasgow Springburn	Martin				

=== 1997–2005 (10 MPs) ===
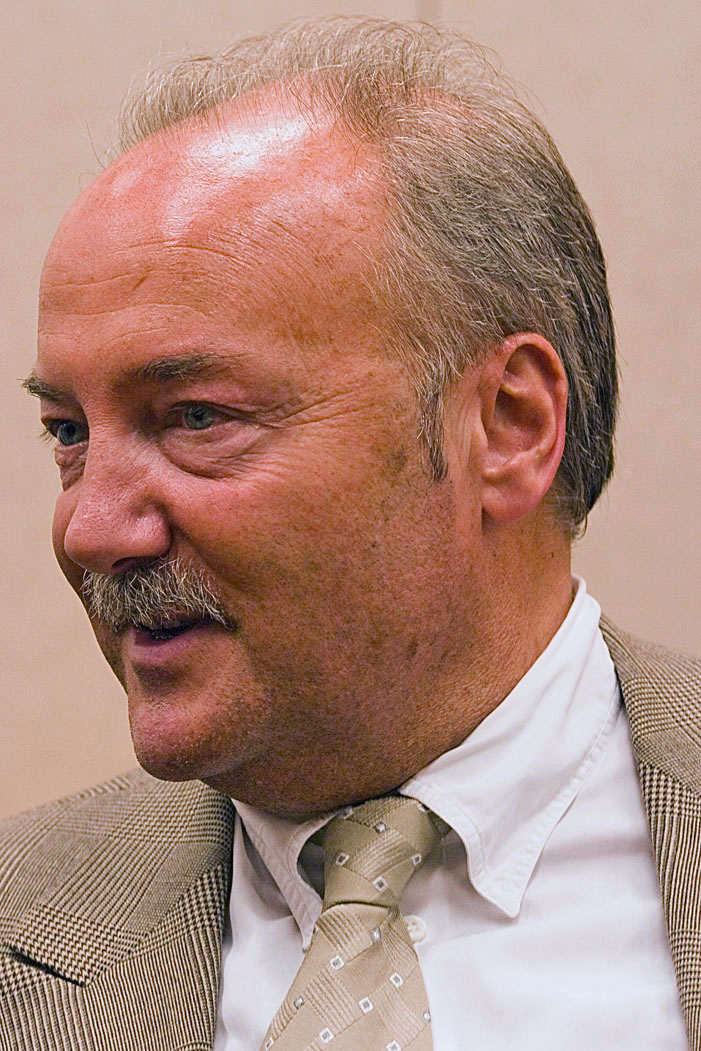
George Galloway was a Labour MP in Glasgow from 1987 to 2005. He was leader of the Respect Party and later MP for Bradford West.

Labour Respect Speaker

Constituency	1997	1997	1999	2000	2001	2003	2004
Glasgow Anniesland	Dewar			Robertson			
Glasgow Baillieston	Wray						
Glasgow Cathcart	Maxton				Harris		
Glasgow Govan	Sarwar	→	→				
Glasgow Kelvin	Galloway					→	→
Glasgow Maryhill	Fyfe				McKechin		
Glasgow Pollok	Davidson						
Glasgow Rutherglen (Note: Vast majority of constituency was outwith Glasgow City Council area following 1995 reorganisation.)	McAvoy						
Glasgow Shettleston	Marshall						
Glasgow Springburn	Martin			→			

These constituencies were also used in the Scottish Parliament (1999–2011).

=== 2005 – 2024 (7 MPs) ===
Labour SNP Speaker

Constituency	2005	2008	2009	2010	2015	2015	2017	2019
Glasgow Central	Sarwar			Sarwar	Thewliss			
Glasgow East	Marshall	Mason		Curran	McGarry	→	Linden	
Glasgow North	McKechin				Grady			
Glasgow North East	Martin		Bain		McLaughlin		Sweeney	McLaughlin
Glasgow North West	Robertson				Monaghan			
Glasgow South	Harris				McDonald			
Glasgow South West	Davidson				Stephens			

=== 2024 – present (6 MPs) ===
Labour

Constituency	2024
Glasgow North	Rhodes
Glasgow North East	Burke
Glasgow East	Grady
Glasgow South	McKee
Glasgow South West	Ahmed
Glasgow West	Ferguson

== See also ==
- Glasgow City Council
- Glasgow (European Parliament constituency)
- Politics of Glasgow
- Wards of Glasgow
