= List of MPs who lost their seat in the 2015 United Kingdom general election =

This is a list of MPs who lost their seat at the 2015 general election.

| Party | Name | Constituency | Office held whilst in power | Year elected | Defeated by | Party |
|---|---|---|---|---|---|---|
| Labour | The Right Honourable; Douglas Alexander | Paisley and Renfrewshire South | Shadow Foreign Secretary | 1997 | Mhairi Black | SNP |
| Labour | Willie Bain | Glasgow North East | Shadow Minister for Scotland (2010–13) | 2009 | Anne McLaughlin | SNP |
| Labour | The Right Honourable; Ed Balls | Morley and Outwood | Shadow Chancellor of the Exchequer | 2005 | Andrea Jenkyns | Conservative |
| Labour | Gordon Banks | Ochil and South Perthshire | Shadow Minister for Scotland | 2005 | Tasmina Ahmed-Sheikh | SNP |
| Labour | Dame Anne Begg | Aberdeen South | Chairwoman of the Work and Pensions Select Committee | 1997 | Callum McCaig | SNP |
| Labour | Russell Brown | Dumfries and Galloway | Shadow Minister for International Security Strategy | 1997 | Richard Arkless | SNP |
| Labour | Katy Clark | North Ayrshire and Arran | | 2005 | Patricia Gibson | SNP |
| Labour | The Right Honourable; Tom Clarke | Coatbridge, Chryston and Bellshill | | 1982 | Phil Boswell | SNP |
| Labour | Michael Connarty | Linlithgow and East Falkirk | | 1992 | Martyn Day | SNP |
| Labour | Margaret Curran | Glasgow East | Shadow Secretary of State for Scotland | 2010 | Natalie McGarry | SNP |
| Labour | Ian Davidson | Glasgow South West | Chairman of the Scottish Affairs Select Committee | 2005 | Chris Stephens | SNP |
| Labour | Thomas Docherty | Dunfermline and West Fife | Shadow Deputy Leader of the House of Commons | 2010 | Douglas Chapman | SNP |
| Labour | Brian Donohoe | Central Ayrshire | | 1992 | Philippa Whitford | SNP |
| Labour | Gemma Doyle | West Dunbartonshire | Shadow Minister for Defence Personnel, Welfare and Veterans | 2010 | Martin Docherty | SNP |
| Labour | Sheila Gilmore | Edinburgh East | | 2010 | Tommy Sheppard | SNP |
| Labour | Tom Greatrex | Rutherglen and Hamilton West | Shadow Minister for Energy | 2010 | Margaret Ferrier | SNP |
| Labour | Tom Harris | Glasgow South | Shadow Minister for the Environment | 2001 | Stewart McDonald | SNP |
| Labour | Julie Hilling | Bolton West | Shadow Lord Commissioner of the Treasury | 2010 | Chris Green | Conservative |
| Labour | Jimmy Hood | Lanark and Hamilton East | | 1987 | Angela Crawley | SNP |
| Labour | Cathy Jamieson | Kilmarnock and Loudoun | Shadow Economic Secretary | 2010 | Alan Brown | SNP |
| Labour | Mark Lazarowicz | Edinburgh North and Leith | Shadow Minister for International Development (2010–11) | 2001 | Deidre Brock | SNP |
| Labour | Michael McCann | East Kilbride, Strathaven and Lesmahagow | Chairman of the Scottish Parliamentary Labour Party | 2010 | Lisa Cameron | SNP |
| Labour | Gregg McClymont | Cumbernauld, Kilsyth and Kirkintilloch East | Shadow Minister for Pensions | 2010 | Stuart McDonald | SNP |
| Labour | Ann McKechin | Glasgow North | Shadow Undersecretary of State for Scotland (2010–11) | 2001 | Patrick Grady | SNP |
| Labour | Iain McKenzie | Inverclyde | | 2011 | Ronnie Cowan | SNP |
| Labour | Graeme Morrice | Livingston | Parliamentary private secretary to the Shadow Deputy Prime Minister | 2010 | Hannah Bardell | SNP |
| Labour | The Right Honourable; Jim Murphy | East Renfrewshire | Leader of the Scottish Labour Party | 1997 | Kirsten Oswald | SNP |
| Labour | Pamela Nash | Airdrie and Shotts | Baby of the House | 2010 | Neil Gray | SNP |
| Labour | Fiona O'Donnell | East Lothian | Shadow Minister for Environment, Food and Rural Affairs (2010–12) | 2010 | George Kerevan | SNP |
| Labour | Sandra Osborne | Ayr, Carrick and Cumnock | | 1997 | Corri Wilson | SNP |
| Labour | John Robertson | Glasgow North West | | 2000 | Carol Monaghan | SNP |
| Labour | Frank Roy | Motherwell and Wishaw | | 1997 | Marion Fellows | SNP |
| Labour | Chris Ruane | Vale of Clwyd | Parliamentary private secretary to the Shadow Secretary of State for Energy and Climate Change | 1997 | James Davies | Conservative |
| Labour | Anas Sarwar | Glasgow Central | Deputy Leader of the Scottish Labour Party (2011–14) | 2010 | Alison Thewliss | SNP |
| Labour | Andy Sawford | Corby | Shadow Minister for Communities and Local Government | 2012 | Tom Pursglove | Conservative |
| Labour | Alison Seabeck | Plymouth Moor View | Shadow Minister of State for Defence | 2005 | Johnny Mercer | Conservative |
| Labour | Jim Sheridan | Paisley and Renfrewshire North | | 2001 | Gavin Newlands | SNP |
| Labour | Chris Williamson | Derby North | Shadow Minister for Communities and Local Government (2010–13) | 2010 | Amanda Solloway | Conservative |
| Labour | David Wright | Telford | Shadow Lord Commissioner of the Treasury (2010–12) | 2001 | Lucy Allan | Conservative |
| Liberal Democrats | The Right Honourable; Danny Alexander | Inverness, Nairn, Badenoch and Strathspey | Chief Secretary to the Treasury | 2005 | Drew Hendry | SNP |
| Liberal Democrats | The Right Honourable; Norman Baker | Lewes | Minister of State for the Home Office (2013–14) | 1997 | Maria Caulfield | Conservative |
| Liberal Democrats | Gordon Birtwistle | Burnley | | 2010 | Julie Cooper | Labour |
| Liberal Democrats | The Right Honourable; Paul Burstow | Sutton and Cheam | Minister of State for Care Services (2010–12) | 1997 | Paul Scully | Conservative |
| Liberal Democrats | Lorely Burt | Solihull | Assistant Government Whip | 2005 | Julian Knight | Conservative |
| Liberal Democrats | The Right Honourable; Vince Cable | Twickenham | Secretary of State for Business, Innovation and Skills | 1997 | Tania Mathias | Conservative |
| Liberal Democrats | Michael Crockart | Edinburgh West | | 2010 | Michelle Thomson | SNP |
| Liberal Democrats | The Right Honourable; Ed Davey | Kingston and Surbiton | Secretary of State for Energy and Climate Change | 1997 | James Berry | Conservative |
| Liberal Democrats | The Right Honourable; Lynne Featherstone | Hornsey and Wood Green | Minister of State for the Home Office | 2005 | Catherine West | Labour |
| Liberal Democrats | Andrew George | St Ives | | 1997 | Derek Thomas | Conservative |
| Liberal Democrats | Steve Gilbert | St Austell and Newquay | Parliamentary private secretary to the Secretary of State for Energy and Climate Change | 2010 | Steve Double | Conservative |
| Liberal Democrats | Duncan Hames | Chippenham | Parliamentary private secretary to the Deputy Prime Minister | 2010 | Michelle Donelan | Conservative |
| Liberal Democrats | Sir Nick Harvey | North Devon | Minister of State for the Armed Forces (2010–12) | 1992 | Peter Heaton-Jones | Conservative |
| Liberal Democrats | John Hemming | Birmingham Yardley | | 2005 | Jess Phillips | Labour |
| Liberal Democrats | Martin Horwood | Cheltenham | | 2005 | Alex Chalk | Conservative |
| Liberal Democrats | The Right Honourable; Simon Hughes | Bermondsey and Old Southwark | Minister of State for Justice and Civil Liberties | 1983 | Neil Coyle | Labour |
| Liberal Democrats | Mark Hunter | Cheadle | | 2005 | Mary Robinson | Conservative |
| Liberal Democrats | Julian Huppert | Cambridge | | 2010 | Daniel Zeichner | Labour |
| Liberal Democrats | The Right Honourable; Charles Kennedy | Ross, Skye and Lochaber | Leader of the Liberal Democrats (1999–2006) | 1983 | Ian Blackford | SNP |
| Liberal Democrats | The Right Honourable; David Laws | Yeovil | Minister of State for Schools | 2001 | Marcus Fysh | Conservative |
| Liberal Democrats | John Leech | Manchester Withington | | 2005 | Jeff Smith | Labour |
| Liberal Democrats | Stephen Lloyd | Eastbourne | | 2010 | Caroline Ansell | Conservative |
| Liberal Democrats | The Right Honourable; Michael Moore | Berwickshire, Roxburgh and Selkirk | Secretary of State for Scotland (2010–13) | 1997 | Calum Kerr | SNP |
| Liberal Democrats | Tessa Munt | Wells | Parliamentary private secretary to the Secretary of State for Business, Innovation and Skills | 2010 | James Heappey | Conservative |
| Liberal Democrats | Alan Reid | Argyll and Bute | | 2001 | Brendan O'Hara | SNP |
| Liberal Democrats | Dan Rogerson | North Cornwall | Parliament Under-Secretary of State for Water, Forestry, Resource Management and Rural Affairs | 2005 | Scott Mann | Conservative |
| Liberal Democrats | Sir Bob Russell | Colchester | | 1997 | Will Quince | Conservative |
| Liberal Democrats | Adrian Sanders | Torbay | | 1997 | Kevin Foster | Conservative |
| Liberal Democrats | Sir Robert Smith, 3rd Baronet | West Aberdeenshire and Kincardine | | 1997 | Stuart Donaldson | SNP |
| Liberal Democrats | Jo Swinson | East Dunbartonshire | Parliamentary Under-Secretary of State for Employment Relations, Consumer and Postal Affairs | 2005 | John Nicolson | SNP |
| Liberal Democrats | Mike Thornton | Eastleigh | | 2013 | Mims Davies | Conservative |
| Liberal Democrats | The Right Honourable; John Thurso, 3rd Viscount Thurso | Caithness, Sutherland and Easter Ross | Chairman of the Finance and Services Committee | 2001 | Paul Monaghan | SNP |
| Liberal Democrats | David Ward | Bradford East | | 2010 | Imran Hussain | Labour |
| Liberal Democrats | The Right Honourable; Steve Webb | Thornbury and Yate | Minister of State for Pensions | 1997 | Luke Hall | Conservative |
| Liberal Democrats | Roger Williams | Brecon and Radnorshire | | 2001 | Christopher Davies | Conservative |
| Liberal Democrats | Stephen Williams | Bristol West | Parliamentary Under-Secretary of State for Communities and Local Government | 2005 | Thangam Debbonaire | Labour |
| Liberal Democrats | The Right Honourable; Jenny Willott | Cardiff Central | Parliamentary Under-Secretary of State for Employment Relations and Consumer Affairs | 2005 | Jo Stevens | Labour |
| Liberal Democrats | Simon Wright | Norwich South | | 2010 | Clive Lewis | Labour |
| Conservative | Nick de Bois | Enfield North | | 2010 | Joan Ryan | Labour |
| Conservative | Angie Bray | Ealing Central and Acton | | 2010 | Rupa Huq | Labour |
| Conservative | Mary Macleod | Brentford and Isleworth | | 2010 | Ruth Cadbury | Labour |
| Conservative | The Right Honourable; Esther McVey | Wirral West | Minister of State for Employment | 2010 | Margaret Greenwood | Labour |
| Conservative | Stephen Mosley | City of Chester | | 2010 | Chris Matheson | Labour |
| Conservative | Eric Ollerenshaw | Lancaster and Fleetwood | | 2010 | Catherine Smith | Labour |
| Conservative | Simon Reevell | Dewsbury | | 2010 | Paula Sherriff | Labour |
| Conservative | Lee Scott | Ilford North | | 2005 | Wes Streeting | Labour |
| Conservative | Paul Uppal | Wolverhampton South West | | 2010 | Rob Marris | Labour |
| Alliance | Naomi Long | Belfast East | | 2010 | Gavin Robinson | DUP |
| DUP | William McCrea | South Antrim | | 2005 | Danny Kinahan | UUP |
| Respect Party | George Galloway | Bradford West | | 2012 | Naz Shah | Labour |
| Sinn Féin | Michelle Gildernew | Fermanagh and South Tyrone | | 2001 | Tom Elliott | UUP |
| UKIP | Mark Reckless | Rochester and Strood | | 2010 (Note: Reckless was elected as a Conservative in 2010, but defected to UKIP and won re-election as a UKIP candidate in the 2014 Rochester and Strood by-election.) | Kelly Tolhurst | Conservative |
| Independent (elected as Liberal Democrat) | Mike Hancock | Portsmouth South | | 1997 | Flick Drummond | Conservative |

== Open seats changing hands ==
| Party | Candidate | Incumbent | Constituency | Defeated by | Party |
|---|---|---|---|---|---|
| Labour | Richard Baker | Frank Doran | Aberdeen North | Kirsty Blackman | SNP |
| Liberal Democrats | Steve Bradley | Don Foster | Bath | Ben Howlett | Conservative |
| Liberal Democrats | Julie Pörksen | Alan Beith | Berwick-upon-Tweed | Anne-Marie Trevelyan | Conservative |
| Liberal Democrats | Lauren Keith | Sarah Teather | Brent Central | Dawn Butler | Labour |
| Labour | Michael Marra | Jim McGovern | Dundee West | Chris Law | SNP |
| Labour | Ricky Henderson | Alistair Darling | Edinburgh South West | Joanna Cherry | SNP |
| Independent | Karen Whitefield (Lab) | Eric Joyce (elected as Labour) (Note: Joyce was a member of the Labour Party until his resignation from the party in 2012 in the aftermath of an assault.) | Falkirk | John McNally | SNP |
| Labour | Melanie Ward | Lindsay Roy | Glenrothes | Peter Grant | SNP |
| Liberal Democrats | Christine Jardine | Malcolm Bruce | Gordon | Alex Salmond | SNP |
| Labour | Liz Evans | Martin Caton | Gower | Byron Davies | Conservative |
| Liberal Democrats | Lisa Smart | Andrew Stunell | Hazel Grove | William Wragg | Conservative |
| Conservative | Graham Cox | Mike Weatherley | Hove | Peter Kyle | Labour |
| Labour | Kenny Selbie | Gordon Brown | Kirkcaldy and Cowdenbeath | Roger Mullin | SNP |
| Liberal Democrats | Vikki Slade | Annette Brooke | Mid Dorset and North Poole | Michael Tomlinson | Conservative |
| Labour | Kenny Young | David Hamilton | Midlothian | Owen Thompson | SNP |
| Liberal Democrats | Tim Brett | Menzies Campbell | North East Fife | Stephen Gethins | SNP |
| Liberal Democrats | Josh Mason | Ian Swales | Redcar | Anna Turley | Labour Co-operative |
| Liberal Democrats | David Rendel | David Heath | Somerton and Frome | David Warburton | Conservative |
| Labour | Rowenna Davis | John Denham | Southampton Itchen | Royston Smith | Conservative |
| Labour | Johanna Boyd | Anne McGuire | Stirling | Steven Paterson | SNP |
| Liberal Democrats | Rachel Gilmour | Jeremy Browne | Taunton Deane | Rebecca Pow | Conservative |
