= Constituencies in Scotland =

Constituencies in Scotland may refer to:

- Scottish Parliament constituencies and electoral regions, constituencies of the Scottish Parliament
- Scottish Westminster constituencies, constituencies of the United Kingdom Parliament
