= Scottish constituencies =

Scottish constituencies may refer to:

- Scottish Westminster constituencies, constituencies of the House of Commons of the Parliament of Great Britain from 1708 to 1801 and of the Parliament of the United Kingdom from 1801 to present
- Scottish Parliament constituencies, also known as Holyrood constituencies
