= James Craigen =

James Craigen may refer to:

- James Craigen (footballer) (born 1991), English footballer
- James Craigen (politician) (1938–2026), Scottish politician
