= John James Davidson =

John James Davidson (13 December 1898, Inverness – 9 January 1976, Leigh-on-Sea) was a Scottish Labour politician.

Davidson was born in Inverness, the son of a tailor, and moved to Glasgow at a young age. He served in the First World War as an infantryman in the Royal Scots Fusiliers, enlisting underage and reaching the rank of corporal.

Following the war, he worked for a Glasgow newspaper as a stereotyper in the printing industry, and became active in left-wing politics. He joined the committee of the Glasgow Independent Labour Party, and then in 1933 becoming chair of the Glasgow Labour Party. He was then elected as the Member of Parliament (MP) for Glasgow Maryhill at the 1935 UK general election. From 1940 to 1942 he served as the parliamentary private secretary to Joseph Westwood, the under-secretary of state for Scotland. He stood down in 1945, and appears to have left Glasgow.

He died aged 77 in Rochford Hospital, Southend-on-Sea, on 9 January 1976.

Parliament of the United Kingdom
Preceded by Douglas Jamieson	Member of Parliament for Glasgow Maryhill; 1935–1945	Succeeded by William Hannan
