= William Hannan =

Scottish politician

William Hannan (30 August 1906 – 6 March 1987) was a Scottish Labour Party politician.

Educated at North Kelvinside Secondary School, Glasgow, Hannan originally worked as an insurance agent, and from 1941 to 1945 was a member of Glasgow Corporation. He was elected as the Member of Parliament (MP) for Glasgow Maryhill at the 1945 general election, and held the seat until his retirement at the February 1974 general election. He was a Lord of the Treasury from 1946 to 1951, and parliamentary private secretary (PPS) to George Brown at both the Department of Economic Affairs and the Foreign Office from 1964 to 1968.

Hannan, a committed pro-European, was one of 69 Labour MPs to break a three-line whip and vote for Britain's entry into the European Economic Community in October 1971. He was, however, opposed to Scottish devolution, and was involved with the 'Scotland is British' campaign prior to the 1979 referendum on Home Rule. Always on the right wing of the Labour Party, in 1981 he became a founder member of the breakaway Social Democratic Party (SDP), and in February of that year was one of 100 signatories to an advertisement in The Guardian supporting the Limehouse Declaration.

== Footnotes ==
Parliament of the United Kingdom
Preceded by John James Davidson	Member of Parliament for Glasgow Maryhill; 1945–Feb 1974	Succeeded by James Craigen
