= James Couper (politician) =

Scottish shipowner Unionist Party (1870-1946)

Couper (second from right) in 1925

James Brown Couper, DL, JP (1870 – 14 October 1946) was a Scottish shipowner Unionist Party (Scotland) MP for Glasgow Maryhill.

He won the seat in 1924, but lost it in 1929.

Parliament of the United Kingdom
Preceded by John Muir	Member of Parliament for Glasgow Maryhill; 1924–1929	Succeeded by John Clarke
