= John Muir (trade unionist) =

John William Muir (15 December 1879 – 11 January 1931) was the editor of The Worker, a newspaper of the Clyde Workers' Committee, who was prosecuted under the Defence of the Realm Act for an article criticising World War I.

Born in Glasgow, by the early 1910s, Muir was the editor of The Socialist, the newspaper of the Socialist Labour Party. However, he resigned the post in 1914, as he was in favour of the war.

He became involved in the Shop Stewards' Movement and was a member of the Clyde Workers' Committee, an organisation that had been formed to campaign against the Munitions Act, which forbade engineers from leaving the works where they were employed. For publishing an article in The Worker entitled "Should the workers arm?", Muir was jailed for twelve months, alongside Willie Gallacher.

In 1917, Muir joined the Independent Labour Party and became close to John Wheatley. In the 1918 election, he stood for the Labour Party in Glasgow Maryhill but was unsuccessful. He won the seat in the 1922 general election and retained the seat in 1923. He lost his seat in the 1924 election after which he ran the Workers Educational Association until 1930.

Parliament of the United Kingdom
Preceded by William Mitchell-Thomson	Member of Parliament for Glasgow Maryhill; 1922–1924	Succeeded by James Couper
Non-profit organization positions
Preceded by J. M. MacTavish	General Secretary of the Workers' Educational Association; 1928–1930	Succeeded by Alec Firth
