= Ann McKechin =

British politician

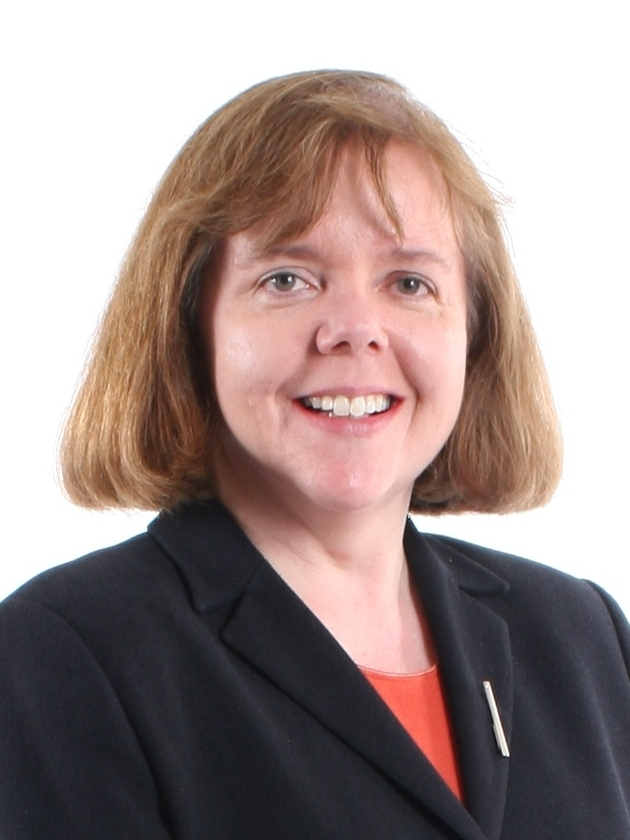
- Official portrait, c. 2008–09

Shadow Secretary of State for Scotland
- In office 8 October 2010 – 7 October 2011
- Leader: Ed Miliband
- Preceded by: Jim Murphy
- Succeeded by: Margaret Curran

Shadow Minister for Scotland
- In office 11 May 2010 – 8 October 2010
- Leader: Harriet Harman (Acting)
- Preceded by: Position established
- Succeeded by: Tom Greatrex

Parliamentary Under-Secretary of State for Scotland
- In office 16 September 2008 – 11 May 2010
- Prime Minister: Gordon Brown
- Preceded by: David Cairns
- Succeeded by: David Mundell

Member of Parliament for Glasgow North Glasgow Maryhill (2001–2005)
- In office 7 June 2001 – 30 March 2015
- Preceded by: Maria Fyfe
- Succeeded by: Patrick Grady

Personal details
- Born: 22 April 1961 (age 65) Paisley, Scotland
- Party: Labour
- Education: University of Strathclyde
- Website: annmckechinmp.net

Ann McKechin (born 22 April 1961) is a former British Labour Party politician and was Member of Parliament (MP) for Glasgow Maryhill from 2001 until 2005 and Glasgow North from 2005 to 2015. She was a junior minister under Gordon Brown before becoming a member of the Miliband shadow cabinet. She lost her seat to the Scottish National Party in the landslide at the 2015 general election.

== Early life ==
Born in Paisley to Anne (née Coyle) and William Joseph McKechin, she was educated at Paisley Grammar School and Sacred Heart High School, before studying Scots law at the University of Strathclyde. She joined the Glasgow-based Pacitti Jones solicitors in 1983 as a solicitor, becoming a partner in 1990, she left the practice in 2000.

McKechin held several posts within the Glasgow Kelvin Labour Party from 1995, then the constituency of George Galloway, then a Labour MP. She was selected as a candidate for the 1999 European election, but failed to be elected.

== Political career ==
She was elected to the House of Commons at the 2001 general election for the Glasgow Maryhill constituency, following the retirement of the previous Labour MP, Maria Fyfe. She retained the Maryhill seat with a majority of nearly 10,000 votes. In the boundary changes which came into force for the 2005 election, the Maryhill constituency was abolished, and McKechin was elected for the newly drawn Glasgow North constituency, but with a much-reduced majority of 3,338 over the Scottish Liberal Democrats.

In the House of Commons, McKechin served briefly as the Parliamentary private secretary to Jacqui Smith in 2005 in her capacity as Minister of State at both the Department of Trade and Industry and at the Department for Education and Skills. She also served on a number of select committees including; Scottish Affairs (2001–05) and International Development (since 2005). She replaced David Cairns as Parliamentary Under-Secretary of State at the Scotland Office on 16 September 2008.

In October 2010, McKechin was elected to the Shadow Cabinet and appointed as Shadow Secretary of State for Scotland, but was replaced by Margaret Curran in shadow cabinet reshuffle on 7 October 2011.

She lost her seat to Patrick Grady of the Scottish National Party at the 2015 general election.

Parliament of the United Kingdom
Preceded by Maria Fyfe	Member of Parliament for Glasgow Maryhill; 2001–2005	Constituency abolished
New constituency	Member of Parliament for Glasgow North; 2005–2015	Succeeded by Patrick Grady
Political offices
Preceded by David Cairns	Parliamentary Under-Secretary of State for Scotland; 2008–2010	Succeeded by David Mundell
Preceded by Jim Murphy	Shadow Secretary of State for Scotland; 2010–2011	Succeeded by Margaret Curran
