= John S. Clarke =

British art expert, lion tamer and politician (1885–1959)

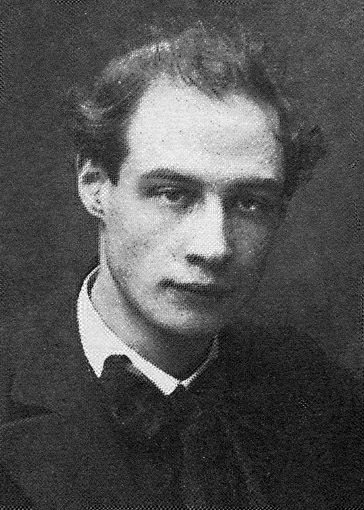
- John S. Clarke, c. 1918

Member of Parliament for Glasgow Maryhill
- In office 30 May 1929 – 7 October 1931
- Preceded by: James Brown Couper
- Succeeded by: Douglas Jamieson

Personal details
- Born: 4 February 1885 Jarrow, England
- Died: 30 January 1959 (aged 73) Glasgow, Scotland
- Party: Independent Labour
- Spouse: Sarah Millicent Balkind
- Occupation: Art expert; lion tamer; politician; writer

John Smith Clarke (4 February 1885 – 30 January 1959) was a British author, newspaper editor, poet, socialist politician, and lion tamer.

Born in Jarrow, Tyne and Wear, Clarke began performing in a circus at age of 17 as a lion tamer. In his early life, he was also a sailor and gun runner for Russian revolutionaries. During the First World War, he wrote for publications that expressed an anti-war sentiment, which forced him to go into hiding. He was part of a group of Socialist Labour Party conscientious objectors called the 'flying corps' who evaded authorities and avoided prosecution. In 1920, he visited Russia as a delegate to the Second Congress of the Communist International.

Clarke joined the Independent Labour Party in the late 1920s and served on the Glasgow Corporation. In 1929 he was elected Labour MP for Maryhill in Glasgow. He lost the seat in 1931 and subsequently left the Independent Labour Party. Over his lifetime, he identified as a Bolshevik, anti-capitalist, and neither right nor left-wing.

Clarke was interested in the arts and held governance positions for the Society of Antiquaries of Scotland, the Royal Fine Art Commission for Scotland, the Scottish National Portrait Gallery and the Glasgow School of Art. He was a collector of antiquities and amassed a wealth of knowledge about military weapons, armour and Scottish history. He also continued to tame wild animals throughout his life; he demonstrated humane training methods in a lion and tiger cage whilst an MP, and brought a box of snakes to Parliament.

== Early life ==
John Smith Clarke was born in Jarrow on 4 February 1885. His father—also named John Smith Clarke (1844-1906), a cloth salesman from Bath, Somerset—and mother, Sarah Ann Chiswell (1844-1918) of Bishop Sutton, Somerset. He was the thirteenth of fourteen children, seven of whom survived into adulthood. At the age of ten he was able to ride a horse bareback and without a bridle. In 1897, at the age of twelve, he went to sea for the first time, working on a merchant ship.

At age 17, he was performing as a lion tamer and was attacked multiple times by animals. Clarke claimed he was the youngest lion tamer in the country at the time. During this time, Clarke was working as a messenger for North Eastern Railway. For a while, he ran a travelling menagerie.

Whilst in Newcastle upon Tyne, he took part in a local socialist society and he became the editor of its newspaper, The Keel, in 1906. Clarke returned to the sea and was involved in gun running for Russian revolutionaries. He recounted his experiences — including witnessing a murder and suffering a knife attack in Antwerp — in a series of articles for the Sunday Sun entitled Roughing it Round the World. Clarke's experience in writing opened up opportunities in the publishing industry, and he began writing for newspapers and journals in Edinburgh. He was secretary to the feminist Jane Clapperton, who had an impact on Clarke's politics and whom he described as "one of the most wonderful women I ever met". By 1911 he had married Sarah Millicent Balkind, who was originally from Russia and worked as an assistant to a jeweller. Her father was a Rabbi and a Hebrew teacher. Clarke and Balkind had one son together, John Hume Chiswell Clarke, born in Edinburgh.

== Political career ==
=== First World War ===
Around the early 1910s, Clarke became a socialist and joined the Socialist Labour Party (SLP). He edited the party newspaper, The Socialist, from 1913 to 1914 and again for a period during the First World War with Arthur MacManus, Tom Bell and William Paul. He also contributed to journals, including the Reform Journal, Forward and Plebs. Clarke was opposed to the war and, although he expressed anti-war attitudes in his publications, managed to avoid being imprisoned for them. The Socialist, in particular, was an anti-war newspaper that aimed to move the working class away from their patriotic support of the war by emphasising that it was a result of capitalism. At the war's outbreak, Clarke wrote in The Socialist: "Our attitude is neither pro-German nor pro-British, but anti-capitalist and all that it stands for in every country of the world". Authorities initially dismissed The Socialist but came to see it as a threat as more workers—including a shop stewards' union—began to align with its sentiment.

During the war, he was part of the 'flying corps', a group of conscientious objectors named as such because they would "fly" away from the authorities in order to escape being detained. A network of these contentious objectors arose in locations including Hill Top Farm near Windermere, near the Clock Tower in Leicester and in Arleston near Derby—which, by 1916, had gained a reputation for being a centre for those opposed to the war, particularly SLP members. Members of the 'flying corps' would arrive at one of these locations, disseminate socialist information via public speaking or literature, and then leave to avoid detection from the authorities. After being tipped off by a sympathetic policeman that he was going to be arrested, Clarke fled Scotland and spent much of his time during the war hiding in a farm in Arleston. He worked as a labourer while continuing to write, including articles and poetry for The Socialist. Despite being published in precarious circumstances, the newspaper gained a readership throughout Scotland and northern England and went from 3,000 readers in 1914 to 20,000 in 1918.

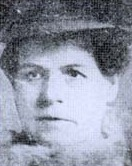
Clarke made an impromptu speech at the funeral of Alice Wheeldon, despite being on the run from the authorities at the time.

The accommodation in Derby for members of the 'flying corps' was partly provided by the suffragette and anti-war campaigner Alice Wheeldon. Wheeldon was a victim of the police's intervention into militant groups opposed to the war. She was accused of planning to assassinate David Lloyd George by a spy and was imprisoned. She died shortly after her release. Despite being on the run at the time, Clarke attended her funeral and gave an impromptu speech.

=== Russia ===
In 1920, shop stewards in Scotland chose Clarke as one of their delegates to the Second Congress of the Communist International. He attended the Congress along with Sylvia Pankhurst, Marjory Newbold and Willie Gallacher but was not made a voting delegate. Whilst in Russia, Clarke cured Lenin's dog of an unspecified illness and received a photograph of Lenin signed "To Comrade Clarke, Vladimir Oulianoff 6.8.1920". Clarke recounted his experiences in Pen Pictures of Russia under the 'Red Terror'. Upon his return from Russia, he escaped arrest by sailing across the North Sea alone.

=== Independent Labour Party ===
Clarke was able to emerge from hiding in the 1920s as the government's focus on anti-war groups waned. In the late 1920s, Clarke joined the Independent Labour Party (ILP) and was elected to the Glasgow Corporation. He was elected as the Labour Party MP for Glasgow Maryhill at the 1929 general election. He spent much of his time in Parliament playing pranks and writing humorous epitaphs for political opponents who were not yet dead, including Ramsay MacDonald. In 1931 he wrote about the lack of humour in Parliament: "there are so few healthy, ribald laughs at Westminster that the building sometimes presents itself to the sensitive soul as one vast mausoleum". He lost his seat at the 1931 general election and left the ILP in 1932 when it split from the Labour Party. At that time, Clarke had been in disagreements with the Maryhill and Queen's Cross branches of the ILP for voting against the Parliamentary line of the ILP and with the official Labour Party. In the same year, he was in the news for missing jury service after being stranded on Ailsa Craig. From 1941 to 1951, Clarke returned to serving on the Glasgow Corporation.

== Art and animal expert ==
Clarke was interested in the arts and became more involved over his lifetime. In 1925 he became a fellow of the Society of Antiquaries of Scotland, then was appointed in 1930 as a member of the Royal Fine Art Commission for Scotland by the King following a recommendation from the Secretary of State for Scotland. From 1930 to 1933, he was a trustee of the Scottish National Portrait Gallery. He was appointed to this position by the Lords Commissioners of the Treasury after Sir Herbert Cook stepped down from the role and was succeeded by Lord Duveen when he resigned from the position. Clarke was a board member of the Glasgow School of Art. He was an admirer of Robert Burns and was one of the most well-known Burns orators in the country. In 1943 he was elected president of the Burns Federation, succeeding M. H. M'Kerrow. In his personal life, Clarke was a collector of historical items, including Marie Antoinette's snuff box and multiple torture instruments. He was considered to be an authority on military weaponry and armour, and compiled a Scottish Encyclopaedia.

Clarke's interest in animals, which began when he was a child in the circus, lasted throughout his life. He continued practising lion taming, including during his time as an MP. In 1930, Clarke was invited to visit Bertram Mills's menagerie in Hastings and entered the lion's cage. He opposed the Performing Animals Bill, which would have required stricter regulations on circuses, believing that humane training methods were possible. To collect evidence in support of his case, he demonstrated these humane methods himself at a menagerie in Glasgow. The trainer was impressed by Clarke, describing him as "the bravest man I have met". Clarke wrote about his thoughts on "gentling" dangerous animals in his book Circus Parade (1936), which also recounts the history of the circus. It was not just lions and tigers which interested Clarke; when an MP, he took a box of snakes into the House of Commons, much to the surprise of the other MPs, and demonstrated his skill at snake charming. In 1932, Clarke expressed support for a civic zoo in Glasgow, pointing to the success of the London civic zoo. During the Second World War, Clarke returned to circus lion taming, claiming to be the oldest lion tamer in the country.

== Political views ==
Clarke was a socialist and Marxist, although his views changed over his lifetime. Historian Raymond Challinor wrote that during the First World War, Clarke was a socialist "in a time when to be a socialist meant being continually in danger of losing one's job". He was a target for magistrates who sought to shut down talks from anti-war and critical speakers; one example was in November 1915 when police targeted one of his lectures at Glasgow Lyric Theatre titled 'Glorious Episodes in British History', whereby he managed to avoid arrest by sneaking out of the theatre.

After returning from Moscow in the early 1920s, Clarke concluded that, even though he supported the Soviet Union, he could not envisage a similar setup in Britain and never joined the Communist Party of Great Britain. He admired Lenin as a person but not as an idealised figure. When he was editor of The Worker, he identified as a Bolshevik but reported to readers what he perceived to be the shortcomings of the leaders of the Comintern. From this point onwards, his views became more moderate.

In 1929, he published a newspaper article titled "Why I am not left-wing", explaining that he identified as neither right nor left-wing.

Socialist and feminist historian Sheila Rowbotham wrote that Clarke's interpretation of Marxism focussed on the spiritual and material gains that revolution would manifest. She also wrote that he was against 'sexual puritanism' and religion. Clarke's interest in Robert Burns extended to the poet's politics: Clarke wrote a pamphlet in 1917 that rejected imperialist interpretations of Burns and instead offered a more revolutionary take; he published another pamphlet in 1925 which depicted Burns as a social reformer.

== Death and legacy ==
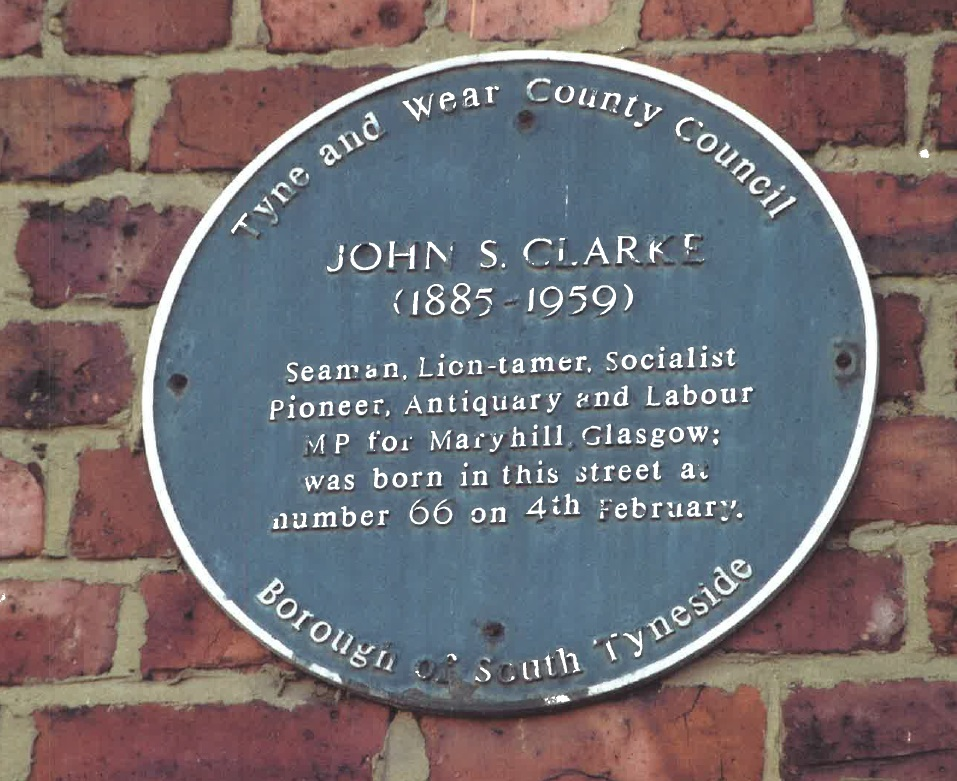
A blue plaque commemorating John S. Clarke is located on Albert Street, Jarrow.

Clarke died on 30 January 1959 at Southern General Hospital in Glasgow, aged 73. His obituary in The Daily Telegraph, titled "Life in the Jungle", described him as "a refreshing character, and on the whole more rewarding than those whose experience of Socialism is confined to Winchester and the London School of Economics".

In 1985, Tyne and Wear Council honoured Clarke with a blue plaque near his birthplace of Albert Street in Jarrow. The unveiling ceremony was conducted by Clarke's grandson, Major Ian C. Clarke. John S. Clarke is a character in Sheila Rowbotham's play Friends of Alice Wheeldon, based on the events which led to Wheeldon's death. He is described as "an ex-lion tamer and zoo owner". Clarke is mentioned in a poem by the Scottish poet Edwin Morgan which references his love of wild animals, specifically snakes:

...
John S. Clarke, festooned with snakes, said, 'Touch one,
look closely, they're quite beautiful; not slimy;
come on, come down to the front now, that's better.
Don't be afraid, girls, aren't these eyes pure jewels?
Come on lads, stretch your hands out, try this johnny,
I bet it's like no creature you ever handled.'
...

— extract from Hands On, 1937, by Edwin Morgan

== Electoral history ==
Cover of Clarke's 1927 book published by the press of the National Council of Labour Colleges.

Electoral history of John S. Clarke
Year	Office	Party	Votes			Result	Ref.
Year	Office	Party	Total	%	P.	Result	Ref.
1929	MP	Independent Labour	18,311	50.60%	1st	Won	
1931	MP	Independent Labour	16,613	44.51%	2nd	Lost	
Source: Craig, F. W. S., ed. (1977). British Parliamentary Election Results: 1918–1949.

== Publications ==
- Satires, Lyrics and Poems (Chiefly Humorous). Glasgow: Socialist Labour Press, 1919.
- Pen Pictures of Russia under the "Red Terror": Reminiscences of a Surreptitious Journey to Russia to Attend the Second Congress of the Third International. Glasgow: National Workers' Committees, 1921.
- Marxism and History. London: N.C.L.C. Publishing Society, n.d. [1927].
- Circus Parade. London: B. T. Batsford, 1936.

Parliament of the United Kingdom
Preceded by James Brown Couper	Member of Parliament for Glasgow Maryhill; 1929–1931	Succeeded by Douglas Jamieson
