= Elspeth Attwooll =

British politician (born 1943)

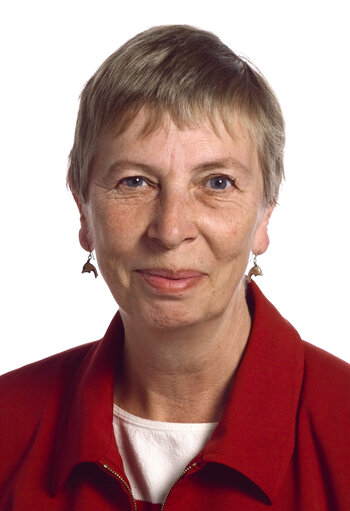

Member of the European Parliament for Scotland
- In office 10 June 1999 – 4 June 2009
- Preceded by: Position established
- Succeeded by: George Lyon

Personal details
- Born: 1 February 1943 (age 83) Chislehurst, England
- Party: Liberal Democrat

Elspeth Attwooll (born 1 February 1943) is a Scottish retired Liberal Democrat politician. She is a former Member of the European Parliament (MEP) for Scotland.

She stood for parliament in Glasgow Maryhill in every general election from October 1974 to 1997 as a Liberal before 1988 and a Liberal Democrat after 1988. She was part of the Liberal Democrat delegation to the Scottish Constitutional Convention.

She was first elected to the European Parliament in 1999, the first Liberal Democrat ever to be elected to the European Parliament from Scotland, and retained her seat in 2004. While an MEP, she served on the Fisheries and Regional Development Committees, being elected a vice-chair of the former. She stood down as MEP at the 2009 European Parliamentary elections, and was succeeded by fellow Liberal Democrat George Lyon, a farmer and former MSP for Argyll and Bute.

Her work in the European Parliament included drafting many reports, including one on Community action in relation to whaling which stressed the need for the European Union to use its influence to secure the International Whaling Commission and agreement between the pro- and anti- whaling lobbies within it. She was and is an advocate of radical decentralisation of the Common Fisheries Policy.

Previously, Attwooll taught jurisprudence and legal theory at the School of Law of the University of Glasgow, where she was a senior lecturer.
