= Douglas Jamieson, Lord Jamieson =

Scottish Unionist politician and judge

Douglas Jamieson, Lord Jamieson, PC (14 April 1880 – 31 May 1952) was a Scottish Unionist politician and judge.

== Biography ==
Jamieson was born on 14 April 1880 to Violet and William Jamieson, a merchant. Educated at Cargilfield School, Fettes College, the University of Glasgow and the University of Edinburgh, He was admitted as an advocate in 1911 and became a King's Counsel in 1926.

Jamieson was an unsuccessful candidate for Stirling and Falkirk in 1929 and was elected for Glasgow Maryhill in October 1931, holding the seat until his retirement in 1935. He was Solicitor General for Scotland from October 1933 until March 1935, and Lord Advocate from March to October 1935. He was appointed a Privy Counsellor in May 1935.

On his resignation, he was appointed in November 1935 to the bench of the Court of Session, with the judicial title Lord Jamieson, replacing Lord Blackburn. He held this post until his death in 1952 aged 72.

Legal offices
Preceded by Wilfrid Normand	Solicitor General for Scotland; 1933–1935	Succeeded by Thomas Cooper
Preceded by Wilfrid Normand	Lord Advocate; 1935	Succeeded by Thomas Cooper
Parliament of the United Kingdom
Preceded by John Smith Clarke	Member of Parliament for Glasgow Maryhill; 1931–1935	Succeeded by John James Davidson
