= Alistair Darling =

British politician (1953–2023)

The Right Honourable The Lord Darling of Roulanish PC
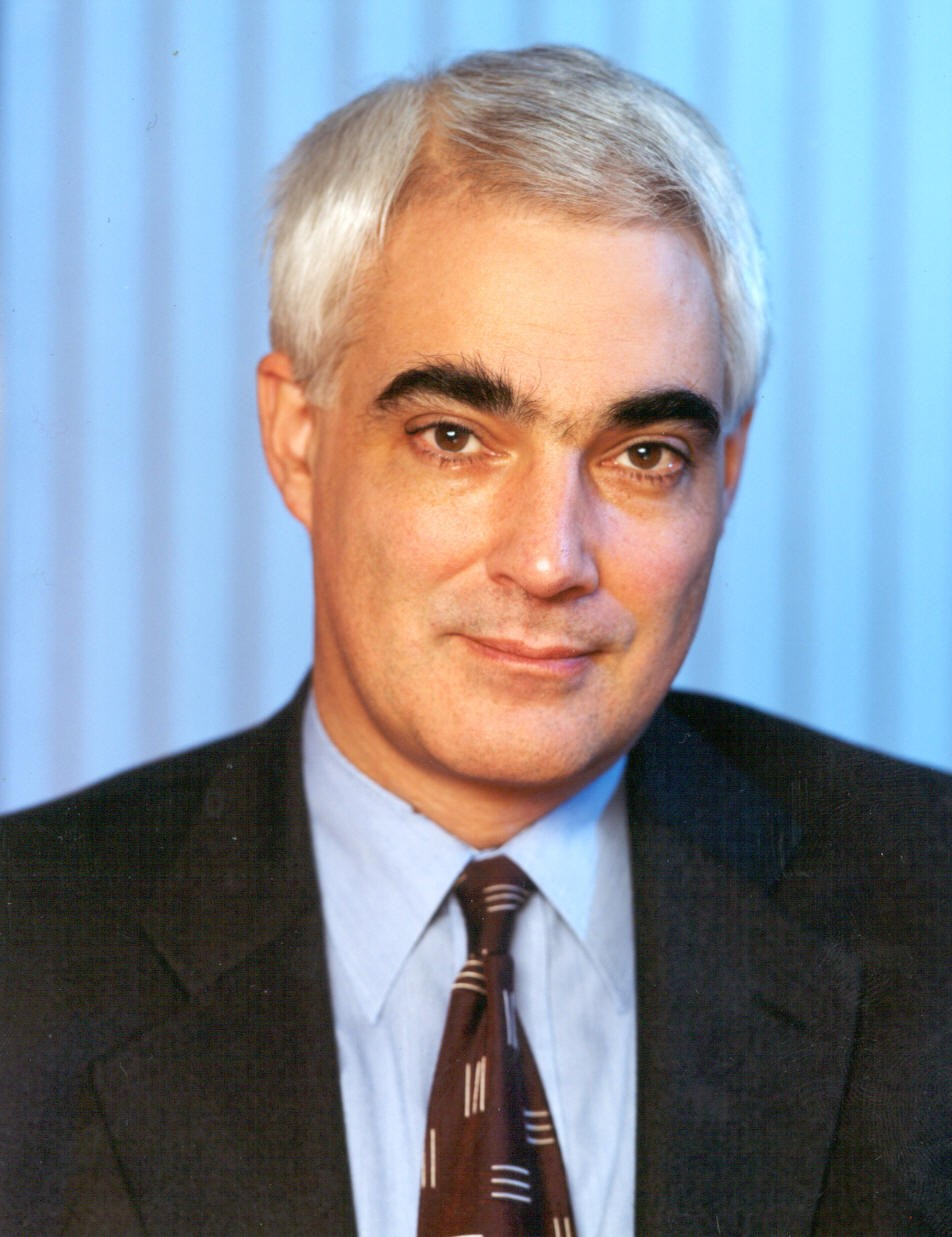
- Official portrait, 2007

Chancellor of the Exchequer
- In office 28 June 2007 – 11 May 2010
- Prime Minister: Gordon Brown
- Preceded by: Gordon Brown
- Succeeded by: George Osborne

Secretary of State for Trade and Industry; President of the Board of Trade
- In office 5 May 2006 – 28 June 2007
- Prime Minister: Tony Blair
- Preceded by: Alan Johnson
- Succeeded by: John Hutton (Note: Business, Enterprise and Regulatory Reform)

Secretary of State for Scotland
- In office 13 June 2003 – 5 May 2006
- Prime Minister: Tony Blair
- Preceded by: Helen Liddell
- Succeeded by: Douglas Alexander

Secretary of State for Transport
- In office 29 May 2002 – 5 May 2006
- Prime Minister: Tony Blair
- Preceded by: Stephen Byers (Note: Transport, Local Government and the Regions)
- Succeeded by: Douglas Alexander

Secretary of State for Work and Pensions (Note: Social Security (1998–2001))
- In office 27 July 1998 – 29 May 2002
- Prime Minister: Tony Blair
- Preceded by: Harriet Harman
- Succeeded by: Andrew Smith

Chief Secretary to the Treasury
- In office 3 May 1997 – 27 July 1998
- Prime Minister: Tony Blair
- Chancellor: Gordon Brown
- Preceded by: William Waldegrave
- Succeeded by: Stephen Byers
Shadow cabinet posts
Shadow Chancellor of the Exchequer
In office 11 May 2010 – 8 October 2010
Leader	Harriet Harman (acting); Ed Miliband
Preceded by	George Osborne
Succeeded by	Alan Johnson
Shadow Chief Secretary to the Treasury
In office 25 July 1996 – 2 May 1997
Leader	Tony Blair
Preceded by	Harriet Harman
Succeeded by	David Heathcoat-Amory
Parliamentary offices
Member of the House of Lords
Lord Temporal
Life peerage 1 December 2015 – 28 July 2020
Member of Parliament for Edinburgh South West Edinburgh Central (1987–2005)
In office 11 June 1987 – 30 March 2015
Preceded by	Alex Fletcher
Succeeded by	Joanna Cherry

Personal details
- Born: Alistair Maclean Darling; 28 November 1953 Hendon, Middlesex, England
- Died: 30 November 2023 (aged 70) Edinburgh, Scotland
- Party: Labour
- Other political affiliations: International Marxist Group
- Spouse: Margaret Vaughan (m. 1986)
- Children: 2
- Education: University of Aberdeen (LLB)

Alistair Maclean Darling, Baron Darling of Roulanish, PC (28 November 1953 – 30 November 2023) was a British politician who served as Chancellor of the Exchequer under Prime Minister Gordon Brown from 2007 to 2010. A member of the Labour Party, he was a member of Parliament (MP) from 1987 to 2015, representing Edinburgh Central and Edinburgh South West.

Darling was first appointed chief secretary to the Treasury by Prime Minister Tony Blair in 1997, and was promoted to Secretary of State for Work and Pensions in 1998. After spending four years at that department, he spent a further four years as Secretary of State for Transport, while also becoming Secretary of State for Scotland in 2003. Blair moved Darling for a final time in 2006, making him President of the Board of Trade and Secretary of State for Trade and Industry. After Brown succeeded Blair as prime minister, he promoted Darling to replace himself as Chancellor of the Exchequer in 2007, a position he remained in until 2010. He served as chancellor during the 2008 financial crisis and the Great Recession.

From 2012 to 2014, Darling was the chairman of the Better Together Campaign, a cross-party group that successfully campaigned for Scotland to remain part of the United Kingdom in the 2014 independence referendum. He was a vocal advocate for the Remain campaign for the 2016 European Union membership referendum. In November 2014, Darling announced that he was standing down at the 2015 general election. He was nominated for a life peerage in the 2015 Dissolution Honours and sat in the House of Lords until his retirement in 2020.

According to the Financial Times, Darling was "one of the most consequential post-war chancellors in modern British history".

== Early life ==
Alistair Darling was born on 28 November 1953 in Hendon, then part of Middlesex (now London), the son of a civil engineer, Thomas, and his wife, Anna MacLean. He was the great-nephew of Sir William Darling, a Conservative/Unionist Member of Parliament for Edinburgh South (1945–1957) who had served as Lord Provost of Edinburgh during the Second World War. He was educated at Chinthurst School, in Tadworth, Surrey, then in Kirkcaldy, and at the private Loretto School, in Musselburgh. He attended the University of Aberdeen, from where he graduated as a Bachelor of Laws (LLB). He became the president of Aberdeen University Students' Representative Council.

Darling joined the Labour Party aged 23, in 1977. He became a solicitor in 1978, then changed course for the Scots bar and was admitted as an advocate in 1984. In 1982 he was elected to the Lothian Regional Council, where he supported large rates rises in defiance of Margaret Thatcher's rate-capping laws, and even threatened not to set a rate at all. He served on the council until he was elected to the House of Commons.

== Member of Parliament ==
Darling first entered Parliament at the 1987 general election in Edinburgh Central, defeating the incumbent Conservative MP, Sir Alexander Fletcher, by 2,262 votes; and remained an Edinburgh MP for 28 years until he stood down in 2015.

Following the creation of the devolved Scottish Parliament, the number of Scottish seats at Westminster was reduced, and the Edinburgh Central constituency he represented was abolished, to be split between constituencies centred on peripheral areas of the city. The Labour government offered a peerage to Lynda Clark, the Advocate General for Scotland, so that Darling could contest the new Edinburgh South West constituency, the main successor to Clark's Edinburgh Pentlands constituency. At the 2005 general election, he won the seat. The Labour Party was so concerned that Darling might be defeated that several senior party figures, including deputy prime minister John Prescott and chancellor Gordon Brown, made encouragement trips to the constituency during the campaign. Despite being a senior Cabinet minister, Darling was hardly seen outside the area, as he was making the maximum effort to win his seat. In the event he won it with a majority of 7,242 over the second-placed Conservative candidate, the latter having been held back by the Liberal Democrats coming in a close third. Darling won by a comfortable 16.5% margin on a 65.4% turnout. In 2010, despite Labour's defeat nationally, he received an increased majority of 8,447.

=== Shadow Cabinet ===
As a backbencher he sponsored the Solicitors (Scotland) Act 1988. He soon became an opposition home affairs spokesman in 1988 on the front bench of Neil Kinnock.

Following the 1992 general election, he became a spokesman on Treasury affairs, but was promoted to Tony Blair's Shadow Cabinet as the shadow chief secretary to the Treasury in 1996.

== In government ==
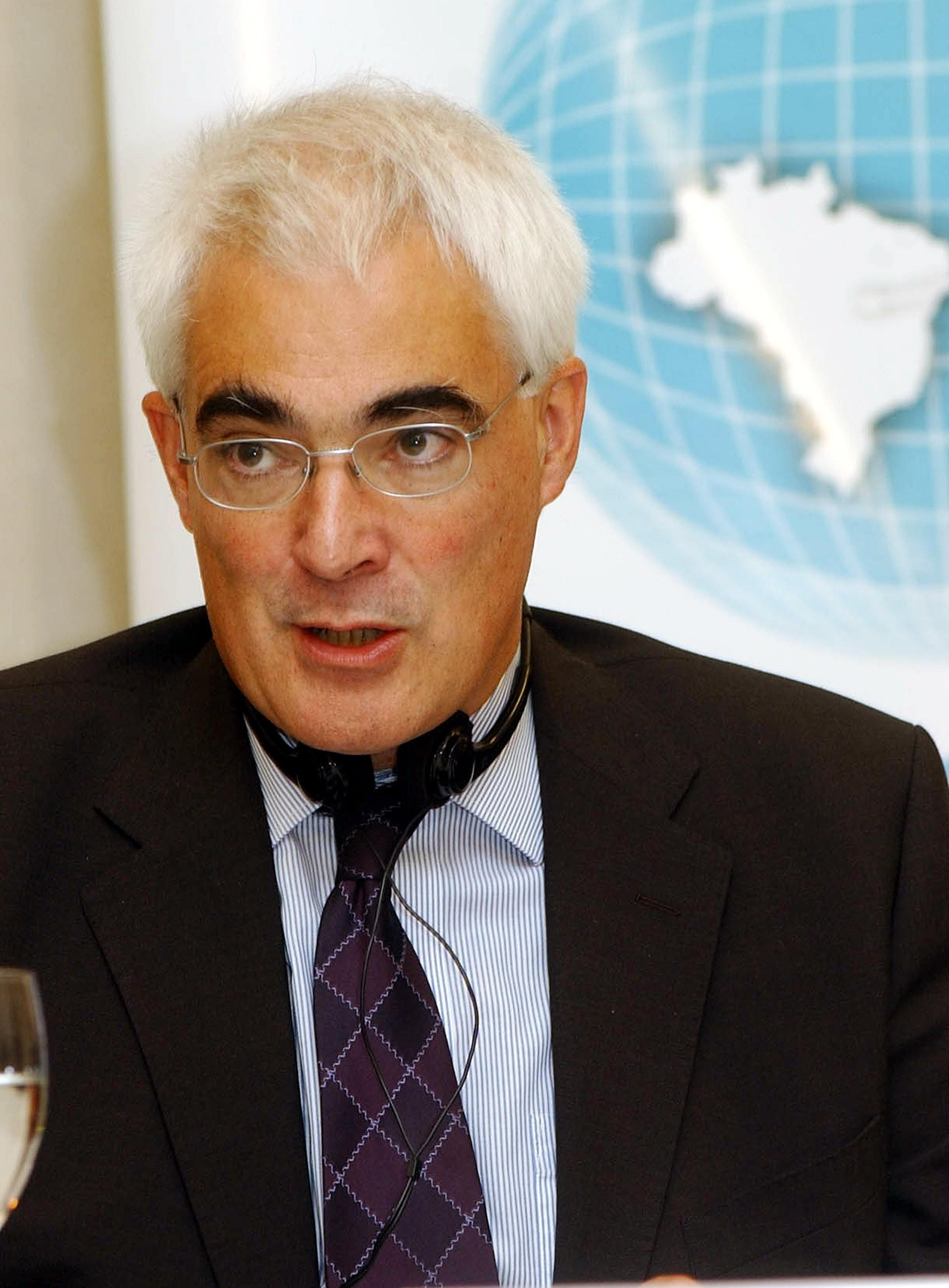
Darling in 2006

Following the 1997 general election, he entered Cabinet as the chief secretary to the Treasury. In 1998, he was appointed Secretary of State for Social Security, replacing Harriet Harman who had been dismissed. Following the 2001 general election, the Department of Social Security was abolished and replaced by the new Department for Work and Pensions, which also took employment away from the education portfolio. Darling fronted the new department until 2002 when he was moved to the Department for Transport, after his predecessor Stephen Byers resigned.

=== Secretary of State for Transport ===
Darling was given a brief to "take the department out of the headlines". He oversaw the creation of Network Rail, the successor to Railtrack, which had collapsed in controversial circumstances for which his predecessor was largely blamed. He also procured the passage of the legislation – the Railways and Transport Safety Act 2003 – which abolished the Rail Regulator and replaced the post with the Office of Rail Regulation. He was responsible for the Railways Act 2005 which abolished the Strategic Rail Authority, a creation of the Labour government under the Transport Act 2000. Darling was also responsible for the cancellation of several major light rail schemes, including a major extension to Manchester Metrolink (later reversed) and the proposed Leeds Supertram, citing rising costs of £620 million and £486 million respectively.

Darling gave the government's support to the Crossrail scheme for an east–west rail line under London, whose £10 billion projected cost later rose to £15 billion.

Although he was not at the Department for Transport at the time of the collapse of Railtrack, Darling vigorously defended what had been done in a speech to the House of Commons on 24 October 2005. This included threats that had been made to the independent Rail Regulator that if he intervened to defend the company against the government's attempts to force it into railway administration – a special status for insolvent railway companies – the government would introduce emergency legislation to take the regulator under direct political control.

=== Secretary of State for Scotland ===
In 2003, when the Scotland Office was folded into the Department for Constitutional Affairs, he was appointed Secretary of State for Scotland in combination with his Transport portfolio.

=== Secretary of State for Trade and Industry ===
In the Cabinet reshuffle of May 2006, he was moved to be Secretary of State for Trade and Industry; Douglas Alexander replaced him as both Secretary of State for Transport and Secretary of State for Scotland. On 10 November 2006 in a mini-reshuffle, Malcolm Wicks, the Minister for Energy at the Department of Trade and Industry, and thus one of Darling's junior ministers, was appointed Minister for Science while Darling took over day-to-day control of the Energy portfolio.

=== Chancellor of the Exchequer ===
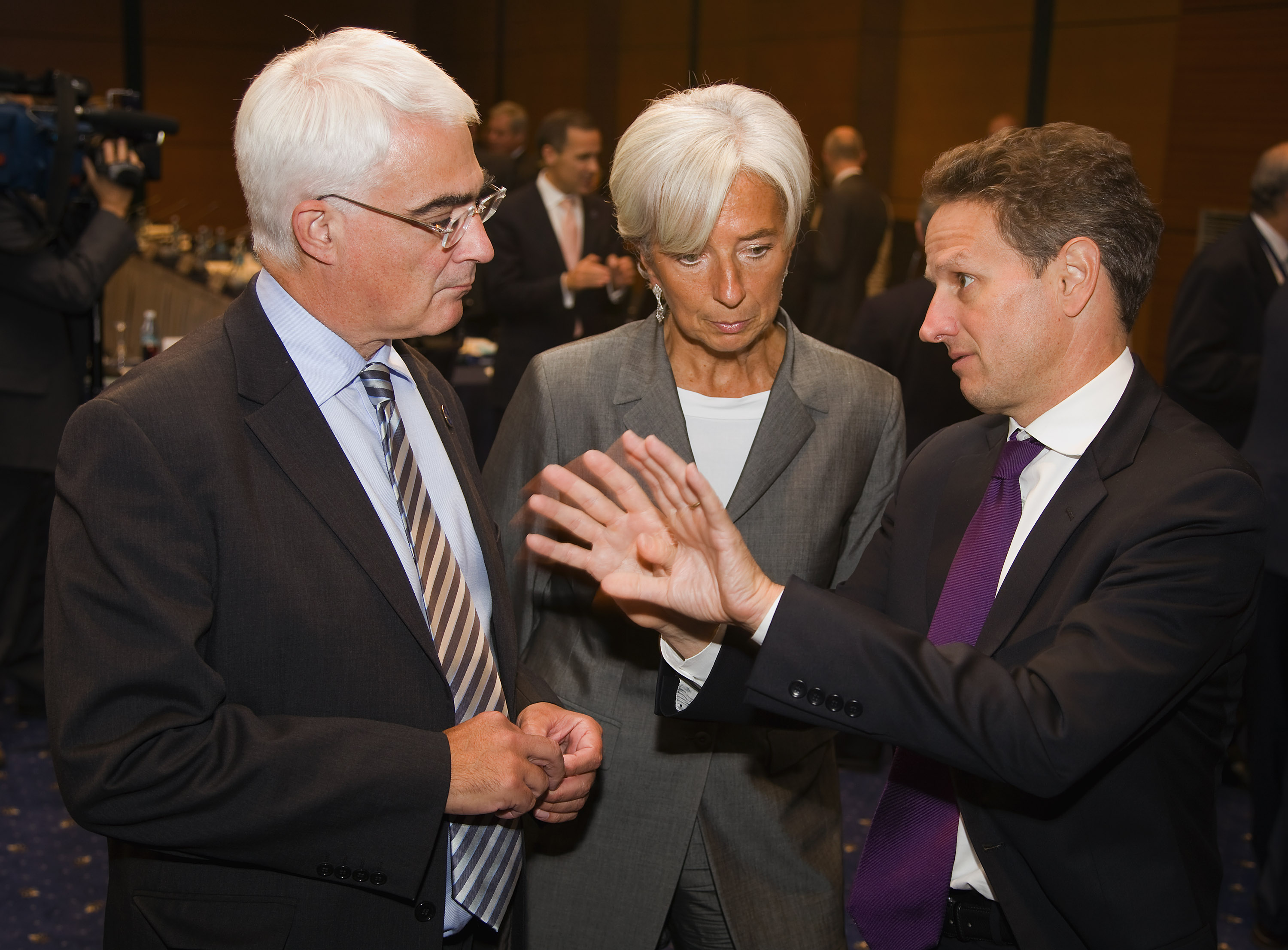
Darling with French finance minister Christine Lagarde and US secretary of the Treasury Timothy Geithner in Istanbul, 2009

On 28 June 2007, the new prime minister and former chancellor of the Exchequer Gordon Brown promoted Darling to replace himself as chancellor, a promotion widely anticipated in the media. Journalists observed that three of Darling's four junior ministers at the Treasury (Angela Eagle, Jane Kennedy and Kitty Ussher) were female, and dubbed his team "Darling's Darlings".

In September 2007, for the first time since 1860, there was a run on a British bank, Northern Rock. Although the Bank of England and the Financial Services Authority have jurisdiction in such cases, ultimate authority for deciding on financial support for a bank in exceptional circumstances rests with the chancellor. The 2007 subprime mortgage crisis had caused a liquidity crisis in the UK banking industry, and Northern Rock was unable to borrow as required by its business model. Darling authorised the Bank of England to lend Northern Rock funds to cover its liabilities and provided an unqualified taxpayers' guarantee of the deposits of savers in Northern Rock to try to stop the run. Northern Rock borrowed up to £20 billion from the Bank of England, and Darling was criticised for becoming sucked into a position where so much public money was tied up in a private company.

In March 2008, Darling's budget was criticised in a media campaign spread by a social networking site. Amid anger at the rise in alcohol duties, James Hughes, a landlord in Edinburgh (where Darling's constituency was based) symbolically barred Darling from his pub, and a passing reporter from the Edinburgh Evening News ran the story. A Facebook group was created, leading dozens of pubs across Britain to follow Hughes, barring Darling from their pubs. The story was eventually picked up by most national press and broadcast media in Britain, and David Cameron, Leader of the Opposition at the time, cited the movement at Prime Minister's Questions on 26 March.

==== Budgets ====
On 12 March 2008, Darling gave his first budget in the House of Commons.

On 22 April 2009, Darling delivered his second budget speech in the House of Commons. To stimulate the motor industry, a £2,000 allowance was announced for a car more than 10 years old, if it was traded in for a new car. A 50% tax band was announced for earners of over £150,000 to start the following tax year.

Darling also announced that personal allowance would be tapered down by £1 for every £2 earned above £100,000 until it reached zero which resulted in an anomalous effective marginal tax rate of 60% above £100,000, with the marginal tax rate returning to 40% for incomes above £112,950.

Gordon Brown confirmed on 10 March 2010 that Darling would deliver his final third budget before the general election, which was delivered on 24 March 2010.

==== Child benefit data scandal ====
Darling was Chancellor of the Exchequer when the confidential personal details of over 25 million British citizens went missing while being sent from his department to the National Audit Office. A former Scotland Yard detective stated that with the current rate of £2.50 per person's details this data could have been sold for £60,000,000. The acting leader of the Liberal Democrats, Vince Cable, put the value at £1.5 billion, or £60 per identity.

==== Storm warning ====
In an interview in The Guardian published 30 August 2008, Darling warned, "The economic times we are facing ... are arguably the worst they've been in 60 years. And I think it's going to be more profound and long-lasting than people thought." His blunt warning led to confusion within the Labour Party. However, Darling insisted that it was his duty to be "straight" with people.

In October 2008 the government bailed out the Royal Bank of Scotland as part of the 2008 bank rescue package; Darling said in 2018 that the country was hours away from a breakdown of law and order if the bank had not been bailed out.

==== 10% income tax band ====
Darling's predecessor, Gordon Brown, just before he became prime minister, had abolished the 10% starting rate on income tax and reduced the basic rate of income tax from 22% to 20% in his final budget on 21 March 2007; this was to come into effect in the tax year starting 6 April 2008. This was not amended in Darling's 2008 budget. Although the majority of taxpayers would be marginally better off as a result of these changes, around 5,100,000 low earners (including those earning less than £18,000 annually) would have been worse off. On 18 October 2007, the Treasury released statistics which established that childless people on low incomes could lose up to £200 a year as a result of the changes, while parents and those earning more than £20,000 would gain money.

Increasing political backlash about the additional tax burden for some put immense pressure onto the government; including Darling with Brown facing criticism from his own Parliamentary Labour Party. In May 2008 Darling announced he would help low-paid workers hit by the scrapping of the 10p rate, by raising that year's personal tax allowance by £600 funded by borrowing an extra £2.7 billion.

==== Stimulus spending ====
To boost falling demand, the government announced an additional £20 billion spending package. Subsequently, Mervyn King, governor of the Bank of England, warned the government against further stimulus spending, due to insecure public finances.

== Later activities ==
Following the defeat of the Labour Party at the 2010 general election, Darling announced that he intended to leave frontbench politics. He endorsed David Miliband to succeed Brown as Leader of the Labour Party in the 2010 leadership election.

On 17 May 2010, it was reported that he stated: "It has been an honour and a tremendous privilege but I believe it is time for me to return to the backbenches from where I shall look after, with great pride, the constituents of Edinburgh South West." Darling suggested on 7 September 2010 on Daily Politics that he was intending only to take a "year out" and might possibly reconsider his future.

=== Expenses claims ===
In May 2009, The Daily Telegraph reported that Darling changed the designation of his second home four times in four years, allowing him to claim for the costs of his family home in Edinburgh, and to buy and furnish a flat in London including the cost of stamp duty and other legal fees. Darling said that "the claims were made within House of Commons rules".

Nick Clegg, Leader of the Liberal Democrats, criticised him by saying: "given that very unique responsibility that [Darling] has [as Chancellor], it's simply impossible for him to continue in that role when such very major question marks are being raised about his financial affairs". A former Scottish Labour chairman and treasurer described Darling's position as "untenable" and said that "[Darling] certainly shouldn't be in the Cabinet".

On 1 June 2009, Darling apologised "unreservedly" about a mistaken claim for £700, which he had agreed to repay. He was supported by the Prime Minister, who referred to the incident as an inadvertent mistake.

In 2010, he resigned from the Faculty of Advocates as they were investigating a complaint about his expenses claims. Darling denied any connection between the two events.

=== Better Together campaign ===
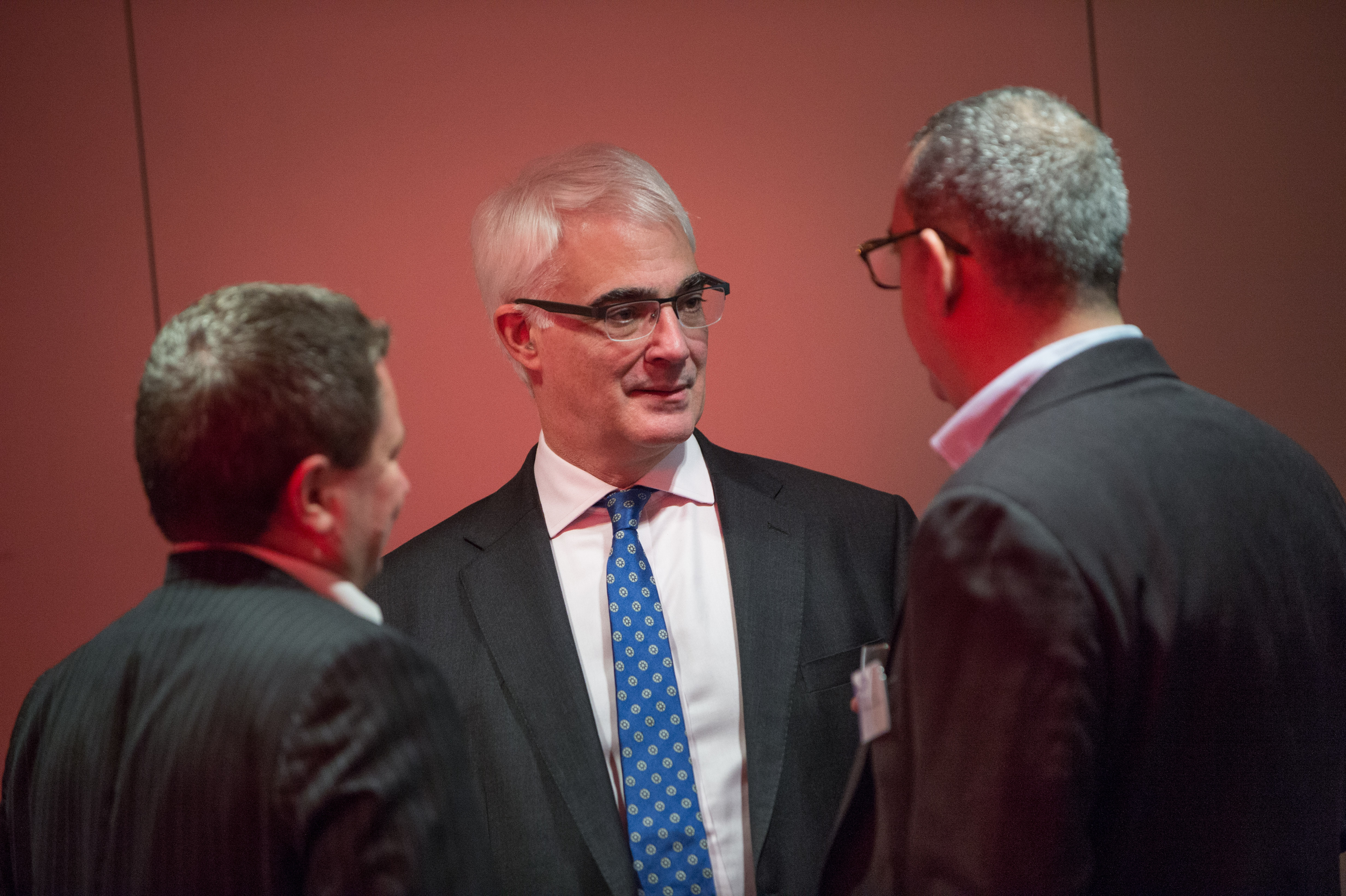
Darling in 2014

Darling was the chairman and one of the directors of the Better Together campaign, which campaigned for a "No" vote in the 2014 referendum on Scottish independence. He was involved in the campaign's launch in June 2012, delivered a speech on the subject in the annual John P Mackintosh lecture in November 2012, and addressed a fringe meeting at the Scottish Conservative Conference in June 2013. In August 2014, Darling took part in Salmond & Darling: The Debate and Scotland Decides: Salmond versus Darling, televised debates with first minister Alex Salmond on the pros and cons of Scottish Independence.

Darling was criticised by some Scottish Labour MPs and supporters who believed that working with Conservatives on the Better Together campaign might damage Labour's prospects in Scotland. In November 2014 he announced he would not recontest his seat at the 2015 general election. Subsequently Labour lost all but one of their seats in Scotland to the SNP, with swings of over 30% in several seats, including a UK record swing of 39.3% against Labour in Glasgow North East. Labour also lost Darling's former constituency to Joanna Cherry of the SNP.

=== House of Lords ===
Darling was nominated for a life peerage in the 2015 Dissolution Honours, becoming Baron Darling of Roulanish, of Great Bernera in the County of Ross and Cromarty on 1 December 2015. He was introduced to the House of Lords on 10 December 2015. Darling retired from the Lords on 28 July 2020, citing distance and the COVID-19 pandemic.

== Personal life, illness and death ==
Darling had a brief marriage when young, and was then married to former journalist Margaret McQueen Vaughan from 1986 until his death; the couple had a son and a daughter. Vaughan worked for Radio Forth, the Daily Record and Glasgow Herald until Labour's election victory in 1997. Darling said he had smoked cannabis in his youth. He enjoyed listening to Pink Floyd, Coldplay, Leonard Cohen and the Killers.

Darling died of cancer at Western General Hospital in Edinburgh, on 30 November 2023, at the age of 70. There were widespread tributes from politicians from different political parties. Former prime minister Gordon Brown praised his "integrity" and "wise judgement". A memorial service for Darling at St Mary's Episcopal Cathedral in Edinburgh the following month was attended by many present and former political leaders, including Sir Tony Blair, Gordon Brown, George Osborne, Humza Yousaf and Sir Keir Starmer. Future Labour Chancellor Rachel Reeves also paid tribute, saying that Darling had been a mentor to her.

== Notes ==
Parliament of the United Kingdom
Preceded by Alex Fletcher	Member of Parliament for Edinburgh Central; 1987–2005	Constituency abolished
New constituency	Member of Parliament for Edinburgh South West; 2005–2015	Succeeded by Joanna Cherry
Political offices
Preceded by William Waldegrave	Chief Secretary to the Treasury; 1997–1998	Succeeded by Stephen Byers
Preceded by Harriet Harman	Secretary of State for Work and Pensions; 1998–2002	Succeeded by Andrew Smith
Preceded by Stephen Byers as Secretary of State for Transport, Local Government and the Regions	Secretary of State for Transport; 2002–2006	Succeeded by Douglas Alexander
Preceded by Helen Liddell	Secretary of State for Scotland; 2003–2006	Succeeded by Douglas Alexander
Preceded by Alan Johnson	President of the Board of Trade; 2006–2007	Succeeded by John Hutton
Preceded by Alan Johnson	Secretary of State for Trade and Industry; 2006–2007	Succeeded by John Hutton as Secretary of State for Business, Enterprise and Regulatory Reform
Preceded by Gordon Brown	Chancellor of the Exchequer; 2007–2010	Succeeded by George Osborne
Preceded by Gordon Brown	Second Lord of the Treasury; 2007–2010	Succeeded by George Osborne
