= Scottish Westminster constituencies =

Scottish constituencies of the House of Commons of the Parliament of Great Britain

Overview
1708 to 1832
1832 to 1868
1868 to 1885
1885 to 1918
1918 to 1950
1950 to 1955
1955 to 1974
1974 to 1983
1983 to 1997
1997 to 2005
2005 to 2024
since 2024

Scottish Westminster constituencies are the Scottish constituencies of the House of Commons of the Parliament of the United Kingdom (since 1801) and of its predecessor the Parliament of Great Britain (from 1708 to 1801), both meeting at the Palace of Westminster. Constituency boundaries have changed on various occasions, and are now subject to both periodical and ad hoc reviews of the Boundary Commission for Scotland.

Since 1950 each Scottish constituency has been either a burgh constituency or a county constituency, defined by geographic boundaries and representing a seat for one Member of Parliament (MP). Prior to 1950, there were also university constituencies and constituencies representing two or three parliamentary seats.

Scottish local government counties and burghs were abolished in 1975. A burgh constituency is now one with a predominantly urban electorate, and a county constituency is one with more than a token rural electorate.

Counties and burghs were replaced with two-tier regions and districts and unitary islands council areas, and the regions and districts were replaced with unitary council areas in 1996.

The history of constituency boundaries can be divided into 12 distinct periods, as below, each starting with the date of a general election when a new set of boundaries was first used.

== 1708 to 1832 ==
Scottish Westminster constituencies, 1707–1832.

As a result of the union of Scotland with England and Wales and the creation of the Parliament of Great Britain in 1707, Scotland had 48 constituencies representing seats for 45 MPs in the House of Commons of the new parliament at Westminster. Westminster was previously the meeting place for the Parliament of England, which covered both England and Wales.

Scottish Westminster constituencies were first used in the 1708 general election. Prior to that election Scotland was represented in the new parliament by MPs who were co-opted as commissioners of the former Parliament of Scotland.

In the Parliament of Great Britain, Scotland had 15 burgh constituencies and 33 county constituencies, with each representing a seat for one MP. The county constituencies included, however, three pairs of alternating constituencies, so that only one member of a pair was represented at any one time. Therefore, Scotland had more constituencies than seats. With the exception of Edinburgh, the burgh constituencies consisted of districts of burghs.

1708 boundaries were used for all subsequent elections of the Parliament of Great Britain.

The creation of the Parliament of the United Kingdom in 1801 was a merger of the Parliament of Ireland with the Parliament of Great Britain. The first general election of this new parliament was the general election of 1802, and there was at that stage no change to the boundaries of any pre-existing Westminster constituency.

1802 boundaries were used also in the general elections of 1806, 1807, 1812, 1818, 1820, 1826, 1830 and 1831.

== 1832 to 1868 ==
For the 1832 general election, Scottish Westminster constituencies were redefined by the Representation of the People (Scotland) Act 1832.

As a result of the legislation, there were 21 burgh constituencies and 30 county constituencies. Except for Edinburgh and Glasgow, which were two-seat constituencies, each Scottish constituency represented a seat for one MP. Therefore, Scotland had 53 parliamentary seats.

The constituencies related nominally to counties and burghs, but boundaries for parliamentary purposes were not necessarily those for other purposes. 14 of the burgh constituencies were districts of burghs.

1832 boundaries were used also in the general elections of 1835, 1837, 1841, 1847, 1852, 1857, 1859 and 1865.

== 1868 to 1885 ==
For the 1868 general election Scottish Westminster constituencies were redefined by the Representation of the People (Scotland) Act 1868. For the same general election, boundaries in England were redefined by the Representation of the People Act 1867 and there was, effectively, a transfer of seven parliamentary seats from England to Scotland.

As a result of the legislation, Scotland had 22 burgh constituencies, 32 county constituencies and two university constituencies. Except for Edinburgh, Dundee and Glasgow, each Scottish constituency represented a seat for one MP. Edinburgh and Dundee represented two seats each, and Glasgow represented three seats. Therefore, Scotland was entitled to 60 MPs.

The constituencies again related nominally to counties and burghs but, again, boundaries for parliamentary purposes were not necessarily those for other purposes.

1868 boundaries were used also in the general elections of 1874 and 1880.

== 1885 to 1918 ==
The Redistribution of Seats Act 1885 redefined the boundaries of English, Scottish and Welsh constituencies, and the new boundaries were first used in the 1885 general election. The boundaries of Irish constituencies were not affected.

In Scotland, as a result of the legislation, there were 32 burgh constituencies, 37 county constituencies and two university constituencies. Except for Dundee, which was a two-seat constituency, each Scottish constituency represented a seat for one MP. Therefore, Scotland had 72 parliamentary seats.

The 1885 legislation detailed boundary changes but did not detail boundaries for all constituencies. For a complete picture of boundaries in Scotland, it has to be read in conjunction with the Representation of the People (Scotland) Act 1832 and the Representation of the People (Scotland) Act 1868.

As under legislation of 1832 and 1868, constituencies related nominally to counties and burghs, but boundaries for parliamentary purposes were not necessarily those for other purposes. Also, boundaries for other purposes were altered by the Local Government (Scotland) Act 1889 and by later related legislation.

1885 boundaries were used also in the general elections of 1886, 1892, 1895, 1900, 1906, January 1910 and December 1910.

== 1918 to 1950 ==
The Representation of the People Act 1918 redefined constituency boundaries in relation to local government boundaries of the time, and the new constituency boundaries were first used in the 1918 general election.

Scotland had 32 burgh constituencies, 38 county constituencies and one university constituency. One burgh constituency, Dundee, represented seats for two MPs, and the university constituency, Combined Scottish Universities, represented seats for three MPs. Each of the others elected one MP. Therefore, the legislation provided parliamentary seats for a total of 74 Scottish MPs.

1918 boundaries were used also in the general elections of 1922, 1923, 1924, 1929, 1931, 1935 and 1945.

== 1950 to 1955 ==
Scottish Westminster constituencies, 1950–1955.

For the 1950 general election, under the Representation of the People Act 1948 and the House of Commons (Redistribution of Seats) Act 1949, Scotland had 32 burgh constituencies and 39 county constituencies, with each electing one MP. Therefore, Scotland had 71 parliamentary seats.

Each constituency was entirely within a county or a grouping of two counties, or was if the cities of Aberdeen, Dundee, Edinburgh and Glasgow are regarded as belonging, respectively to the county of Aberdeen, the county of Angus, the county of Midlothian and the county of Lanark.

For the 1951 general election there were changes to the boundaries of six Scottish constituencies, but there was no change to county groupings, to the total numbers of constituencies and MPs, or to constituency names.

== 1955 to 1974 ==
Scottish Westminster constituencies, 1955–1974.

The results of the First Periodical Review became effective for the 1955 general election.

The review defined 32 burgh constituencies and 39 county constituencies, with each electing one MP. Therefore, Scotland had 71 parliamentary seats.

Each constituency was entirely within a county or a grouping of two or three counties, or was if the cities of Aberdeen, Dundee, Edinburgh and Glasgow are regarded as belonging, respectively to the county of Aberdeen, the county of Angus, the county of Midlothian and the county of Lanark.

1955 boundaries were used also for the general election of 1959.

There were changes to the boundaries of nine Scottish constituencies for the 1964 general election but there was no change to county groupings, to the total numbers of constituencies and MPs, or to constituency names.

1964 boundaries were used also for the 1966 and 1970 general elections.

== 1974 to 1983 ==
The results of the Second Periodical Review, concluded in 1969, and of a subsequent interim review, concluded in 1972, became effective for the February 1974 general election.

The reviews defined 29 burgh constituencies and 42 county constituencies, with each electing one MP. Therefore, Scotland had 71 parliamentary seats.

Each constituency was entirely within a county or a grouping of two or three counties.

February 1974 boundaries were used also in the October 1974 and 1979 general elections.

== 1983 to 1997 ==
Scottish Westminster constituencies, 1983–1997.

The results of the Third Periodical Review became effective for the 1983 general election.

The review defined 30 burgh constituencies and 42 county constituencies, with each electing one MP. Therefore, Scotland had 72 parliamentary seats.

In 1975, Scottish counties and burghs had been abolished for local government purposes, under the Local Government (Scotland) Act 1973, and the Third Periodical Review took account of new local government boundaries, which defined two-tier regions and districts and unitary islands council areas. No new constituency straddled a regional boundary, and no islands council area was divided between two constituencies.

The boundary commission was required to designate each new constituency as either burgh or county but had no predetermined basis on which to do so. The commission took the view that each constituency with more than a token rural electorate would be a county constituency, and others, predominantly urban, would be burgh constituencies.

1983 boundaries were used also in the 1987 and 1992 general elections.

== 1997 to 2005 ==
Scottish Westminster constituencies, 1997–2005.

The results of the Fourth Periodical Review of the Boundary Commission for Scotland became effective, as a result of Order in Council SI 1995 No 1037 (S.90), for the 1997 general election.

The review defined 28 burgh constituencies and 44 county constituencies, with each electing one MP. Therefore, Scotland had 72 parliamentary seats.

Constituencies were defined in reference to the boundaries of local government regions and districts and islands areas effective on 1 June 1994, and each constituency was entirely within a region or a grouping of two or entirely within an islands area or a grouping of two. However, under the Local Government etc (Scotland) Act 1994, the regions and districts were abolished in favour of new council areas in 1996, the year before the new constituencies were first used in an election.

1997 boundaries were used also in the 2001 general election.

== 2005 to 2024 ==
Scottish Westminster constituencies, 2005–2024

The results of the Fifth Periodical Review became effective in Scotland for the 2005 general election.

The review defined 19 burgh constituencies and 40 county constituencies, with each electing one MP. Therefore, Scotland had 59 parliamentary seats.

Each constituency was entirely within a council area or a grouping of two or three council areas.

== Since 2024 ==
Scottish Westminster constituencies from 2024

The results of the 2023 review of Westminster constituencies became effective in Scotland for the 2024 general election.

The review defined 17 burgh constituencies and 40 county constituencies, with each electing one MP. Therefore, Scotland has 57 parliamentary seats.

Each constituency is entirely within a council area or a grouping of two or three council areas.

== See also ==
- Scottish Parliament constituencies and electoral regions
- Constitutional reform in the United Kingdom
- Glasgow parliamentary constituencies
- List of Great Britain and UK Parliament constituencies in Scotland from 1707 for graphical representation by party
