= Maria Fyfe =

Scottish politician and educator (1938–2020)

Member of Parliament for Glasgow Maryhill
- In office 11 June 1987 – 14 May 2001
- Preceded by: James Craigen
- Succeeded by: Ann McKechin

Personal details
- Born: Catherine Maria O'Neill; 25 November 1938 Glasgow, Scotland
- Died: 3 December 2020 (aged 82) Glasgow, Scotland
- Party: Labour (1960–76; 1977–2020); SLP (1976–77)
- Spouse: James Joseph Fyfe (m. 1964; died 1986)
- Children: 2
- Education: University of Strathclyde
- Occupation: Politician; educator

Catherine Mary "Maria" Fyfe (née O'Neill; 25 November 1938 – 3 December 2020), known as Maria Fyfe, was a Scottish politician and educator who served as Member of Parliament for Glasgow Maryhill from 1987 to 2001.

She was Deputy Shadow Minister for Women from 1988 to 1991, Convener of the Scottish Group of Labour MPs from 1991 to 1992 and front bench spokesperson for Scotland from 1992 to 1995. Fyfe campaigned for 50-50 representation of women in the Scottish Parliament.

== Background ==
Catherine Maria O'Neill was born on 25 November 1938 in Glasgow, where she grew up in Gorbals, the daughter of James O'Neill, a clerk, tram driver and shopworker, and Margaret Lacey, a former shop assistant. She briefly spent time in Ireland during the Second World War before returning to Glasgow, and was educated at Notre Dame High School in the city. In 1964, she married James Fyfe; they had two sons. She returned to education as a mature student, studying Economic History at the University of Strathclyde and graduating in 1975 with a BA (Hons). She worked as a senior lecturer in the Trade Union Studies Unit at Glasgow Central College of Commerce from 1978 to 1987.

=== Early political career ===
Fyfe became a member of the Labour Party in 1960. She and her husband James, a journalist with the Glasgow Herald, left Labour to join Jim Sillars' breakaway pro-devolution Scottish Labour Party (SLP) in 1976, but the internal strife that plagued the new venture led to her expulsion and return to her former party within a year. In 1980 she was a Labour candidate in that year's Glasgow District Council election, where she took the Blairdardie ward from the Scottish National Party with a majority of 763 votes. On the council, she served firstly as Vice-Convener of the Finance Committee (1980–84) and then as Convener of the Personnel Committee until 1987, when she was elected to Parliament. She was a member of Labour's Scottish Executive Committee from 1981 to 1988.

== Parliamentary career ==
At the 1987 general election, Fyfe was returned to Parliament as Member for Glasgow Maryhill, a position she occupied until the 2001 general election. She served as Deputy Shadow Minister for Women from 1988 to 1991, Convener of the Scottish Group of Labour MPs from 1991 to 1992, and front bench spokesperson for Scotland from 1992 to 1995. She did not stand for reelection at the 2001 General Election and was succeeded by Ann McKechin. Fyfe was awarded an honorary D.Univ. by the University of Glasgow in 2002.

She was quoted as saying: "I am proudest of having been involved in the 50-50 campaign to ensure that the Scottish Parliament started life with an almost equal representation of women, up there with the Scandinavian countries". She was also involved in opposing the poll tax in both England and Scotland, and launched a campaign against employee blacklisting in 1988. After standing down Fyfe continued to campaign politically including on the issue of homelessness. She also chaired the campaign to erect a statue of Glasgow councillor and rent strike campaigner Mary Barbour.

== Later life ==
Fyfe was interviewed in 2012 as part of The History of Parliament's oral history project. She wrote two autobiographies, the first entitled A Problem Like Maria describing her work as an MP, and a second book Singing in the Streets, about her life growing up in the Gorbals in the aftermath of the Second World War, as well as her earlier political career. She also wrote another political book, Women Saying No: Making a Positive Case Against Independence, in advance of the Scottish independence referendum in 2014.

Fyfe had two sons and four grandchildren. On 3 December 2020, she died at Queen Elizabeth University Hospital from complications of COVID-19 during the pandemic, aged 82.

Parliament of the United Kingdom
Preceded by James Craigen	Member of Parliament for Glasgow Maryhill; 1987–2001	Succeeded by Ann McKechin
