= Glasgow Maryhill (UK Parliament constituency) =

Parliamentary constituency in the United Kingdom, 1918–2005

- Former burgh constituency for the House of Commons
- Subdivision: County of city of Glasgow; City of Glasgow district Glasgow City council area

1918–2005
- Seats: One
- Created from: Glasgow Partick
- Replaced by: Glasgow North; Glasgow North East

Glasgow Maryhill was a parliamentary constituency represented in the House of Commons of the Parliament of the United Kingdom from 1918 to 2005 when it was subsumed into the new Glasgow North and Glasgow North East constituencies. It elected one Member of Parliament (MP) using the first-past-the-post voting system.

== Boundaries ==
1918–1950: "That portion of the city which is bounded by a line commencing at a point on the municipal boundary at the centre line of the North British Railway (Edinburgh and Glasgow Line) about 327 yards north of the centre of Hawthorn Street, where the said North British Railway intersects that street, thence south-eastward and southward along the centre of the said North British Railway to the centre line of Keppochhill Road, thence south-westward and westward along the centre line of Keppochhill Road to the centre line of Saracen Street, thence south-westward along the centre line of Possil Road to the centre line of the Forth and Clyde Canal, thence north-westward along the centre line of the Forth and Clyde Canal to a point in line with the centre line of Well Road, thence south-westward along the centre line of Well Road to the centre line of New City Road, thence westward along the centre line of Raeberry Street and Carlton Gardens to the centre line of Belmont Street, thence south-westward along the centre line of Belmont Street to the centre line of the River Kelvin, thence northwestward along the centre line of the River Kelvin to its intersection with the municipal boundary, thence north-eastward and south-eastward along the municipal boundary to the point of commencement."

1950–1974: The County of the City of Glasgow wards of Maryhill and Ruchill.

1974–1983: The County of the City of Glasgow wards of Cowcaddens, Maryhill, and Ruchill.

1983–1997: The City of Glasgow District electoral divisions of Milton/Ruchill, North Kelvin/Woodlands, and Summerston/Maryhill.

1997–2005: The City of Glasgow District electoral divisions of Milton/Possil, Summerston/Maryhill, and Woodside/North Kelvinside.

== Members of Parliament ==
Election	Member	Party
1918	Sir William Mitchell-Thomson	Unionist
1922	John William Muir	Labour
1924	James Couper	Unionist
1929	John Clarke	Labour
1931	Douglas Jamieson	Conservative
1935	John Davidson	Labour
1945	Willie Hannan	Labour
Feb 1974	Jim Craigen	Labour Co-operative
1987	Maria Fyfe	Labour
2001	Ann McKechin	Labour
2005	constituency abolished	

== Elections ==
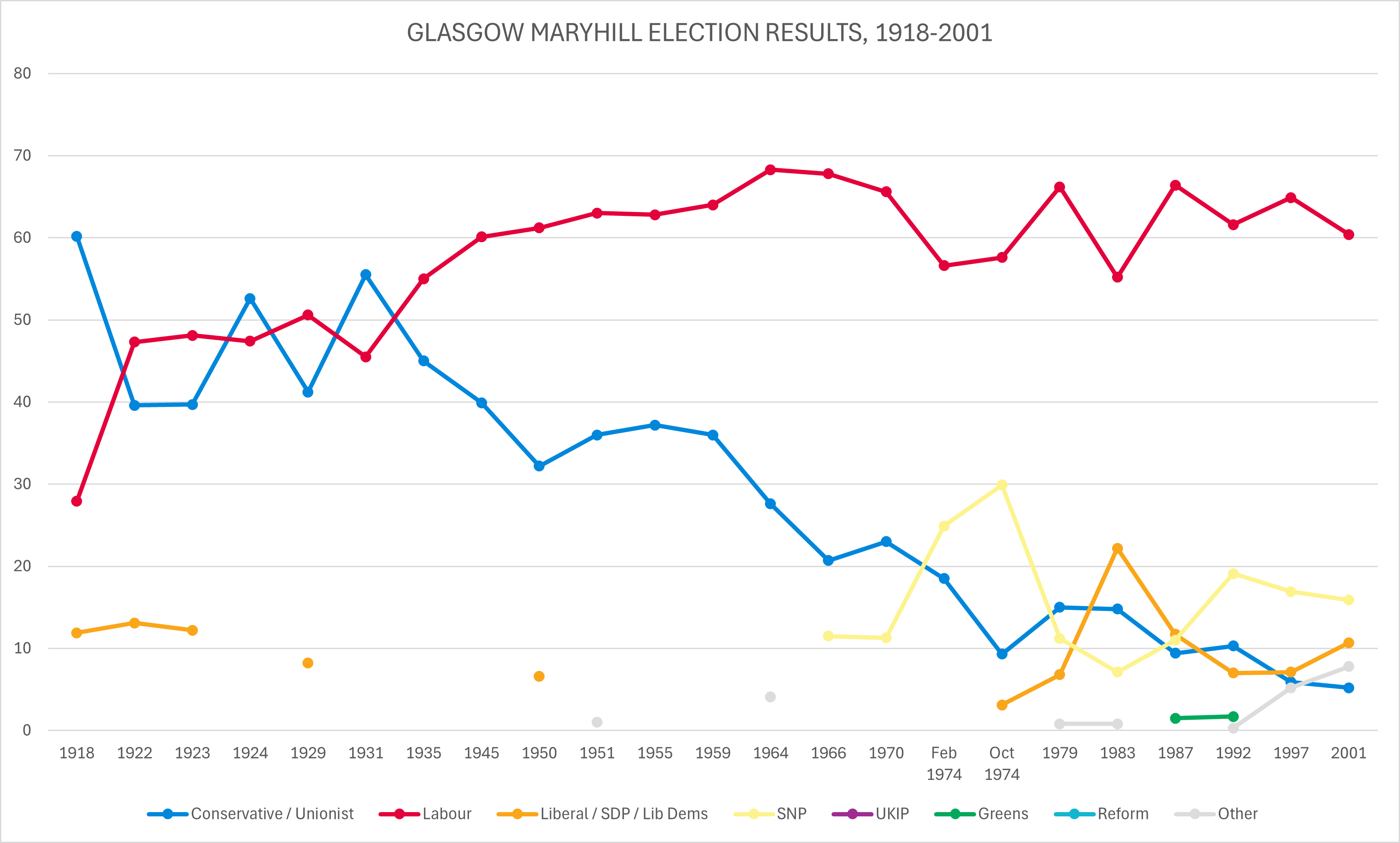
Election results 1918-2001

=== Elections in the 2000s ===
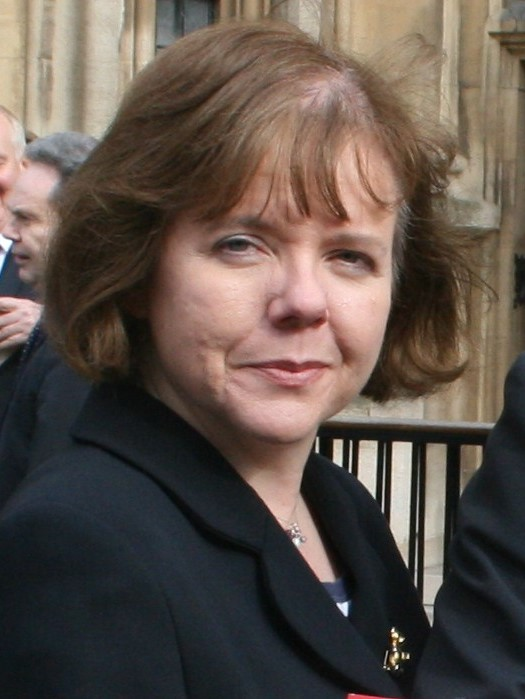
McKechin

General election 2001: Glasgow Maryhill
Party	Candidate	Votes	%	±%
Labour	Ann McKechin	13,420	60.4	−4.5
SNP	Alex Dingwall	3,532	15.9	−1.0
Liberal Democrats	Stuart Callison	2,372	10.7	+3.6
Scottish Socialist	Gordon Scott	1,745	7.8	+6.4
Conservative	Gawain Towler	1,162	5.2	−0.7
Majority		9,888	44.5	−3.5
Turnout		22,231	40.1	−16.3
Labour hold		Swing		

=== Elections in the 1990s ===
General election 1997: Glasgow Maryhill
Party	Candidate	Votes	%	±%
Labour	Maria Fyfe	19,301	64.9	+3.3
SNP	John Wailes	5,037	16.9	−2.2
Liberal Democrats	Elspeth Attwooll	2,119	7.1	+0.1
Conservative	Stuart Baldwin	1,747	5.9	−4.4
Natural Law	Lorna Blair	651	2.2	+1.9
Scottish Socialist	Mandy Baker	409	1.4	New
ProLife Alliance	Jahangir Hanif	344	1.2	New
Referendum	Roderick Paterson	77	0.3	New
Independent	Steve Johnstone	36	0.1	New
Majority		14,264	48.0	+5.5
Turnout		29,721	56.4	−8.8
Labour hold		Swing		

General election 1992: Glasgow Maryhill
Party	Candidate	Votes	%	±%
Labour	Maria Fyfe	19,452	61.6	−4.8
SNP	Clifford Williamson	6,033	19.1	+8.1
Conservative	John P. Godfrey	3,248	10.3	+0.9
Liberal Democrats	Jim Alexander	2,215	7.0	−3.7
Green	Phil O'Brien	530	1.7	+0.2
Natural Law	Michael Henderson	78	0.3	New
Majority		13,419	42.5	−12.2
Turnout		31,556	65.2	−2.3
Labour hold		Swing		

=== Elections in the 1980s ===
General election 1987: Glasgow Maryhill
Party	Candidate	Votes	%	±%
Labour	Maria Fyfe	23,482	66.4	+11.2
Liberal	Elspeth Attwooll	4,118	11.7	−10.5
SNP	Gavin Roberts	3,895	11.0	+3.9
Conservative	Simon Kirk	3,307	9.4	−5.4
Green	David Spaven	539	1.5	New
Majority		19,364	54.7	+21.7
Turnout		35,341	67.5	+2.0
Labour hold		Swing		

General election 1983: Glasgow Maryhill
Party	Candidate	Votes	%	±%
Labour Co-op	James Craigen	18,724	55.2	−11.0
Liberal	Elspeth Attwooll	7,521	22.2	+15.4
Conservative	Joseph Gibbs	5,014	14.8	−0.2
SNP	Iain Morrison	2,408	7.1	−4.1
Communist	Peter Smith	274	0.8	0.0
Majority		11,203	33.0	−18.2
Turnout		33,941	65.5	−2.2
Labour Co-op hold		Swing		

=== Elections in the 1970s ===
General election 1979: Glasgow Maryhill
Party	Candidate	Votes	%	±%
Labour Co-op	James Craigen	22,602	66.2	+8.6
Conservative	M. White	5,106	15.0	+5.7
SNP	David McGlashan	3,812	11.2	−18.7
Liberal	Elspeth Attwooll	2,332	6.8	+3.7
Communist	Peter Smith	287	0.8	New
Majority		17,496	51.2	+23.5
Turnout		33,599	67.7	+1.8
Labour Co-op hold		Swing		

General election October 1974: Glasgow Maryhill
Party	Candidate	Votes	%	±%
Labour Co-op	James Craigen	19,589	57.6	+1.0
SNP	Angus McIntosh	10,171	29.9	+5.0
Conservative	J. S. Younger	3,160	9.3	−9.2
Liberal	Elspeth Attwooll	1,063	3.1	New
Majority		9,418	27.7	−4.0
Turnout		33,983	65.9	−4.1
Labour Co-op hold		Swing		

General election February 1974: Glasgow Maryhill
Party	Candidate	Votes	%	±%
Labour Co-op	James Craigen	20,303	56.6	−9.0
SNP	Angus McIntosh	8,920	24.9	+13.6
Conservative	S. Taylor	6,625	18.5	−4.5
Majority		11,383	31.7	−10.9
Turnout		35,848	70.0	+5.2
Labour Co-op hold		Swing		

General election 1970: Glasgow Maryhill
Party	Candidate	Votes	%	±%
Labour	William Hannan	18,925	65.6	−2.2
Conservative	Alexander K. R. Murchison	6,638	23.0	+2.3
SNP	A. Cameron W. Aitken	3,273	11.3	−0.2
Majority		12,287	42.6	−4.6
Turnout		28,836	63.8	0.0
Labour hold		Swing		

=== Elections in the 1960s ===
General election 1966: Glasgow Maryhill
Party	Candidate	Votes	%	±%
Labour	William Hannan	19,936	67.8	−0.5
Conservative	Richard S. Hay	6,075	20.7	−5.9
SNP	Hugh MacDonald	3,387	11.5	New
Majority		13,861	47.2	+6.5
Turnout		29,398	63.8	−6.7
Labour hold		Swing		

General election 1964: Glasgow Maryhill
Party	Candidate	Votes	%	±%
Labour	William Hannan	20,796	68.3	+4.3
Unionist	Norman Joseph Adamson	8,403	27.6	−8.4
Anti-Vivisection	Gabriel A Barlow	1,231	4.1	New
Majority		12,393	40.7	+12.7
Turnout		30,430	70.5	−3.2
Labour hold		Swing		

=== Elections in the 1950s ===
General election 1959: Glasgow Maryhill
Party	Candidate	Votes	%	±%
Labour	William Hannan	21,893	64.0	+1.2
Unionist	Norman Joseph Adamson	12,311	36.0	−1.2
Majority		9,582	28.0	+2.4
Turnout		34,204	73.7	+3.8
Labour hold		Swing		

General election 1955: Glasgow Maryhill
Party	Candidate	Votes	%	±%
Labour	William Hannan	21,174	62.8	−0.2
Unionist	Archibald Angus Bell	12,536	37.2	+1.2
Majority		8,638	25.6	−1.5
Turnout		33,710	69.9	−10.8
Labour hold		Swing		

General election 1951: Glasgow Maryhill
Party	Candidate	Votes	%	±%
Labour	William Hannan	22,912	63.0	+1.8
Unionist	Paul Thomas Cowcher	13,076	36.0	+3.8
Independent	A. E. Pickard	356	1.0	New
Majority		9,836	27.1	−1.9
Turnout		36,344	80.7	+0.7
Labour hold		Swing		

General election 1950: Glasgow Maryhill
Party	Candidate	Votes	%	±%
Labour	William Hannan	21,990	61.2	+1.1
Unionist	Janet Sutherland Murray	11,559	32.2	−7.7
Liberal	Elizabeth Taylor Cowan	2,375	6.6	New
Majority		10,431	29.0	+8.8
Turnout		35,924	80.0	+13.0
Labour hold		Swing		

=== Elections in the 1940s ===
General election 1945: Glasgow Maryhill
Party	Candidate	Votes	%	±%
Labour	William Hannan	23,595	60.1	+5.1
Unionist	William Ross McLean	15,693	39.9	−5.1
Majority		7,902	20.2	+10.2
Turnout		39,288	67.0	
Labour hold		Swing		

=== Elections in the 1930s ===
General election 1935: Glasgow Maryhill
Party	Candidate	Votes	%	±%
Labour	John James Davidson	21,706	55.0	+10.6
Unionist	Ian Clark Hutchison	17,735	45.0	−10.5
Majority		3,971	10.0	N/A
Turnout		39,441		
Labour gain from Unionist		Swing		

General election 1931: Glasgow Maryhill
Party	Candidate	Votes	%	±%
Unionist	Douglas Jamieson	20,710	55.5	+9.3
Labour	John Clarke	16,613	44.4	−8.2
Majority		4,097	11.1	N/A
Turnout		37,323		
Unionist gain from Labour		Swing		

=== Elections in the 1920s ===
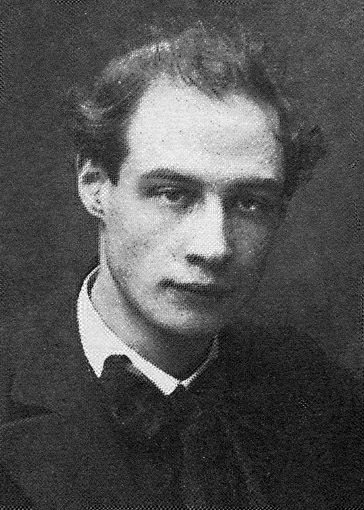
Clarke

General election 1929: Glasgow Maryhill
Party	Candidate	Votes	%	±%
Labour	John Clarke	18,311	50.6	+3.2
Unionist	James Couper	14,922	41.2	−11.4
Liberal	Herbert Taylor Cape	2,955	8.2	New
Majority		3,389	9.4	N/A
Turnout		36,188	79.8	−4.4
Registered electors		45,333		
Labour gain from Unionist		Swing	+7.3	

General election 1924: Glasgow Maryhill
Party	Candidate	Votes	%	±%
Unionist	James Couper	15,460	52.6	+12.9
Labour	John Muir	13,947	47.4	−0.7
Majority		1,513	5.2	N/A
Turnout		29,407	84.2	+7.1
Registered electors		34,930		
Unionist gain from Labour		Swing	+6.8	

General election 1923: Glasgow Maryhill
Party	Candidate	Votes	%	±%
Labour	John Muir	12,508	48.1	+0.8
Unionist	James Couper	10,342	39.7	+0.1
Liberal	Walter Crawford Smith	3,179	12.2	−0.9
Majority		2,166	8.4	+0.7
Turnout		26,029	77.1	−4.2
Registered electors		33,781		
Labour hold		Swing	+0.4	

Swan

General election 1922: Glasgow Maryhill
Party	Candidate	Votes	%	±%
Labour	John Muir	13,058	47.3	+19.4
Unionist	William Mitchell-Thomson	10,951	39.6	−20.6
Liberal	Annie S. Swan	3,617	13.1	+1.2
Majority		2,107	7.7	N/A
Turnout		27,626	81.3	+24.1
Registered electors		33,991		
Labour gain from Unionist		Swing	+20.0	

=== Elections in the 1910s ===
Watt

General election 1918: Glasgow Maryhill
Party		Candidate	Votes	%	±%
C	Unionist	William Mitchell-Thomson	11,913	60.2	
	Labour	John Muir	5,531	27.9	
	Liberal	Harry Watt	2,363	11.9	
Majority			6,382	32.3	
Turnout			19,807	57.2	
Registered electors			34,622		
	Unionist win (new seat)				
C indicates candidate endorsed by the coalition government.
