= Patrick Grady =

Scottish politician (born 1980)

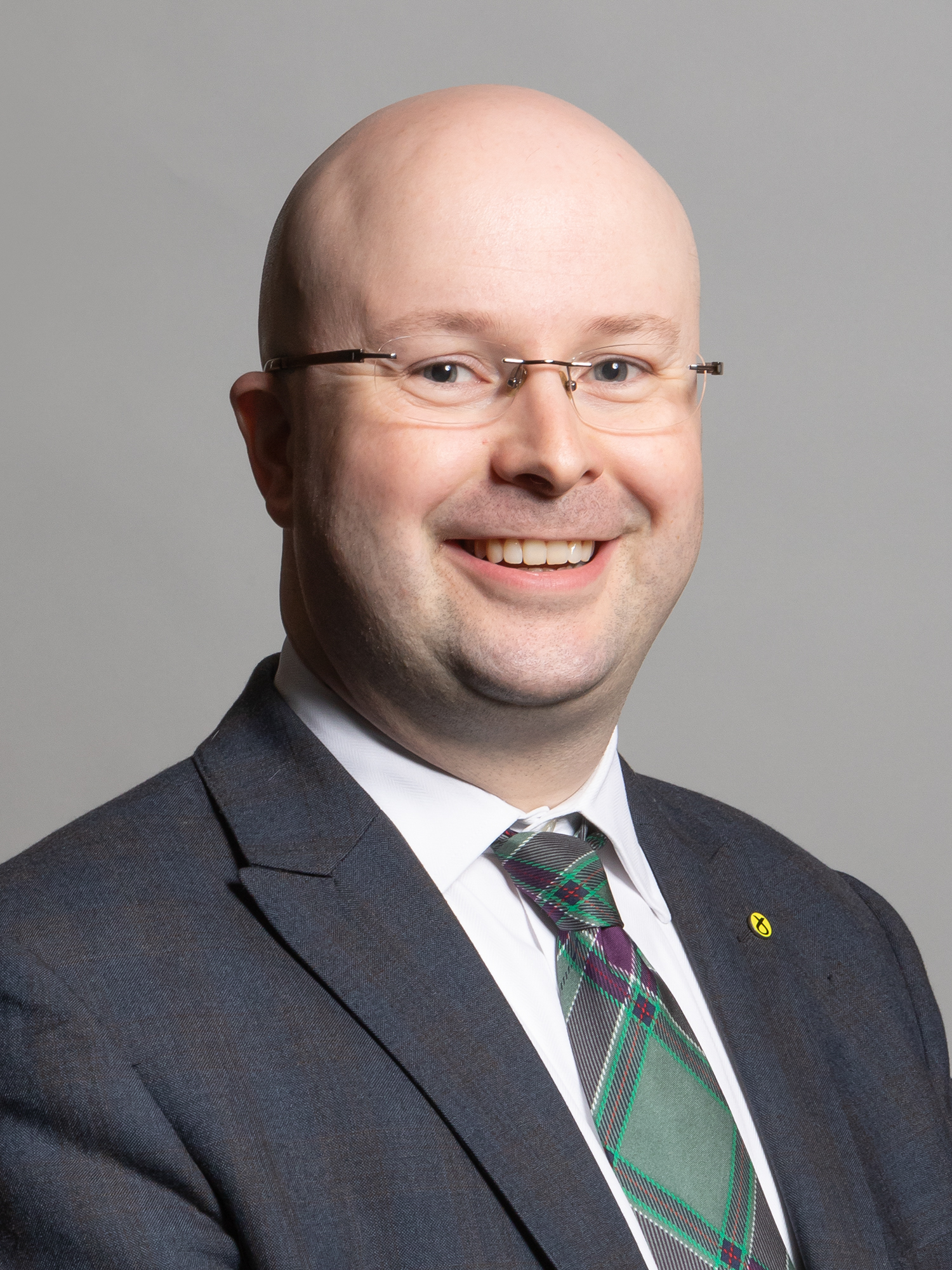
- Official portrait, 2019

Chief Whip of the Scottish National Party in the House of Commons
- In office 9 June 2017 – 9 March 2021
- Leader: Ian Blackford
- Preceded by: Michael Weir
- Succeeded by: Owen Thompson

Member of Parliament for Glasgow North
- In office 7 May 2015 – 30 May 2024
- Preceded by: Ann McKechin
- Succeeded by: Martin Rhodes

Personal details
- Born: Patrick John Grady; 5 February 1980 (age 46) Edinburgh, Scotland
- Party: Scottish National Party (since 1997)
- Other political affiliations: Independent (2022)
- Education: University of Strathclyde

Patrick John Grady (born 5 February 1980) is a Scottish politician. He was elected at the 2015 UK general election as the Scottish National Party Member of Parliament (MP) for Glasgow North. He was re-elected in 2017 and in 2019, but chose not to stand again in 2024.

== Early life ==
Grady was born in Edinburgh, Scotland. He was brought up in Inverness and was educated at Inverness Royal Academy, before attending the University of Strathclyde. Between 2011 and 2015, he worked as an advocacy manager for the Scottish Catholic International Aid Fund, and has also lived and worked in London and Malawi.

== Political career ==
After joining the Scottish National Party in 1997, aged seventeen, Grady stood at the 2010 general election as the SNP candidate for Glasgow North. In 2012, he was elected as National Secretary of the SNP, a role he held through re-elections until 2016. He headed the "Yes" campaign in the Kelvin area of Glasgow during the 2014 referendum on Scottish independence.

After being elected to the House of Commons, Grady was appointed as SNP Westminster Spokesperson on International Development and was a member of the House of Commons Procedure Committee until the 2017 election. Like several SNP MPs and MSPs, he also holds membership of Plaid Cymru, although this has no formal effect in the House of Commons, as he was not elected to represent that party. After the 2017 election, he was appointed as Chief Whip of the SNP Westminster Group, and was re-appointed to this role after the 2019 election, before stepping down amid scandal in 2021.

=== Recipient of offensive communications ===
In December 2021, a woman was convicted of an offence under section 127 of the Communications Act 2003 after a sheriff determined that emails that she sent to Grady in February 2021 were grossly offensive.

=== Breach of UK Parliament's Sexual Misconduct Policy ===
In March 2021, Grady stood aside from his position as Chief Whip following the SNP confirming it had received a complaint of sexual misconduct by an SNP staff member.

On 26 June 2022, he temporarily suspended his membership of the Scottish National Party (SNP), sitting as an independent MP. He resumed his membership of the SNP Westminster Group on 29 December 2022 at the conclusion of a period of suspension imposed by the SNP's Member Conduct Committee.

In June 2022, the Commissioner for Standards concluded Grady had breached sexual misconduct policy upholding a complaint that he had made "an unwanted sexual advance" to a junior member of staff by stroking their hair, neck and back. The report stated "The distinction in age, status and authority between him and the respondent is obvious and forms a key aggravating factor in the case." In the same month, a report from the Independent Expert Panel published advice that Grady should be suspended from the House of Commons.

On 13 June 2022, a leaked recording from an SNP Westminster Group meeting was leaked, in which Westminster Group Leader Ian Blackford MP was heard demanding support for Grady over his victim. The SNP initially threatened their own MPs with legal action, before SNP Leader, Nicola Sturgeon called the backing of Patrick Grady on the leaked audio as "utterly unacceptable". Amy Callaghan MP was caught on the audio, after which she issued a public apology to Grady's victim.

On 26 June 2022 it was announced that the Metropolitan Police had received an allegation against him of sexual assault by a third party, unknown to the victim. The SNP announced that he would step away from his party membership while this matter was dealt with. On 3 July 2022, the Metropolitan Police announced that following discussions with Grady's victim, they would take no further action.

On 13 June 2023 it was reported that the victim had written to First Minister Humza Yousaf, asking him to block Grady's SNP nomination as SNP candidate at the next general election. In August 2023 it was reported that Grady was not allowed to apply for vetting as a candidate: in September it was revealed Grady's name was not on the approved candidates list and so was ineligible to stand. He stepped down as MP ahead of the 2024 UK General Election.

On 12 October 2023, Lisa Cameron MP defected from the SNP to the Conservative Party in the House of Commons, hours before the result of her selection contest was to be announced, claiming that she had been "ostracised" by the SNP after claiming to have previously spoken out over the handling of misconduct by Grady.

== After Parliament ==
By the start of 2025, Grady was the head of policy of Scottish International Development Alliance, a charity funded in part by the Scottish Government.

Party political offices
Preceded by William Henderson	National Secretary of the Scottish National Party; 2012–2016	Succeeded by Dr Angus MacLeod
Parliament of the United Kingdom
Preceded by Ann McKechin	Member of Parliament for Glasgow North; 2015–2024	Succeeded by Martin Rhodes
