= James Craigen (politician) =

Scottish politician (1938–2026)

James Mark Craigen (2 August 1938 – 4 April 2026) was a Scottish Labour Co-operative politician.

== Life and career ==
Born in Glasgow on 2 August 1938, Craigen was educated at the Shawlands Academy, then at Strathclyde University and Heriot-Watt University. From 1954 to 1961 he worked as a compositor. He then spent time with the Scottish Gas Board, and from 1964 to 1968 was Head of Organisation and Social Services with the Scottish Trades Union Congress, then moved to the Scottish Business Education Council.

Craigen served on Glasgow City Council from 1965 to 1968. He stood unsuccessfully for Ayr in 1970. Subsequently he was Member of Parliament for Glasgow Maryhill from 1974 to 1987, when he stood down. His successor was Maria Fyfe. He was educated at Shawlands Academy, in Glasgow.

Chairman of the Select Committee on Employment 1982-1983, he later lived in Edinburgh working as a freelance writer and was Director and Secretary of the Scottish Federation of Housing Associations between 1988 and 1990.

Craigen married Sheena Millar in 1971. He died after a short illness on 4 April 2026, aged 87.

== Sources ==
- The Times Guide to the House of Commons, Times Newspapers Ltd, 1983
- Leigh Rayment's Peerage Pages

Parliament of the United Kingdom
Preceded by William Hannan	Member of Parliament for Glasgow Maryhill; Feb 1974–1987	Succeeded by Maria Fyfe
