= Glasgow North =

UK Parliament constituency (since 2005)

Coordinates: 55°53′39″N 4°17′34″W

- Burgh constituency for the House of Commons
- Location of Glasgow North within Scotland
- Subdivision: Glasgow City
- Electorate: 73,210 (March 2020)
- Major settlements: Gilshochill, Hillhead, Kelvindale, Maryhill, Summerston

Current constituency
- Created: 2005
- Member of Parliament: Martin Rhodes (Scottish Labour)
- Created from: Glasgow Maryhill; Glasgow Kelvin; Glasgow Anniesland

Glasgow North is a burgh constituency of the House of Commons of the Parliament of the United Kingdom (at Westminster). It elects one Member of Parliament (MP) by the first-past-the-post voting system.

It was first contested at the 2005 general election, and the incumbent MP is Martin Rhodes who was elected for Scottish Labour in 2024.

At the 2016 referendum on UK membership of the European Union, the constituency voted overwhelmingly in favour of "Remain" with 78.4%. This was the fourth-highest support for a Remain vote in any constituency in the United Kingdom.

== Boundaries ==
Map of boundaries 2005–2024

Map of boundaries from 2024

=== 2005–2024 ===
Under the Fifth Review of UK Parliament constituencies which came into effect for the 2005 general election, the boundaries were defined in accordance with the ward structure in place on 30 November 2004 as containing the Glasgow City Council wards of Firhill, Hillhead, Hyndland, Kelvindale, Maryhill, North Kelvin, Partick, Summerston, Woodlands, and Wyndford. Further to reviews of local government ward boundaries which came into effect in 2007 and 2017, but did not affect the parliamentary boundaries, the constituency comprised the City of Glasgow Council wards or part wards of: Hillhead (nearly all), Maryhill, Canal (minority) and Partick East/Kelvindale (most).

Glasgow North is one of six constituencies covering the Glasgow City council area. All are entirely within the council area.

Prior to the 2005 general election, the city area was covered by ten constituencies, of which two straddled boundaries with other council areas. The North constituency includes most of the former Glasgow Maryhill constituency, central sections of the former Glasgow Kelvin constituency and a Kelvindale area from the former Glasgow Anniesland constituency. Scottish Parliament constituencies retain the names and boundaries of the older Westminster constituencies.

The Glasgow North constituency has the University of Glasgow within its boundaries, and stretches out through Kelvindale to the large Summerston housing development. The largest element of the seat, in terms of former constituency boundaries, came from the Maryhill constituency, which was a mainly working class seat. The Glasgow North seat also included the more middle class areas of Hillhead, Hyndland and Kelvindale.

=== 2024–present ===
Further to the 2023 review of Westminster constituencies, which came into effect for the 2024 general election, Glasgow North had significant boundary changes. It comprises:

- 73.5% (by population) of Glasgow North (old boundaries)
- 24.5% of Glasgow Central (abolished) - City centre, Anderston and Kelvingrove districts
- 23.2% of Glasgow North East (old boundaries) - western areas including Milton, Cowlairs and Port Dundas
- 1.0% of Glasgow North West (abolished)

Glasgow North lost

- 26.5% of the old seat to Glasgow West - Partick and Hyndland districts

This means the revised constituency contains the following Glasgow City Council wards or part wards:

- The majority of Anderston/City/Yorkhill ward - excluding the Merchant City and Townhead districts;
- the whole of Hillhead ward;
- the whole of Maryhill ward;
- virtually all of Canal ward; and
- the minority of Partick East/Kelvindale ward, comprising most of the area to the north of the A82 Great Western Road (Kelvindale and Kelvinside districts).

== Members of Parliament ==
Election	Member	Party	Notes
2005	Ann McKechin	Labour	MP for Glasgow Maryhill until 2005
2015	Patrick Grady	SNP	
2022	Patrick Grady	Independent	
2023	Patrick Grady	SNP	
2024	Martin Rhodes	Labour	

== Election results ==
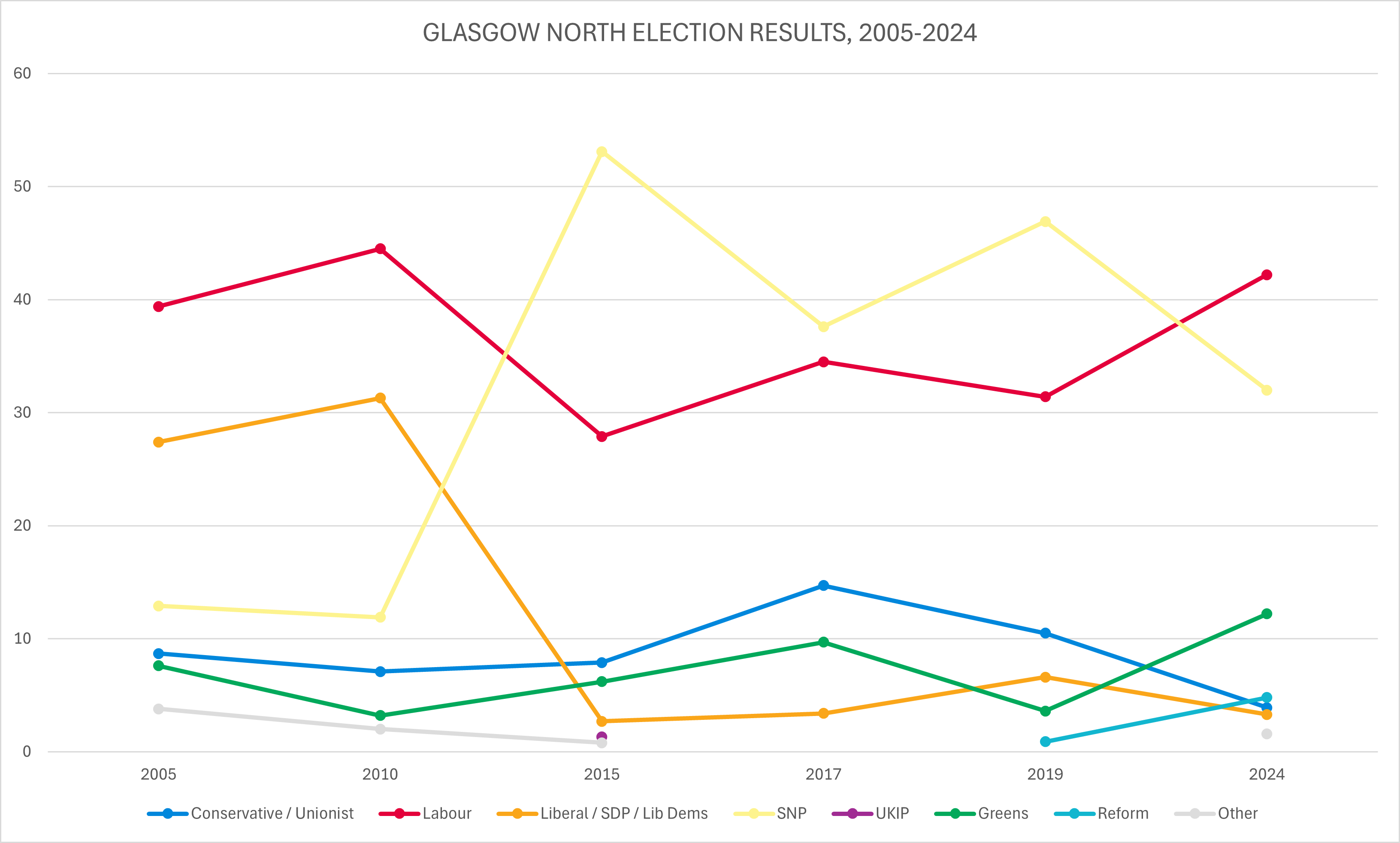
Election results 2005-2024

=== Elections in the 2020s ===
General election 2024: Glasgow North
Party	Candidate	Votes	%	±%
Labour	Martin Rhodes	14,655	42.2	+8.1
SNP	Alison Thewliss	11,116	32.0	−15.6
Green	Iris Duane	4,233	12.2	+8.5
Reform	Helen Burns	1,655	4.8	+4.2
Conservative	Naveed Asghar	1,366	3.9	−4.9
Liberal Democrats	Daniel O'Malley	1,142	3.3	−1.9
Alba	Nick Durie	572	1.6	N/A
Majority		3,539	10.2	N/A
Turnout		34,739	51.4	−5.3
Registered electors		67,579		
Labour gain from SNP		Swing	+11.8	

=== Elections in the 2010s ===
2019 notional result (Note: Estimate of the 2019 general election result as if the revised boundaries recommended under the 2023 boundary review were in place)
Party	Vote	%
Scottish National Party	19,754	47.6
Labour	14,172	34.1
Conservative	3,658	8.8
Liberal Democrats	2,156	5.2
Scottish Greens	1,553	3.7
Brexit Party	246	0.6
Majority	5,582	13.4
Turnout	41,539	56.7
Electorate	73,210	

General election 2019: Glasgow North
Party	Candidate	Votes	%	±%
SNP	Patrick Grady	16,982	46.9	+9.3
Labour	Pam Duncan-Glancy	11,381	31.4	−3.1
Conservative	Tony Curtis	3,806	10.5	−4.2
Liberal Democrats	Andrew Chamberlain	2,394	6.6	+3.2
Green	Cass MacGregor	1,308	3.6	−6.1
Brexit Party	Dionne Cocozza	320	0.9	New
Majority		5,601	15.5	+12.4
Turnout		36,191	63.3	+1.2
SNP hold		Swing	+6.2	

General election 2017: Glasgow North
Party	Candidate	Votes	%	±%
SNP	Patrick Grady	12,597	37.6	−15.5
Labour	Pam Duncan-Glancy	11,537	34.5	+6.6
Conservative	Stuart Cullen	4,935	14.7	+6.8
Green	Patrick Harvie	3,251	9.7	+3.5
Liberal Democrats	Andrew Chamberlain	1,153	3.4	+0.7
Majority		1,060	3.1	−22.1
Turnout		33,473	62.1	+0.7
SNP hold		Swing	-11.0	

General election 2015: Glasgow North
Party	Candidate	Votes	%	±%
SNP	Patrick Grady	19,610	53.1	+41.2
Labour	Ann McKechin	10,315	27.9	−16.6
Conservative	Lauren Hankinson	2,901	7.9	+0.8
Green	Martin Bartos	2,284	6.2	+3.0
Liberal Democrats	Jade O'Neil	1,012	2.7	−28.6
UKIP	Jamie Robertson	486	1.3	New
TUSC	Angela McCormick	160	0.4	−0.6
CISTA	Russell Benson	154	0.4	New
Majority		9,295	25.2	N/A
Turnout		36,922	61.4	+3.8
SNP gain from Labour		Swing	+28.9	

General election 2010: Glasgow North
Party	Candidate	Votes	%	±%
Labour	Ann McKechin	13,181	44.5	+5.1
Liberal Democrats	Katy Gordon	9,283	31.3	+3.9
SNP	Patrick Grady	3,530	11.9	−1.0
Conservative	Erin Boyle	2,089	7.1	−1.6
Green	Martin Bartos	947	3.2	−4.4
BNP	Thomas Main	296	1.0	New
TUSC	Angela McCormick	287	1.0	New
Majority		3,898	13.2	+1.2
Turnout		29,613	57.6	+7.2
Labour hold		Swing	+0.6	

=== Elections in the 2000s ===
General election 2005: Glasgow North
Party	Candidate	Votes	%	±%
Labour	Ann McKechin	11,001	39.4	−9.0
Liberal Democrats	Amy Rodger	7,663	27.4	+8.4
SNP	Kenneth McLean	3,614	12.9	−3.5
Conservative	Brian Pope	2,441	8.7	+0.5
Green	Martin Bartos	2,135	7.6	
Scottish Socialist	Nick Tarlton	1,067	3.8	−2.6
Majority		3,338	12.0	−18.4
Turnout		27,921	50.4	
Labour win (new seat)				

== See also ==
- Politics of Glasgow
