= Glasgow Kelvin (UK Parliament constituency) =

UK Parliament constituency (1997–2005)

- Former burgh constituency for the House of Commons
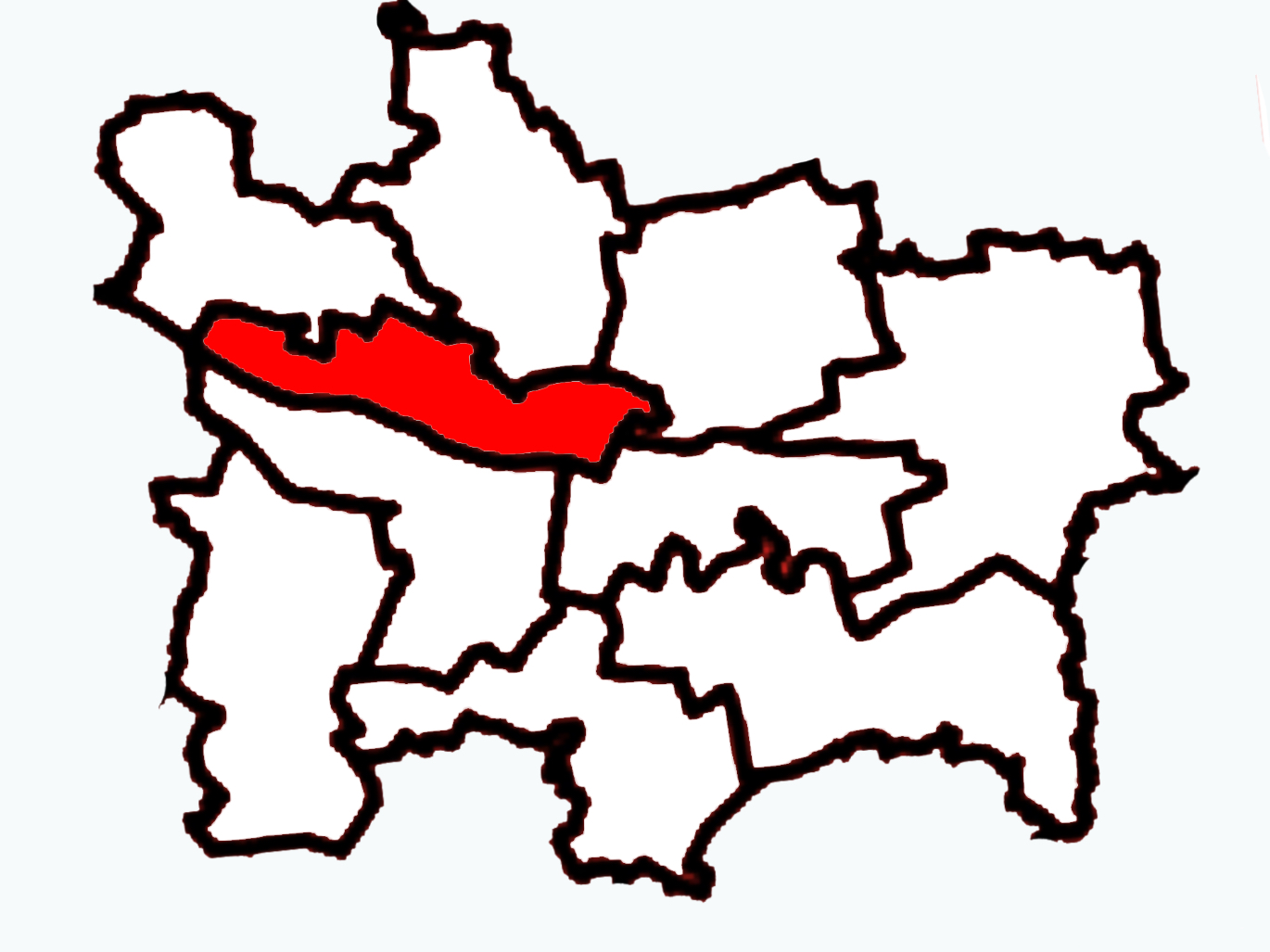
- Boundary of Glasgow Kelvin in Map showing Glasgow Kelvin in red
- Subdivision: Glasgow City council area

1997–2005
- Seats: One
- Created from: Glasgow Central; Glasgow Hillhead
- Replaced by: Glasgow Central; Glasgow North; Glasgow North West

Glasgow Kelvin was a parliamentary constituency represented in the House of Commons of the Parliament of the United Kingdom from 1997 until 2005. The area it represented is now covered by Glasgow Central, Glasgow North and Glasgow North West.

It elected one Member of Parliament (MP) using the first-past-the-post voting system.

== Boundaries ==
The City of Glasgow District electoral divisions of Anderston/City, Hyndland/Hillhead, and Scotstoun/Broomhill.

The constituency included Glasgow city centre.

== Members of Parliament ==
Year	Member	Party
1997	George Galloway	Labour
2003	George Galloway	Independent
2004	George Galloway	Respect
2005	constituency abolished	

== Election results ==
=== Elections of the 2000s ===
General election 2001: Glasgow Kelvin
Party	Candidate	Votes	%	±%
Labour	George Galloway	12,014	44.8	−6.2
Liberal Democrats	Tamsin Mayberry	4,754	17.7	+3.5
SNP	Frances Rankin	4,513	16.8	−4.6
Conservative	Davena Rankin	2,388	8.9	−1.9
Scottish Socialist	Heather Ritchie	1,847	6.9	+5.7
Green	Tim Shand	1,286	4.8	New
Majority		7,260	27.1	−2.5
Turnout		26,802	43.6	−12.5
Labour hold		Swing	−4.9	

=== Elections of the 1990s ===
General election 1997: Glasgow Kelvin
Party	Candidate	Votes	%	±%
Labour	George Galloway	16,643	51.0	
SNP	Sandra White	6,978	21.4	
Liberal Democrats	Elspeth M. Buchanan	4,629	14.2	
Conservative	Duncan H. McPhie	3,539	10.8	
Scottish Socialist	Allan Green	386	1.2	
Referendum	Robert J.M. Grigor	282	0.9	
Socialist (GB)	Victor Vanni	102	0.3	
Natural Law	George W. Stidolph	95	0.3	
Majority		9,665	29.6	
Turnout		32,654	56.1	
Labour win (new seat)				
