= List of MPs who lost their seat in the 2024 United Kingdom general election =

This is a list of MPs who lost their seat at the 2024 general election, together with the last date when each seat was represented by a different party. A record number of Conservative MPs lost their seats at the election. Three Cabinet members stood down; eight full members and four who attended Cabinet lost their seats, the highest number of sitting cabinet seat losses in history.

Constituency	Incumbent			Held since		Defeated by	
Constituency	Party	Member	Offices held	Member	Party	Member	Party
Hitchin (Note: Originally elected for Hitchin and Harpenden.)	Conservative	Bim Afolami	Economic Secretary to the Treasury	2017	1997	Alistair Strathern	Labour
Lowestoft (Note: Originally elected for Waveney.)	Conservative	Peter Aldous		2010	2010	Jessica Asato	Labour
Eastbourne	Conservative	Caroline Ansell		2019	2019	Josh Babarinde	Liberal Democrats
Wrexham	Conservative	Sarah Atherton	Parliamentary Under-Secretary of State for Defence People, Veterans and Service Families (2022)	2019	2019	Andrew Ranger	Labour
Tipton and Wednesbury (Note: Originally elected for West Bromwich West.)	Conservative	Shaun Bailey		2019	2019	Antonia Bance	Labour
Stroud	Conservative	Siobhan Baillie		2019	2019	Simon Opher	Labour
North Norfolk	Conservative	Duncan Baker		2019	2019	Steffan Aquarone	Liberal Democrats
Wycombe	Conservative	Steve Baker	Minister of State at the Cabinet Office	2010	1951	Emma Reynolds	Labour
North Shropshire (Note: Originally elected for Clwyd South.)	Conservative	Simon Baynes	Parliamentary Under-Secretary of State for Justice and Tackling Illegal Migration (2022)	2019	2019	Helen Morgan	Liberal Democrats
Rossendale and Darwen	Conservative	Jake Berry	Chairman of the Conservative Party (2022)	2010	2010	Andy MacNae	Labour
Worthing West	Conservative	Peter Bottomley	Father of the House	1975	1997	Beccy Cooper	Labour
Mansfield	Conservative	Ben Bradley		2017	2017	Steve Yemm	Labour
Stoke-on-Trent South	Conservative	Jack Brereton		2017	2017	Allison Gardner	Labour
Peterborough	Conservative	Paul Bristow		2019	2019	Andrew Pakes	Labour
Hyndburn	Conservative	Sara Britcliffe	Deputy Chairman of the Conservative Party	2019	2019	Sarah Smith	Labour
St Neots and Mid Cambridgeshire (Note: Originally elected for South Cambridgeshire.)	Conservative	Anthony Browne	Parliamentary Under-Secretary of State for Decarbonisation and Technology	2019	1997	Ian Sollom	Liberal Democrats
Congleton	Conservative	Fiona Bruce	Prime Minister's Special Envoy for Freedom of Religion or Belief	2010	1983	Sarah Russell	Labour
Kensington and Bayswater (Note: Originally elected for Kensington.)	Conservative	Felicity Buchan	Parliamentary Under-Secretary of State for Housing and Homelessness	2019	2019	Joe Powell	Labour
Swindon South	Conservative	Robert Buckland	Chair of the Northern Ireland Affairs Select Committee; Secretary of State for Wales (2022); Secretary of State for Justice (2019–22)	2010	2010	Heidi Alexander	Labour
Bournemouth West	Conservative	Conor Burns	Minister of State for Trade Policy (2022)	2010	1950	Jessica Toale	Labour
Aylesbury	Conservative	Rob Butler	Parliamentary Under-Secretary of State for Prisons and Probation (2022)	2019	1924	Laura Kyrke-Smith	Labour
Vale of Glamorgan	Conservative	Alun Cairns	Secretary of State for Wales (2016–2019)	2010	2010	Kanishka Narayan	Labour
Warrington South	Conservative	Andy Carter		2019	2019	Sarah Hall	Labour
Penistone and Stocksbridge	Conservative	Miriam Cates		2019	2019	Marie Tidball	Labour
Lewes	Conservative	Maria Caulfield	Parliamentary Under-Secretary of State for Mental Health and Women's Health Strategy	2015	2015	James MacCleary	Liberal Democrats
Cheltenham	Conservative	Alex Chalk	Secretary of State for Justice	2015	2015	Max Wilkinson	Liberal Democrats
Gillingham and Rainham	Conservative	Rehman Chishti	Parliamentary Under-Secretary of State for North America, Sanctions and Consular Policy (2022)	2010	2010	Naushabah Khan	Labour
Middlesbrough South and East Cleveland	Conservative	Simon Clarke	Secretary of State for Levelling Up, Housing and Communities (2022)	2017	2017	Luke Myer	Labour
Stafford	Conservative	Theo Clarke		2019	2010	Leigh Ingham	Labour
Bassetlaw	Conservative	Brendan Clarke-Smith	Deputy Chairman of the Conservative Party (2023–2024)	2019	2019	Jo White	Labour
Stratford-on-Avon (Note: Originally elected for Heywood and Middleton.)	Conservative	Chris Clarkson		2019	2019	Manuela Perteghella	Liberal Democrats
Suffolk Coastal	Conservative	Thérèse Coffey	Deputy Prime Minister (2022)	2010	1983	Jenny Riddell-Carpenter	Labour
Carshalton and Wallington	Conservative	Elliot Colburn		2019	2019	Bobby Dean	Liberal Democrats
Folkestone and Hythe	Conservative	Damian Collins	Parliamentary Under-Secretary of State for Tech and the Digital Economy (2022)	2010	1950	Tony Vaughan	Labour
Witney	Conservative	Robert Courts	Solicitor General for England and Wales	2016	1983	Charlie Maynard	Liberal Democrats
Mid and South Pembrokeshire (Note: Originally elected for Preseli Pembrokeshire.)	Conservative	Stephen Crabb	Chair of the Welsh Affairs Select Committee	2005	2005	Henry Tufnell	Labour
Ynys Môn	Conservative	Virginia Crosbie		2019	2019	Llinos Medi	Plaid Cymru
Bury North	Conservative	James Daly	Deputy Chairman of the Conservative Party	2019	2019	James Frith	Labour
Monmouthshire (Note: Originally elected for Monmouth.)	Conservative	David TC Davies	Secretary of State for Wales	2005	2005	Catherine Fookes	Labour
Clwyd East (Note: Originally elected for Vale of Clwyd.)	Conservative	James Davies	Parliamentary Under-Secretary of State for Wales (2022–2023)	2019	2019	Becky Gittins	Labour
Shipley	Conservative	Philip Davies		2005	2005	Anna Dixon	Labour
Derbyshire Dales	Conservative	Sarah Dines	Parliamentary Under-Secretary of State for Safeguarding (2022–2023)	2019	2010	John Whitby	Labour
Aldershot	Conservative	Leo Docherty	Minister of State for the Armed Forces	2017	1918	Alex Baker	Labour
Melksham and Devizes (Note: Originally elected for Chippenham.)	Conservative	Michelle Donelan	Secretary of State for Science, Innovation and Technology	2015	2015	Brian Mathew	Liberal Democrats
St Austell and Newquay	Conservative	Steve Double	Lords Commissioners of the Treasury (2022–2023)	2015	2015	Noah Law	Labour
Thurrock	Conservative	Jackie Doyle-Price	Chair of the Public Administration and Constitutional Affairs Select Committee	2010	2010	Jen Craft	Labour
South Dorset	Conservative	Richard Drax		2010	2010	Lloyd Hatton	Labour
Winchester (Note: Originally elected for Meon Valley.)	Conservative	Flick Drummond		2019	2010	Danny Chambers	Liberal Democrats
Ossett and Denby Dale (Note: Originally elected for Dewsbury.)	Conservative	Mark Eastwood		2019	2019	Jade Botterill	Labour
Rushcliffe	Conservative	Ruth Edwards	Assistant Government Whip	2019	1970	James Naish	Labour
Bournemouth East	Conservative	Tobias Ellwood	Chair of the Defence Select Committee (2020–2023)	2005	1974	Tom Hayes	Labour
Ribble Valley	Conservative	Nigel Evans	Chairman of Ways and Means	1992	1992	Maya Ellis	Labour
Milton Keynes North	Conservative	Ben Everitt		2019	2010	Chris Curtis	Labour
Lichfield	Conservative	Michael Fabricant	Lords Commissioners of the Treasury (2010–2012)	1992	1997	Dave Robertson	Labour
Newbury	Conservative	Laura Farris	Parliamentary Under-Secretary of State for Victims and Safeguarding	2019	2005	Lee Dillon	Liberal Democrats
Barrow and Furness	Conservative	Simon Fell		2019	2019	Michelle Scrogham	Labour
Southend West and Leigh (Note: Originally elected for Southend West.)	Conservative	Anna Firth		2022	1950	David Burton-Sampson	Labour
South Ribble	Conservative	Katherine Fletcher	Parliamentary Under-Secretary of State for Women (2022)	2019	2010	Paul Foster	Labour
Bolsover	Conservative	Mark Fletcher		2019	2019	Natalie Fleet	Labour
Doncaster East and the Isle of Axholme (Note: Originally elected for Don Valley.)	Conservative	Nick Fletcher		2019	2019	Lee Pitcher	Labour
Chelmsford	Conservative	Vicky Ford	Minister of State for Development (2022)	2017	2010	Marie Goldman	Liberal Democrats
Torbay	Conservative	Kevin Foster	Minister of State for Transport (2022)	2015	2015	Steve Darling	Liberal Democrats
North Somerset	Conservative	Liam Fox	Secretary of State for International Trade (2016–2019)	1992	2010	Sadik Al-Hassan	Labour
Ely and East Cambridgeshire (Note: Originally elected for South West Cambridgeshire.)	Conservative	Lucy Frazer	Secretary of State for Culture, Media and Sport	2015	1983	Charlotte Cane	Liberal Democrats
Yeovil	Conservative	Marcus Fysh	Parliamentary Under-Secretary of State for Exports (2022)	2015	2015	Adam Dance	Liberal Democrats
Darlington	Conservative	Peter Gibson		2019	2019	Lola McEvoy	Labour
Gloucester	Conservative	Richard Graham		2010	2010	Alex McIntyre	Labour
South Cotswolds (Note: Originally elected for North Wiltshire.)	Conservative	James Gray		1997	1983	Roz Savage	Liberal Democrats
Bolton West	Conservative	Chris Green		2015	2015	Phil Brickell	Labour
Ashford	Conservative	Damian Green	First Secretary of State (2017)	1997	1931	Sojan Joseph	Labour
Stoke-on-Trent North	Conservative	Jonathan Gullis	Deputy Chairman of the Conservative Party	2019	2019	David Williams	Labour
Thornbury and Yate	Conservative	Luke Hall	Minister of State for Skills, Apprenticeships and Higher Education	2015	2015	Claire Young	Liberal Democrats
Chelsea and Fulham	Conservative	Greg Hands	Minister of State for Trade Policy Minister for London	2005	2010	Ben Coleman	Labour
Forest of Dean	Conservative	Mark Harper	Secretary of State for Transport	2005	2005	Matt Bishop	Labour
Hastings and Rye	Conservative	Sally-Ann Hart		2019	2010	Helena Dollimore	Labour
Caerfyrddin (Note: Originally elected for Carmarthen West and South Pembrokeshire.)	Conservative	Simon Hart	Chief Whip of the Conservative Party	2010	2010	Ann Davies	Plaid Cymru
Broxtowe	Conservative	Darren Henry	Assistant Government Whip (2022)	2019	2010	Juliet Campbell	Labour
Burnley	Conservative	Antony Higginbotham		2019	2019	Oliver Ryan	Labour
Kettering	Conservative	Philip Hollobone		2005	2005	Rosie Wrighting	Labour
Gravesham	Conservative	Adam Holloway		2005	2005	Lauren Sullivan	Labour
Newton Aycliffe and Spennymoor (Note: Originally elected for Sedgefield.)	Conservative	Paul Howell		2019	2019	Alan Strickland	Labour
Tamworth (Note: Originally elected for Walsall North.)	Conservative	Eddie Hughes	Parliamentary Under-Secretary of State for Housing and Rough Sleeping (2021–2022)	2017	2017	Sarah Edwards	Labour
Loughborough	Conservative	Jane Hunt	Parliamentary Under-Secretary of State for Enterprise, Markets and Small Business (2022)	2019	2010	Jeevun Sandher	Labour
Ipswich	Conservative	Tom Hunt		2019	2019	Jack Abbott	Labour
North East Hampshire	Conservative	Ranil Jayawardena	Secretary of State for Environment, Food and Rural Affairs (2022)	2015	1997	Alex Brewer	Liberal Democrats
Penrith and Solway (Note: Originally elected for Workington.)	Conservative	Mark Jenkinson	Assistant Government Whip	2019	2019	Markus Campbell-Savours	Labour
Leeds South West and Morley (Note: Originally elected for Morley and Outwood.)	Conservative	Andrea Jenkyns	Parliamentary Under-Secretary of State for Skills, Further and Higher Education (2022)	2015	2015	Mark Sewards	Labour
Dartford	Conservative	Gareth Johnson	Parliamentary Under-Secretary of State for Courts (2022)	2010	2010	Jim Dickson	Labour
Didcot and Wantage (Note: Originally elected for Wantage.)	Conservative	David Johnston	Parliamentary Under-Secretary of State for Children, Families and Wellbeing	2019	1983	Olly Glover	Liberal Democrats
Harrogate and Knaresborough	Conservative	Andrew Jones	Parliamentary Under-Secretary of State for Transport (2018–2019)	2010	2010	Tom Gordon	Liberal Democrats
Brecon, Radnor and Cwm Tawe (Note: Originally elected for Brecon and Radnorshire.)	Conservative	Fay Jones	Parliamentary Under-Secretary of State for Wales	2019	2019	David Chadwick	Liberal Democrats
Nuneaton	Conservative	Marcus Jones	Government Deputy Chief Whip	2010	2010	Jodie Gosling	Labour
Honiton and Sidmouth (Note: Originally elected for East Devon.)	Conservative	Simon Jupp		2019	1997	Richard Foord	Liberal Democrats
Shrewsbury (Note: Originally elected for Shrewsbury and Atcham.)	Conservative	Daniel Kawczynski		2005	2005	Julia Buckley	Labour
Chichester	Conservative	Gillian Keegan	Secretary of State for Education	2017	1924	Jess Brown-Fuller	Liberal Democrats
Burton and Uttoxeter	Conservative	Kate Kniveton		2019	2010	Jacob Collier	Labour
High Peak	Conservative	Robert Largan	Assistant Government Whip	2019	2019	Jon Pearce	Labour
Cramlington and Killingworth (Note: Originally elected for Blyth Valley.)	Conservative	Ian Levy		2019	2019	Emma Foody	Labour
Northampton South	Conservative	Andrew Lewer		2017	2005	Mike Reader	Labour
Tiverton and Minehead (Note: Originally elected for Bridgwater and West Somerset.)	Conservative	Ian Liddell-Grainger		2001	1950	Rachel Gilmour	Liberal Democrats
West Dorset	Conservative	Chris Loder		2019	1885	Edward Morello	Liberal Democrats
Dudley (Note: Originally elected for Dudley North.)	Conservative	Marco Longhi		2019	2019	Sonia Kumar	Labour
Filton and Bradley Stoke	Conservative	Jack Lopresti		2010	2010	Claire Hazelgrove	Labour
Woking	Conservative	Jonathan Lord		2010	1950	Will Forster	Liberal Democrats
Truro and Falmouth	Conservative	Cherilyn Mackrory		2019	2010	Jayne Kirkham	Labour
Redditch	Conservative	Rachel Maclean	Deputy Chairman of the Conservative Party	2017	2010	Chris Bloore	Labour
South Devon (Note: Originally elected for Totnes.)	Conservative	Anthony Mangnall		2019	1997	Caroline Voaden	Liberal Democrats
North Cornwall	Conservative	Scott Mann	Lords Commissioners of the Treasury	2015	2015	Ben Maguire	Liberal Democrats
Hertford and Stortford	Conservative	Julie Marson	Assistant Government Whip (2022–2023)	2019	1983	Josh Dean	Labour
Blackpool North and Fleetwood (Note: Originally elected for Blackpool North and Cleveleys.)	Conservative	Paul Maynard	Parliamentary Under-Secretary of State for Pensions	2010	2010	Lorraine Beavers	Labour
Colne Valley	Conservative	Jason McCartney		2019	2019	Paul Davies	Labour
Lincoln	Conservative	Karl McCartney	Parliamentary Under-Secretary of State for Transport (2022)	2019	2019	Hamish Falconer	Labour
Plymouth Moor View	Conservative	Johnny Mercer	Minister of State for Veterans' Affairs	2015	2015	Fred Thomas	Labour
South Basildon and East Thurrock	Conservative	Stephen Metcalfe		2010	2010	James McMurdock	Reform
Bangor Aberconwy (Note: Originally elected for Aberconwy.)	Conservative	Robin Millar		2019	2010	Claire Hughes	Labour
Basingstoke	Conservative	Maria Miller	Chair of the Women and Equalities Committee (2015–2020)	2005	1924	Luke Murphy	Labour
Cannock Chase	Conservative	Amanda Milling	Lords Commissioners of the Treasury	2015	2010	Josh Newbury	Labour
Amber Valley	Conservative	Nigel Mills		2010	2010	Linsey Farnsworth	Labour
Southport	Conservative	Damien Moore	Assistant Government Whip (2022)	2017	2017	Patrick Hurley	Labour
Portsmouth North	Conservative	Penny Mordaunt	Leader of the House of Commons	2010	2010	Amanda Martin	Labour
Newton Abbot	Conservative	Anne Marie Morris		2010	2010	Martin Wrigley	Liberal Democrats
Morecambe and Lunesdale	Conservative	David Morris		2010	2010	Lizzi Collinge	Labour
Halesowen (Note: Originally elected for Halesowen and Rowley Regis.)	Conservative	James Morris	Parliamentary Under-Secretary of State for Vaccines and Public Health (2022)	2010	2010	Alex Ballinger	Labour
Hartlepool	Conservative	Jill Mortimer		2021	2021	Jonathan Brash	Labour
Scunthorpe	Conservative	Holly Mumby-Croft		2019	2019	Nic Dakin	Labour
South East Cornwall	Conservative	Sheryll Murray		2010	2010	Anna Gelderd	Labour
Great Grimsby and Cleethorpes (Note: Originally elected for Great Grimsby.)	Conservative	Lia Nici	Assistant Government Whip (2022)	2019	2019	Melanie Onn	Labour
Hexham	Conservative	Guy Opperman	Parliamentary Under-Secretary of State for Roads and Local Transport	2010	1924	Joe Morris	Labour
Weston-super-Mare	Conservative	John Penrose	United Kingdom Anti-Corruption Champion (2017–2022)	2005	2005	Dan Aldridge	Labour
Taunton and Wellington (Note: Originally elected for Taunton Deane.)	Conservative	Rebecca Pow	Parliamentary Under-Secretary of State for Nature	2015	2015	Gideon Amos	Liberal Democrats
Banbury	Conservative	Victoria Prentis	Attorney General for England and Wales; Advocate General for Northern Ireland	2015	1922	Sean Woodcock	Labour
Corby and East Northamptonshire (Note: Originally elected for Corby.)	Conservative	Tom Pursglove	Minister of State for Legal Migration and the Border	2015	2015	Lee Barron	Labour
Horsham	Conservative	Jeremy Quin	Chair of the Defence Select Committee	2015	1983	John Milne	Liberal Democrats
Gedling	Conservative	Tom Randall		2019	2019	Michael Payne	Labour
North East Somerset and Hanham (Note: Originally elected for North East Somerset.)	Conservative	Jacob Rees-Mogg	Secretary of State for Business, Energy and Industrial Strategy (2022)	2010	2010	Dan Norris	Labour
Guildford	Conservative	Angela Richardson	Deputy Chairman of the Conservative Party	2019	2005	Zöe Franklin	Liberal Democrats
Tewkesbury	Conservative	Laurence Robertson	Chair of the Northern Ireland Affairs Select Committee (2010–2017)	1997	1997	Cameron Thomas	Liberal Democrats
Cheadle	Conservative	Mary Robinson		2015	2015	Tom Morrison	Liberal Democrats
Aberdeenshire North and Moray East (Note: Originally elected for Moray.)	Conservative	Douglas Ross	Leader of the Scottish Conservative and Unionist Party	2017	2017	Seamus Logan	SNP
North East Derbyshire	Conservative	Lee Rowley	Minister of State for Housing, Planning and Building Safety	2017	2017	Louise Jones	Labour
Watford	Conservative	Dean Russell	Parliamentary Under-Secretary of State for Enterprise, Markets and Small Business (2022)	2019	2010	Matt Turmaine	Labour
Macclesfield	Conservative	David Rutley	Parliamentary Under-Secretary of State for Americas, Caribbean and Overseas Territories	2010	1918	Tim Roca	Labour
Birmingham Northfield	Conservative	Gary Sambrook	Executive Secretary of the 1922 Committee	2019	2019	Laurence Turner	Labour
North Devon	Conservative	Selaine Saxby		2019	2015	Ian Roome	Liberal Democrats
Isle of Wight West (Note: Originally elected for Isle of Wight.)	Conservative	Bob Seely		2017	2001	Richard Quigley	Labour
Dunstable and Leighton Buzzard (Note: Originally elected for South West Bedfordshire.)	Conservative	Andrew Selous	Second Church Estates Commissioner	2001	1983	Alex Mayer	Labour
Welwyn Hatfield	Conservative	Grant Shapps	Secretary of State for Defence	2005	2005	Andrew Lewin	Labour
Derby North	Conservative	Amanda Solloway	Parliamentary Under-Secretary of State for Affordability and Skills	2019	2019	Catherine Atkinson	Labour
Sherwood Forest (Note: Originally elected for Sherwood.)	Conservative	Mark Spencer	Minister of State for Food, Farming and Fisheries	2010	2010	Michelle Welsh	Labour
Rother Valley	Conservative	Alexander Stafford	Vice Chairman of the Conservative Party (2022–2023)	2019	2019	Jake Richards	Labour
Pendle and Clitheroe (Note: Originally elected for Pendle.)	Conservative	Andrew Stephenson	Minister of State for Health and Secondary Care	2010	2010	Jonathan Hinder	Labour
Wolverhampton North East	Conservative	Jane Stevenson		2019	2019	Sureena Brackenridge	Labour
Carlisle	Conservative	John Stevenson		2010	2010	Julie Minns	Labour
Buckingham and Bletchley (Note: Originally elected for Milton Keynes South.)	Conservative	Iain Stewart	Chair of the Transport Select Committee	2010	2010	Callum Anderson	Labour
York Outer	Conservative	Julian Sturdy		2010	2010	Luke Charters	Labour
Bracknell	Conservative	James Sunderland		2019	1997	Peter Swallow	Labour
Poole	Conservative	Robert Syms	Lords Commissioners of the Treasury (2016–2017)	1997	1950	Neil Duncan-Jordan	Labour
St Ives	Conservative	Derek Thomas		2015	2015	Andrew George	Liberal Democrats
Erewash	Conservative	Maggie Throup	Parliamentary Under-Secretary of State for Vaccines and Public Health (2021–2022)	2015	2010	Adam Thompson	Labour
Rochester and Strood	Conservative	Kelly Tolhurst	Minister of State for Schools and Childhood (2022)	2015	2015	Lauren Edwards	Labour
Swindon North	Conservative	Justin Tomlinson	Minister of State for Energy Security and Net Zero	2010	2010	Will Stone	Labour
Mid Dorset and North Poole	Conservative	Michael Tomlinson	Minister of State for Countering Illegal Migration	2015	2015	Vikki Slade	Liberal Democrats
North Warwickshire and Bedworth (Note: Originally elected for North Warwickshire.)	Conservative	Craig Tracey		2015	2010	Rachel Taylor	Labour
North Northumberland (Note: Originally elected for Berwick-upon-Tweed.)	Conservative	Anne-Marie Trevelyan	Minister of State for Indo-Pacific	2015	2015	David Smith	Labour
South West Norfolk	Conservative	Liz Truss	Prime Minister (2022)	2010	1964	Terry Jermy	Labour
Uxbridge and South Ruislip	Conservative	Steve Tuckwell		2023	2010	Danny Beales	Labour
North West Cambridgeshire	Conservative	Shailesh Vara	Secretary of State for Northern Ireland (2022)	2005	1983	Sam Carling	Labour
Chipping Barnet	Conservative	Theresa Villiers	Secretary of State for Environment, Food and Rural Affairs (2019–2020)	2005	1974	Dan Tomlinson	Labour
Boston and Skegness	Conservative	Matt Warman	Minister of State for Digital, Culture, Media and Sport (2022)	2015	1997	Richard Tice	Reform
Clacton	Conservative	Giles Watling		2017	2017	Nigel Farage	Reform
Stourbridge	Conservative	Suzanne Webb	Assistant Government Whip	2019	2010	Cat Eccles	Labour
South Derbyshire	Conservative	Heather Wheeler	Parliamentary Secretary for the Cabinet Office (2022)	2010	2010	Samantha Niblett	Labour
North Herefordshire	Conservative	Bill Wiggin		2001	2010	Ellie Chowns	Green
Montgomeryshire and Glyndŵr (Note: Originally elected for Montgomeryshire.)	Conservative	Craig Williams	Parliamentary Private Secretary to the Prime Minister	2019	2010	Steve Witherden	Labour
Redcar	Conservative	Jacob Young	Parliamentary Under-Secretary of State for Levelling Up	2019	2019	Anna Turley	Labour
Livingston	SNP	Hannah Bardell		2015	2015	Gregor Poynton	Labour
Coatbridge and Bellshill (Note: Originally elected for Coatbridge, Chryston and Bellshill.)	SNP	Steven Bonnar	SNP Spokesperson for Environment, Farming, Agriculture and Rural Affairs	2019	2019	Frank McNally	Labour
Edinburgh North and Leith	SNP	Deidre Brock	SNP Spokesperson for Business	2015	2015	Tracy Gilbert	Labour
Kilmarnock and Loudoun	SNP	Alan Brown	SNP Spokesperson for Energy Security and Net Zero (2022–2023)	2015	2015	Lillian Jones	Labour
Mid Dunbartonshire (Note: Originally elected for East Dunbartonshire.)	SNP	Amy Callaghan	SNP Spokesperson for Health	2019	2019	Susan Murray	Liberal Democrats
Edinburgh South West	SNP	Joanna Cherry		2015	2015	Scott Arthur	Labour
Inverclyde and Renfrewshire West (Note: Originally elected for Inverclyde.)	SNP	Ronnie Cowan		2015	2015	Martin McCluskey	Labour
Bathgate and Linlithgow (Note: Originally elected for Linlithgow and East Falkirk.)	SNP	Martyn Day	SNP Spokesperson for Health (2021–2023)	2015	2015	Kirsteen Sullivan	Labour
West Dunbartonshire	SNP	Martin Docherty-Hughes	SNP Spokesperson for Defence	2015	2015	Douglas McAllister	Labour
Ayr, Carrick and Cumnock	SNP	Allan Dorans		2019	2019	Elaine Stewart	Labour
Motherwell, Wishaw and Carluke (Note: Originally elected for Motherwell and Wishaw.)	SNP	Marion Fellows		2015	2015	Pamela Nash	Labour
North Ayrshire and Arran	SNP	Patricia Gibson	SNP Attorney General Spokesperson	2015	2015	Irene Campbell	Labour
Inverness, Skye and West Ross-shire (Note: Originally elected for Inverness, Nairn, Badenoch and Strathspey.)	SNP	Drew Hendry		2015	2015	Angus MacDonald	Liberal Democrats
Glasgow East	SNP	David Linden	SNP Spokesperson for Social Justice	2017	2015	John Grady	Labour
Glasgow South	SNP	Stewart McDonald		2015	2015	Gordon McKee	Labour
Cumbernauld and Kirkintilloch	SNP	Stuart McDonald	SNP Spokesperson for Justice and Immigration (2022–2023)	2015	2015	Katrina Murray	Labour
Glasgow North East	SNP	Anne McLaughlin	SNP Spokesperson for International Development	2019	2019	Maureen Burke	Labour
Glasgow West (Note: Originally elected for Glasgow North West.)	SNP	Carol Monaghan	SNP Spokesperson for Science, Innovation, Technology and Education	2015	2015	Patricia Ferguson	Labour
Paisley and Renfrewshire North	SNP	Gavin Newlands	SNP Spokesperson for Transport	2015	2015	Alison Taylor	Labour
Alloa and Grangemouth (Note: Originally elected for Ochil and South Perthshire.)	SNP	John Nicolson	SNP Spokesperson for Digital, Culture, Media and Sport	2019	2019	Brian Leishman	Labour
East Renfrewshire	SNP	Kirsten Oswald	SNP Spokesperson for Women and Equalities	2019	2019	Blair McDougall	Labour
Airdrie and Shotts	SNP	Anum Qaisar	SNP Spokesperson for Levelling Up	2021	2015	Kenneth Stevenson	Labour
Edinburgh East and Musselburgh (Note: Originally elected for Edinburgh East.)	SNP	Tommy Sheppard	SNP Scotland Spokesperson	2015	2015	Chris Murray	Labour
Stirling and Strathallan (Note: Originally elected for Stirling.)	SNP	Alyn Smith	SNP Spokesperson for Europe and EU Accession	2019	2019	Chris Kane	Labour
Glasgow South West	SNP	Chris Stephens	SNP Spokesperson for Justice and Immigration	2015	2015	Zubir Ahmed	Labour
Glasgow North (Note: Originally elected for Glasgow Central.)	SNP	Alison Thewliss	SNP Spokesperson for Home Affairs	2015	2015	Martin Rhodes	Labour
Midlothian	SNP	Owen Thompson	Chief Whip of the Scottish National Party in the House of Commons	2019	2019	Kirsty McNeill	Labour
Gordon and Buchan (Note: Originally elected for Gordon.)	SNP	Richard Thomson	SNP Spokesperson for Northern Ireland, Wales, Business and Trade	2019	2019	Harriet Cross	Conservative
North West Leicestershire	Independent	Andrew Bridgen (Note: Originally elected for the Conservative Party.)		2010	2010	Amanda Hack	Labour
Solihull West and Shirley (Note: Originally elected for Solihull.)	Independent	Julian Knight	Chair of the Culture, Media and Sport Committee (2020–2023)	2015	2015	Neil Shastri-Hurst	Conservative
Na h-Eileanan an Iar	Independent	Angus MacNeil (Note: Originally elected for the Scottish National Party.)		2005	2005	Torcuil Crichton	Labour
Clwyd East (Note: Originally elected for Delyn.)	Independent	Rob Roberts		2019	2019	Becky Gittins	Labour
Leicester East	Independent	Claudia Webbe (Note: Originally elected for the Labour Party.)		2019	1987	Shivani Raja	Conservative
Leicester South	Labour	Jonathan Ashworth	Shadow Paymaster General	2011	2005	Shockat Adam	Independent
Bristol Central (Note: Originally elected for Bristol West.)	Labour	Thangam Debbonaire	Shadow Secretary of State for Culture, Media and Sport	2015	2015	Carla Denyer	Green
Blackburn	Labour	Kate Hollern	Shadow Minister for Communities and Local Government (2016–2021)	2015	1955	Adnan Hussain	Independent
Birmingham Perry Barr	Labour	Khalid Mahmood	Shadow Minister for Defence Procurement (2020–2021)	2001	1974	Ayoub Khan	Independent
Cowdenbeath and Kirkcaldy	Alba	Neale Hanvey	Leader of the Alba Party in the House of Commons	2019	2019	Melanie Ward	Labour
Alloa and Grangemouth (Note: Originally elected for East Lothian.)	Alba	Kenny MacAskill		2019	2019	Brian Leishman	Labour
South Antrim	DUP	Paul Girvan		2017	2017	Robin Swann	UUP
North Antrim	DUP	Ian Paisley Jr		2010	1970	Jim Allister	TUV
North Down	Alliance	Stephen Farry		2019	2019	Alex Easton	Independent
Rochdale	Workers Party	George Galloway		2024	2024	Paul Waugh	Labour

== Changes of affiliation in open seats ==
Constituency	Existing			Defeated by	
Constituency	Party	New candidate	Retiring incumbent	Candidate	Party
Altrincham and Sale West	Conservative	Oliver Carroll	Graham Brady	Connor Rand	Labour
Beckenham and Penge (Note: Represented predecessor seat Beckenham.)	Conservative	Hannah Gray	Bob Stewart	Liam Conlon	Labour
Bexleyheath and Crayford	Conservative	Mark Brooks	David Evennett	Daniel Francis	Labour
Bishop Auckland	Conservative	Jane MacBean	Dehenna Davison	Sam Rushworth	Labour
Bolton North East	Conservative	Adele Warren	Mark Logan	Kirith Entwistle	Labour
Bridgend	Conservative	Anita Boateng	Jamie Wallis	Chris Elmore	Labour
Bury St Edmunds and Stowmarket (Note: Represented predecessor seat Bury St Edmunds.)	Conservative	Will Tanner	Jo Churchill	Peter Prinsley	Labour
Calder Valley	Conservative	Vanessa Lee	Craig Whittaker	Josh Fenton-Glynn	Labour
Camborne and Redruth	Conservative	Connor Donnithorne	George Eustice	Perran Moon	Labour
Central Ayrshire	SNP	Annie McIndoe	Philippa Whitford	Alan Gemmell	Labour
Chatham and Aylesford	Conservative	Nathan Gamester	Tracey Crouch	Tris Osborne	Labour
Chippenham	Conservative	Nic Puntis	Michelle Donelan	Sarah Gibson	Liberal Democrats
Cities of London and Westminster	Conservative	Tim Barnes	Nickie Aiken	Rachel Blake	Labour
Colchester	Conservative	James Cracknell	Will Quince	Pam Cox	Labour
Crawley	Conservative	Zack Ali	Henry Smith	Peter Lamb	Labour
Crewe and Nantwich	Conservative	Ben Fletcher	Kieran Mullan	Connor Naismith	Labour
Dover and Deal	Conservative	Stephen James	Natalie Elphicke	Mike Tapp	Labour
East Thanet (Note: Represented predecessor seat South Thanet.)	Conservative	Helen Harrison	Craig Mackinlay	Polly Billington	Labour
East Worthing and Shoreham	Conservative	Leila Williams	Tim Loughton	Tom Rutland	Labour
Eastleigh	Conservative	Samuel Joynson	Paul Holmes	Liz Jarvis	Liberal Democrats
Epsom and Ewell	Conservative	Mhairi Fraser	Chris Grayling	Helen Maguire	Liberal Democrats
Esher and Walton	Conservative	John Cope	Dominic Raab	Monica Harding	Liberal Democrats
Falkirk	SNP	Toni Giugliano	John McNally	Euan Stainbank	Labour
Finchley and Golders Green	Conservative	Alex Deane	Mike Freer	Sarah Sackman	Labour
Great Yarmouth	Conservative	James Clark	Brandon Lewis	Rupert Lowe	Reform
Harlow	Conservative	Hannah Ellis	Robert Halfon	Chris Vince	Labour
Hazel Grove	Conservative	Paul Athans	William Wragg	Lisa Smart	Liberal Democrats
Hemel Hempstead	Conservative	Andrew Williams	Mike Penning	David Taylor	Labour
Hendon	Conservative	Ameet Jogia	Matthew Offord	David Pinto-Duschinsky	Labour
Lagan Valley	DUP	Jonathan Buckley	Jeffrey Donaldson	Sorcha Eastwood	Alliance
Leigh and Atherton (Note: Represented predecessor seat Leigh.)	Conservative	Michael Winstanley	James Grundy	Jo Platt	Labour
Lothian East	Alba	George Kerevan	Kenny MacAskill	Douglas Alexander	Labour
Maidenhead	Conservative	Tania Mathias	Theresa May	Joshua Reynolds	Liberal Democrats
Mid Bedfordshire	Labour	Maahwish Mirza	Alistair Strathern (Note: Elected for new seat Hitchin)	Blake Stephenson	Conservative
Mid Derbyshire	Conservative	Luke Gardiner	Pauline Latham	Jonathan Davies	Labour
Mid Sussex	Conservative	Kristy Adams	Mims Davies	Alison Bennett	Liberal Democrats
Newcastle-under-Lyme	Conservative	Simon Tagg	Aaron Bell	Adam Jogee	Labour
North East Hertfordshire	Conservative	Nikki da Costa	Oliver Heald	Chris Hinchliff	Labour
Northampton North	Conservative	Dan Bennett	Michael Ellis	Lucy Rigby	Labour
Norwich North	Conservative	Charlotte Saloman	Chloe Smith	Alice Macdonald	Labour
Paisley and Renfrewshire South	SNP	Jacqueline Cameron	Mhairi Black	Johanna Baxter	Labour
Rugby	Conservative	Yousef Dahmash	Mark Pawsey	John Slinger	Labour
Scarborough and Whitby	Conservative	Roberto Weedan-Sanz	Robert Goodwill	Alison Hume	Labour
Sittingbourne and Sheppey	Conservative	Aisha Cuthbert	Gordon Henderson	Kevin McKenna	Labour
South Cambridgeshire	Conservative	Chris Carter-Chapman	Anthony Browne	Pippa Heylings	Liberal Democrats
South Norfolk	Conservative	Poppy Simister-Thomas	Richard Bacon	Ben Goldsborough	Labour
Southend East and Rochford	Conservative	Gavin Haran	James Duddridge	Bayo Alaba	Labour
Southampton Itchen	Conservative	Sidney Yankson	Royston Smith	Darren Paffey	Labour
Stevenage	Conservative	Alex Clarkson	Stephen McPartland	Kevin Bonavia	Labour
Stoke-on-Trent Central	Conservative	Chandra Kanneganti	Jo Gideon	Gareth Snell	Labour
Surrey Heath	Conservative	Ed McGuinness	Michael Gove	Al Pinkerton	Liberal Democrats
Sutton and Cheam	Conservative	Tom Drummond	Paul Scully	Luke Taylor	Liberal Democrats
Telford	Conservative	Hannah Campbell	Lucy Allan	Shaun Davies	Labour
Tunbridge Wells	Conservative	Neil Mahapatra	Greg Clark	Mike Martin	Liberal Democrats
Wimbledon	Conservative	Danielle Dunfield-Prayero	Stephen Hammond	Paul Kohler	Liberal Democrats
Wokingham	Conservative	Lucy Demery	John Redwood	Clive Jones	Liberal Democrats
Worcester	Conservative	Marc Bayliss	Robin Walker	Tom Collins	Labour
