= Shaun Bailey (MP) =

British politician

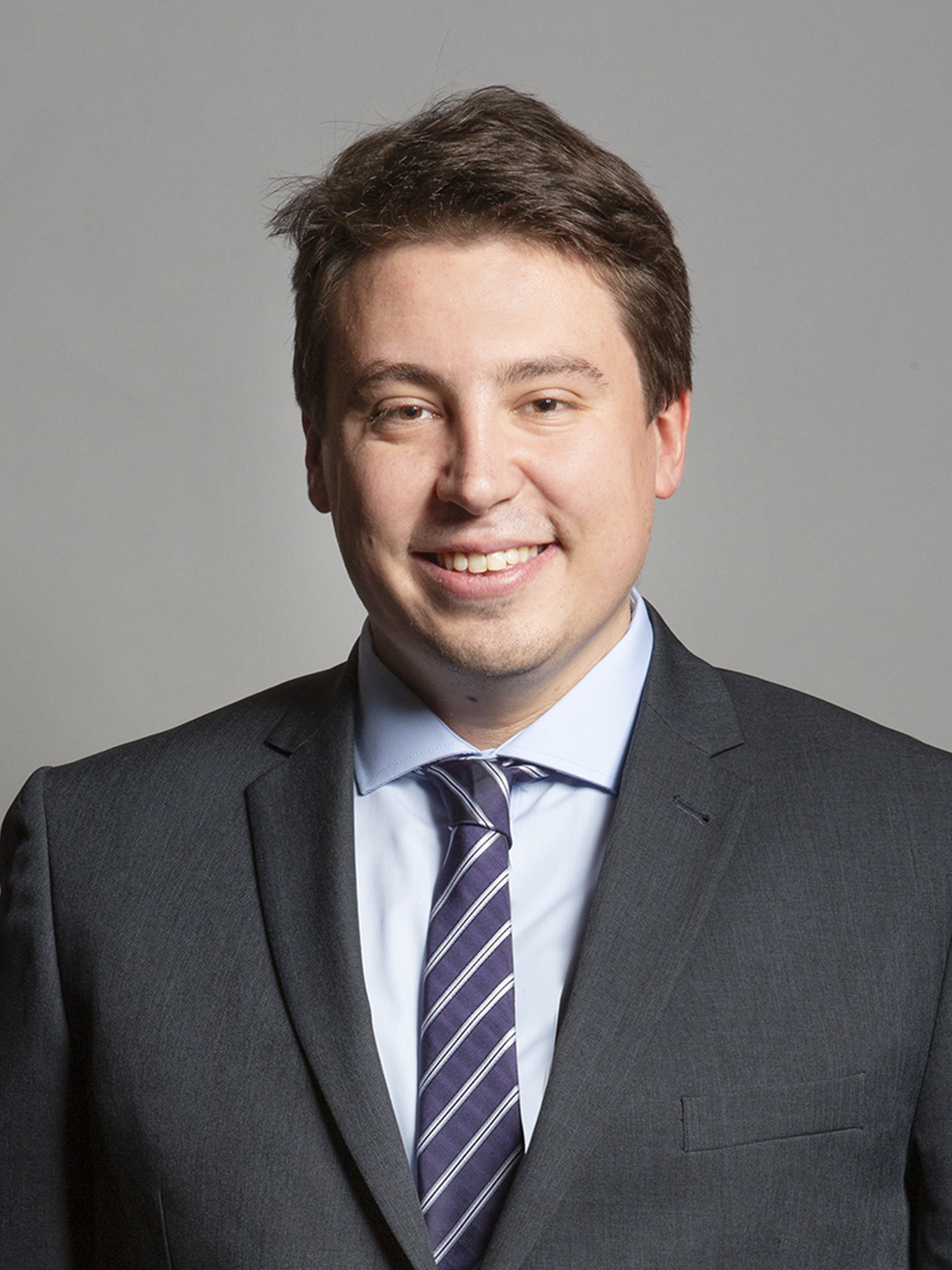
- Official portrait, 2019

Member of Parliament for West Bromwich West
- In office 12 December 2019 – 30 May 2024
- Preceded by: Adrian Bailey
- Succeeded by: Constituency abolished

Personal details
- Born: Shaun Stephen Bailey; 22 July 1992 (age 34) Stafford, England
- Party: Conservative
- Education: Aberystwyth University; University of the West of England
- Website: www.shaunbailey.org.uk

Shaun Stephen Bailey (born 22 July 1992) is a British Conservative Party politician who served as the member of Parliament (MP) for West Bromwich West from 2019 until 2024.

== Early life and career ==
Bailey grew up in Telford and Newport in Shropshire where he and his sister were raised by their mother. He attended Burton Borough School in Newport and studied for his A-Levels at Idsall School in Shifnal. He joined the Conservative Party when he was 15. Bailey studied Law and French at Aberystwyth University, graduating with an LLB and later obtained a master's degree in Legal Practice at the University of the West of England in Bristol. After graduating he worked as a paralegal before becoming a trainee solicitor for Barclays in 2019.

== Political career ==
In the 2012 Ceredigion County Council election, he was the Conservative candidate for Borth ward and finished in last place. Bailey contested as the Conservative candidate for the Hesters Way and Springbank ward of the Gloucestershire County Council in the 2017 election where he finished in second place. He was selected as the Conservative candidate for West Bromwich West on 9 November 2019. Bailey was elected as MP in the 2019 general election with a majority of 3,799 (11.0%). The seat had previously been held by Labour and Co-operative MP Adrian Bailey since the 2000 by-election and had been previously held by the former Speaker of the House of Commons Betty Boothroyd before that. Adrian Bailey had chosen to stand down in October 2019 prior to the general election.

Bailey made his maiden speech on 30 January 2020 where he paid tribute to his mother whom he called a "fighter" who inspired him to become a politician and his predecessors Bailey and Boothroyd. He has been a member of the Work and Pensions Select Committee since March 2020 and was a member of the Public Accounts Committee between November 2020 and October 2022. Bailey is a supporter of Blue Collar Conservatism. He was a Parliamentary private secretary in the Cabinet Office between July and September 2022.

From September 2022 to June 2024, Bailey was a Parliamentary Private Secretary to the Home Office.

After Liz Truss resigned as Prime Minister in October 2022, he supported former PM Boris Johnson's bid in the October 2022 Conservative Party leadership election who had resigned in July 2022. He had previously backed Truss in the July–September 2022 Conservative Party leadership election and had withdrawn his support for Johnson as PM in July after the July 2022 United Kingdom government crisis.

Following the abolition of the West Bromwich West constituency, Bailey stood as a candidate in Tipton and Wednesbury for the 2024 general election, but lost his seat to Labour's Antonia Bance.

== Post-parliamentary career ==
Following his defeat at the 2024 general election, Bailey started work as a Trainee Solicitor at Bendles Solicitors.

Parliament of the United Kingdom
Preceded by Adrian Bailey	Member of Parliament for West Bromwich West; 2019–2024	Constituency abolished
