= Glasgow Anniesland =

Glasgow Anniesland may refer to:

- Glasgow Anniesland (UK Parliament constituency)
- Glasgow Anniesland (Scottish Parliament constituency)
