= Carol Monaghan =

Scottish politician

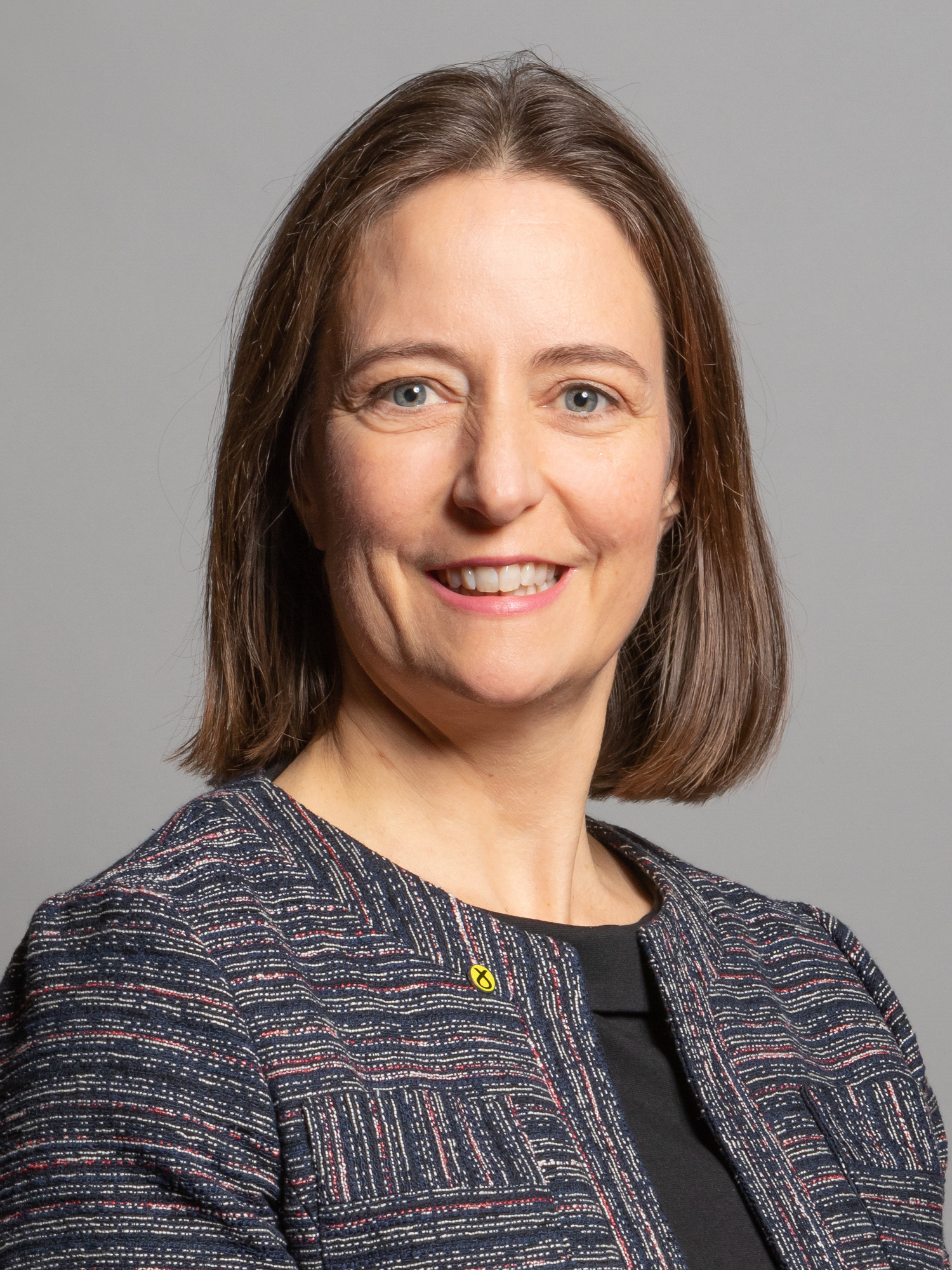
- Official portrait, 2020

SNP Spokesperson for Science, Innovation, Technology and Education in the House of Commons (Note: SNP Spokesperson for Education from 10 December 2022 to 4 September 2023)
- In office 10 December 2022 – 5 July 2024
- Leader: Stephen Flynn
- Preceded by: Herself (Education, Military Personnel and Veterans)
- Succeeded by: Office not in use

SNP Spokesperson for Education, Military Personnel and Veterans in the House of Commons
- In office 20 June 2017 – 10 December 2022
- Leader: Ian Blackford
- Preceded by: Office established
- Succeeded by: Herself (Education)

Member of Parliament for Glasgow North West
- In office 7 May 2015 – 30 May 2024
- Preceded by: John Robertson
- Succeeded by: Constituency abolished

Personal details
- Born: 2 August 1972 (age 54) Glasgow, Scotland
- Party: Scottish National Party
- Spouse: Feargal Dalton
- Children: 3
- Education: University of Strathclyde

Carol Monaghan (born 2 August 1972) is a Scottish National Party (SNP) politician who served as Member of Parliament (MP) for Glasgow North West from 2015 until the seat's abolition in 2024. She was the SNP Science, Innovation, Technology and Education spokesperson in the House of Commons.

== Early life, education and career ==
Monaghan studied at Strathclyde University, graduating with a BSc (Hons) in Laser Physics and Optoelectronics in 1993.

Monaghan had formerly been a physics teacher at Glasgow west end independent school The Glasgow Academy, and head of science at Hyndland Secondary School but left the post to concentrate on campaigning before the 2015 general election.

== Parliamentary career ==
Following the 2017 general election, Monaghan was appointed the SNP's Westminster Spokesperson for Education, Armed Forces and Veterans. Monaghan has campaigned for an armed forces representative body on a statutory footing.

Monaghan has campaigned on the issue of research, treatment and attitudes towards myalgic encephalomyelitis (ME), leading two Westminster Hall debates in 2018, and a full debate in the House of Commons in 2019.

In a debate with the UK Parliament House of Commons in March 2024, Monaghan recognized the expulsion of Armenians from Nagorno-Karabakh as ethnic cleansing, criticized British business leaders for capitalizing on the commercial opportunities in the region during such a “tragic situation”, noted the erasure and destruction of Armenian churches and crosses, expressed support for the UK recognition of the Armenian genocide, and strongly urged the House to provide more assistance to the Armenian refugees.

In the 2024 general election she stood in the new seat of Glasgow West and was unseated by Labour's Patricia Ferguson.

== Post-parliamentary career ==
Following her defeat at the 2024 UK General Election, Monaghan returned to work as a teacher.

== Personal life ==
Monaghan is married to Glasgow City councillor and physics teacher Feargal Dalton, and they have two daughters and a son from a previous partner. She is a practising Roman Catholic.

== Notes ==
Parliament of the United Kingdom
Preceded by John Robertson	Member of Parliament for Glasgow North West; 2015–2024	Constituency abolished
