= Adrian Bailey =

British politician (born 1945)

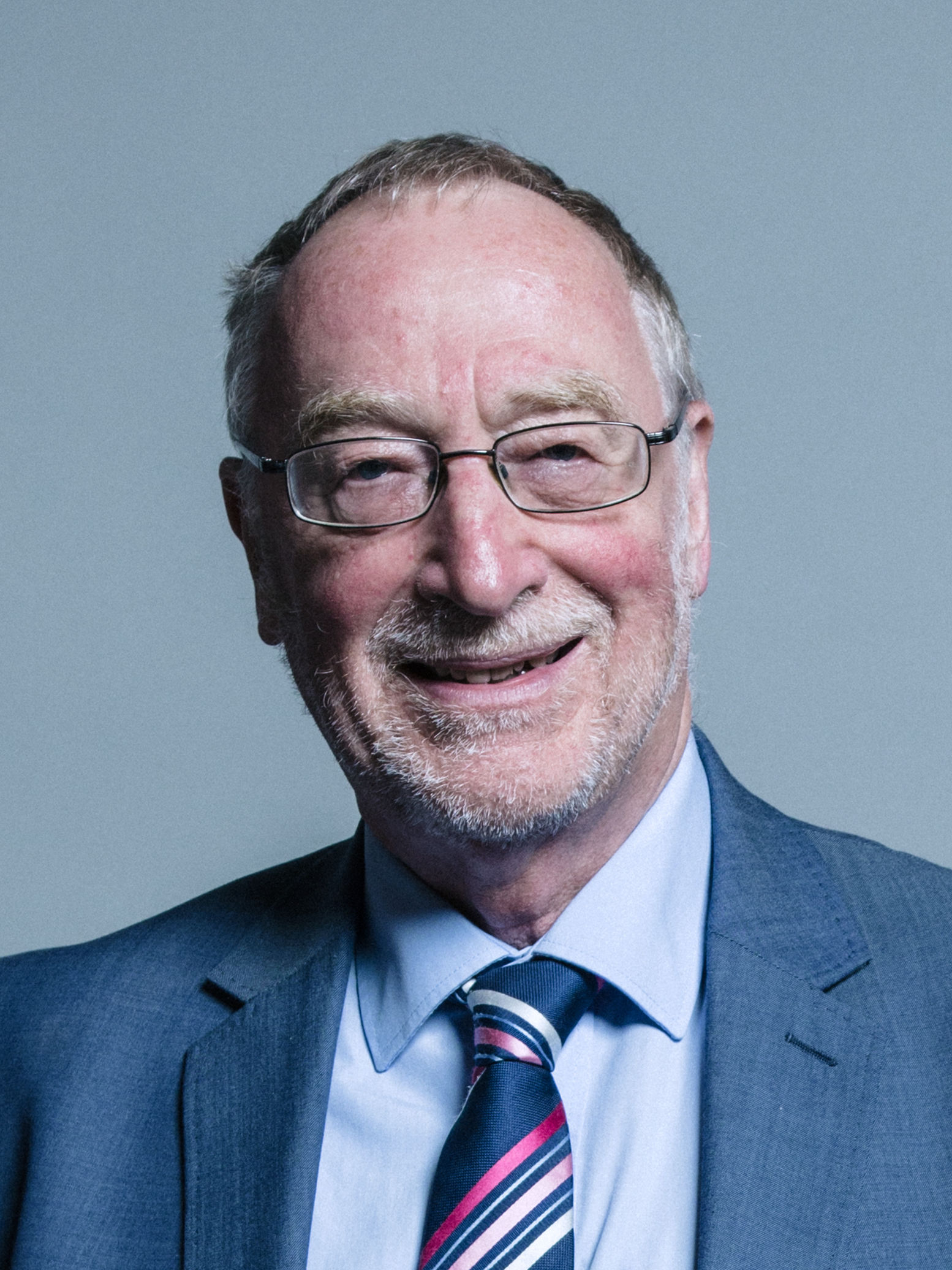
- Official portrait, 2017

Chairman of the Business, Innovation and Skills Select Committee
- In office 10 June 2010 – 30 March 2015
- Preceded by: Peter Luff
- Succeeded by: Iain Wright

Member of Parliament for West Bromwich West
- In office 23 November 2000 – 6 November 2019
- Preceded by: Betty Boothroyd
- Succeeded by: Shaun Bailey

Personal details
- Born: 11 December 1945 (age 80) Salisbury, Wiltshire, England
- Party: Labour Co-op
- Spouse: Jill Bailey
- Education: University of Exeter, Loughborough University
- Website: https://www.adrianbaileymp.com/ parliament..adrian-bailey

Adrian Edward Bailey (born 11 December 1945) is a retired British Labour and Co-operative politician. He was the Member of Parliament (MP) for West Bromwich West from 2000, when he won the seat at a by-election in November 2000 until he stood down at the general election in 2019. He was the Chairman of the Business, Innovation and Skills Committee 2010–2015.

== Early life ==
Born in Salisbury, Bailey was educated at Cheltenham Grammar School before going on to university at the University of Exeter, graduating in 1967 with an Honours Degree in Economic History. Subsequently, he trained at the Loughborough College of Librarianship and graduated in 1971 with a postgraduate diploma in Librarianship. From 1971 to 1982 he was employed as a professional librarian by Cheshire County Council and from 1973 to 1982 he also worked as a librarian and teacher of study skills in a Cheshire Comprehensive school.

== Political career ==
Bailey contested the seat of South Worcestershire at the 1970 general election, where he was easily defeated by Gerald Nabarro. At both the February 1974 general election and October 1974 general election he unsuccessfully contested the Cheshire seat of Nantwich, where he was defeated by John Cockcroft.

In 1976, the Speaker of the House of Commons, Selwyn Lloyd decided to stand down from the Commons, and Bailey contested the resulting by-election. However, he was again easily defeated, this time by David Hunt, who was later to enter the Cabinet of John Major. Bailey was not to fight a Parliamentary election again for 24 years, but contested and lost the Cheshire West European seat in 1979.

In 1982, Bailey moved to the West Midlands to become a full-time political organiser for the Co-operative Party covering the Midlands and South Yorkshire region. He held this post until his election to Parliament in 2000.

He was elected as a councillor for Sandwell Borough Council in 1991 and was its Deputy Leader from 1997 to 2000. At the time of the resignation of Commons Speaker, Betty Boothroyd in 2000, Bailey was the Secretary of the constituency Labour Party and Deputy Leader of the local council and seemed the obvious choice to fight what was then a safe Labour seat in the impending by-election. He was chosen to fight the seat and won fairly comfortably on 23 November 2000, entering the Commons 30 years after his first attempt. He is unusual in that he has contested two Parliamentary by-elections caused by the resignation of two different Speakers of the House of Commons.

Following its establishment in 2002, Bailey took the position of Secretary of The All Party Parliamentary Group for Steel which acts as a group to promote the interests of the steel manufacturing industry and the communities that work in that industry.

Following the 2005 general election, Bailey became a Parliamentary private secretary to the Secretary of State for Work and Pensions and served successive Secretaries of State, David Blunkett and John Hutton. He also served as the Parliamentary Private Secretary to Bob Ainsworth, the Minister of State at the Ministry of Defence.

He supported Owen Smith in the failed attempt to replace Jeremy Corbyn in the 2016 Labour leadership election.

He retired at the 2019 general election.

== Personal life ==
In 1989 Bailey married Jill, a schoolteacher.

Parliament of the United Kingdom
Preceded by Betty Boothroyd	Member of Parliament for West Bromwich West; 2000–2019	Succeeded by Shaun Bailey
