= 2000 West Bromwich West by-election =

UK parliamentary by-election

- 23 November 2000
- Turnout: 27.3%
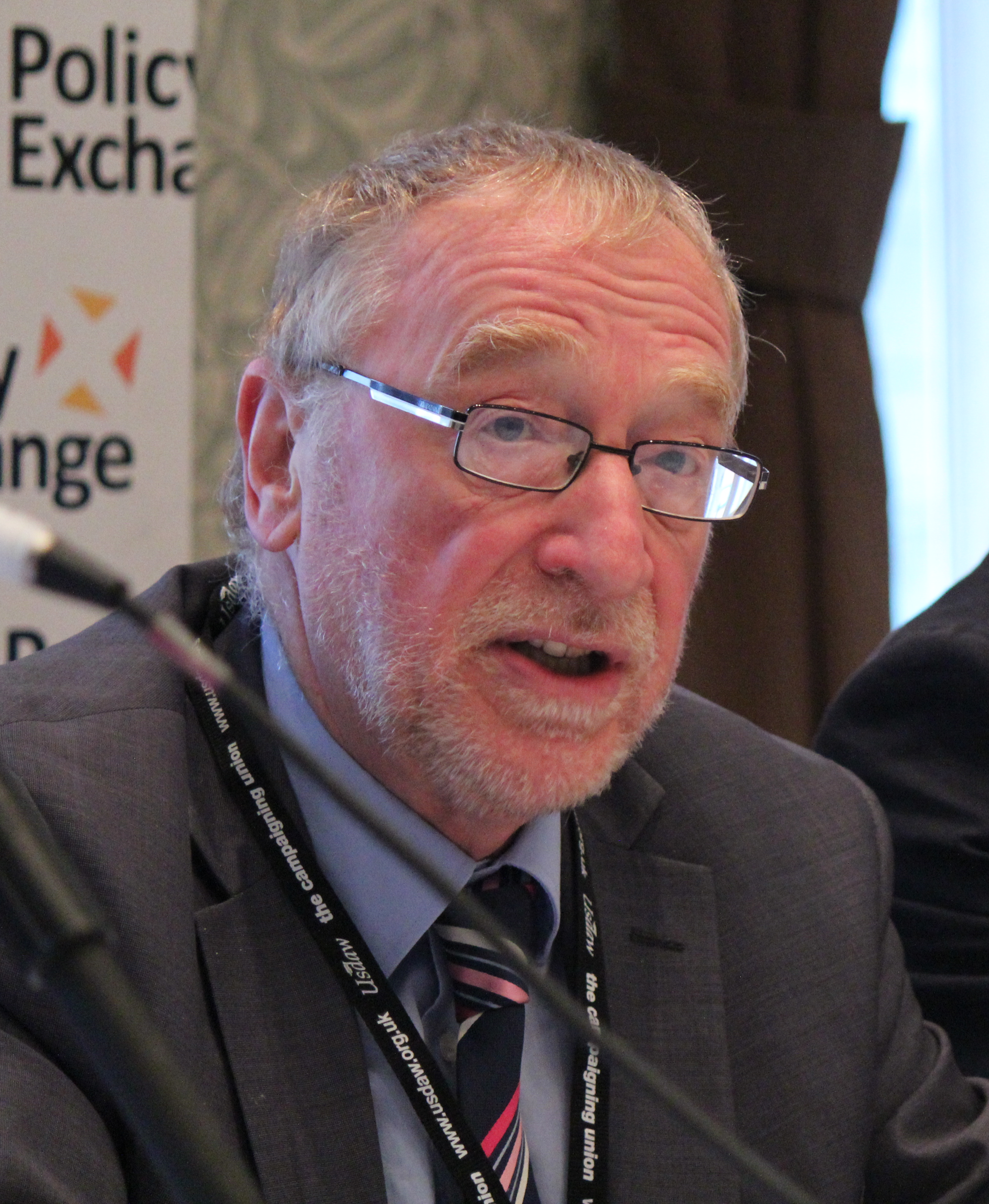
| | First party | Second party | Third party |
|---|---|---|---|
| Candidate | Adrian Bailey | Karen Bissell | Sadie Smith |
| Party | Labour | Conservative | Liberal Democrats |
| Popular vote | 9,460 | 6,408 | 1,791 |
| Percentage | 50.6% | 34.3% | 9.6% |
MP before election
Betty Boothroyd
Speaker
Elected MP
Adrian Bailey
Labour

A by-election for the United Kingdom parliamentary constituency of West Bromwich West was held on 23 November 2000, triggered by the resignation of incumbent Member of Parliament (MP) and Speaker of the House of Commons Betty Boothroyd. The by-election was won by Labour Party candidate Adrian Bailey with a 16% majority.

It was held on the same day as by-elections in Glasgow Anniesland and Preston, both of which were also won by Labour.

== Background ==
Boothroyd resigned from the House of Commons as an MP and as Speaker on 23 October 2000, triggering a writ to move the by-election.

In 1997 the major parties had observed a recent tradition by not opposing the Speaker seeking re-election. On its return to partisan politics the seat reverted to Labour, in a similar result to that seen in 1992.

== Result ==
2000 West Bromwich West by-election
| Party | Candidate | Votes | % | ±% |
|---|---|---|---|---|
| Labour | Adrian Bailey | 9,460 | 50.6 | N/A |
| Conservative | Karen Bissell | 6,408 | 34.3 | N/A |
| Liberal Democrats | Sadie Smith | 1,791 | 9.6 | N/A |
| BNP | Nick Griffin | 794 | 4.2 | N/A |
| UKIP | Jonathan Oakton | 246 | 1.3 | N/A |
| Majority | | 3,052 | 16.3 | N/A |
| Turnout | | 18,699 | 27.3 | −27.1 |
| Labour gain from Speaker | | Swing | | |

== Previous result ==
General election 1997: West Bromwich West
| Party | Candidate | Votes | % | ±% |
|---|---|---|---|---|
| Speaker | Betty Boothroyd | 23,969 | 65.3 | +10.5 |
| Independent Labour | Richard Silvester | 8,546 | 23.3 | N/A |
| National Democrats | Steve Edwards | 4,181 | 11.4 | N/A |
| Majority | | 15,423 | 42.0 | +22.7 |
| Turnout | | 36,696 | 54.4 | −16.0 |
| Speaker hold | | Swing | | |
