= John Robertson (Glasgow MP) =

British politician

Member of Parliament for Glasgow North West Glasgow Anniesland (2000–2005)
- In office 23 November 2000 – 30 March 2015
- Preceded by: Donald Dewar
- Succeeded by: Carol Monaghan
- Majority: 13,611 (38.3%)

Personal details
- Born: John Webster Robertson; 17 April 1952 (age 73) Anniesland, Scotland
- Party: Labour
- Spouse: Eleanor (m. 1973)
- Children: 3

John Webster Robertson (born 17 April 1952) is a British Labour Party politician who was the Member of Parliament (MP) for Glasgow Anniesland and Glasgow North West from 2000 to 2015. Until 2010, he was Parliamentary Private Secretary to Secretary of State for Work and Pensions Yvette Cooper.

== Early life ==
He was born in Anniesland, and was educated at Knightswood Primary School from 1957 to 1964, then Knightswood Secondary School in 1964, before going to Shawlands Senior Secondary from 1964 to 1969. He then began work at the GPO in July 1969, and as part of his work training had further education at Langside College for periods between 1969 and 1985, and at Stow College between 1971 and 1987. He left school and started work for the GPO (P.O., then British Telecom, then BT) on 14 July 1969 as a TTA (Trainee Technician Apprentice), and three years later became a Technician 2A when his initial apprenticeship ended. Robertson then trained for a further two years and became a Technical Officer. In December 1991, he was promoted to management where he stayed until he was given Voluntary Release in September 2000.

== Parliamentary career ==
Robertson joined the Labour Party in 1984 and was first elected to parliament in 2000 at a by-election on 23 November following the death of First Minister of Scotland Donald Dewar and re-elected in the 2001 election. After constituency boundaries were redrawn for the 2005 election, he was returned for the larger constituency of Glasgow North West.

Robertson rebelled against his party's Government on three occasions, most notably on a rebel amendment vote (Division No. 117) prior to the main Declaration of War – Iraq vote (Division No.118). The proposed change to the amendment read that the parliament 'believes that the case for war against Iraq has not yet been established, especially given the absence of specific United Nations authorisation; but, in the event that hostilities do commence, pledges its total support for the British forces". However, just 45 minutes later he backed the Government on the main vote authorising "all means necessary to ensure the disarmament of Iraq's weapons of mass destruction", in effect supporting the 2003 Iraq war. He later referred to these events in his September 2013 newsletter published online, in which claimed that he was "one of the 'rebels' who voted against the Iraq War in 2003." During the campaign for the 2015 general election, he participated in a hustings meeting in the Drumchapel district of his Glasgow North West constituency. In response to a question from a member of the public, he repeatedly denied that he had voted for the Iraq War. The SNP candidate, Carol Monaghan, again asserted that Robertson had voted for the Iraq War, to which he responded "not true". These denials led to heated arguments with members of the public who accused him of being a liar. Robertson was defeated by Monaghan at the subsequent election.

The other occasions on which he rebelled against his party were on the declassification of cannabis from a class B to class C drug and over the increase of the number of MSPs at the Scottish Parliament during the Scotland Parliament Bill.

He was Chair All Party Parliamentary Nuclear Energy Group and Chair of the all-party parliamentary group on Communications (apComms) and a member of the Energy and Climate Change Select Committee and the Chair of the All Party Parliamentary Nuclear Energy Group, Chair of All Party Parliamentary Music Groups, Chair All Party Parliamentary Group on Nigeria and Angola.

In November 2008, Robertson was one of 18 MPs who signed a Commons motion backing a Team GB football team at the 2012 Olympics, saying football "should not be any different from other competing sports and our young talent should be allowed to show their skills on the world stage". The football governing bodies of Scotland, Wales and Northern Ireland are all opposed to a Great Britain team, fearing it would stop them competing as individual nations in future tournaments.

He is a "strong advocate for the place of nuclear power as part of a balanced energy mix in the UK", saying that it provides "not only the cheapest low-carbon energy and therefore a significant opportunity to meet carbon emissions targets, but also with much greater energy security".

=== Alternative medicine ===
He is a supporter of homeopathy, having signed an early day motion in support of its continued funding on the National Health Service sponsored by Conservative MP David Tredinnick.

== Legislation ==
Robertson managed to change the law for blind people when he managed to get the Government to accept the amendment he tabled to the Welfare Reform Bill. It changed the rules from 1992 which restricted the higher rate of mobility allowance to people who were physically unable to walk, which meant that a blind person who could walk was denied this extra support for getting around. Under the old rules, discrimination occurred against people with a sensual disability, in favour of a physical disability, when it should have been looking at mobility.

== Personal life ==
Robertson married his wife Eleanor in 1973; they have three daughters: Wendy, Jennifer, and Laura.

== MPs' expenses scandal ==
Robertson was asked to pay back £2975 for excessive expenses claims. This included some £1750 in petty cash. John Robertson claimed £101,577.31 office running costs for 2013–14 and a further £33,861 'other costs' Independent Parliamentary Standards Authority expenses 2013–14 John Robertson employed his daughter, Laura Robertson, as Secretary/Caseworker as detailed in the Register of Members' Financial Interests

Parliament of the United Kingdom
| Preceded by Donald Dewar | Member of Parliament for Glasgow Anniesland; 2000–2005 | Constituency abolished |
| New constituency | Member of Parliament for Glasgow North West; 2005–2015 | Succeeded by Carol Monaghan |
