= Antonia Bance =

British politician

Antonia Bance MP
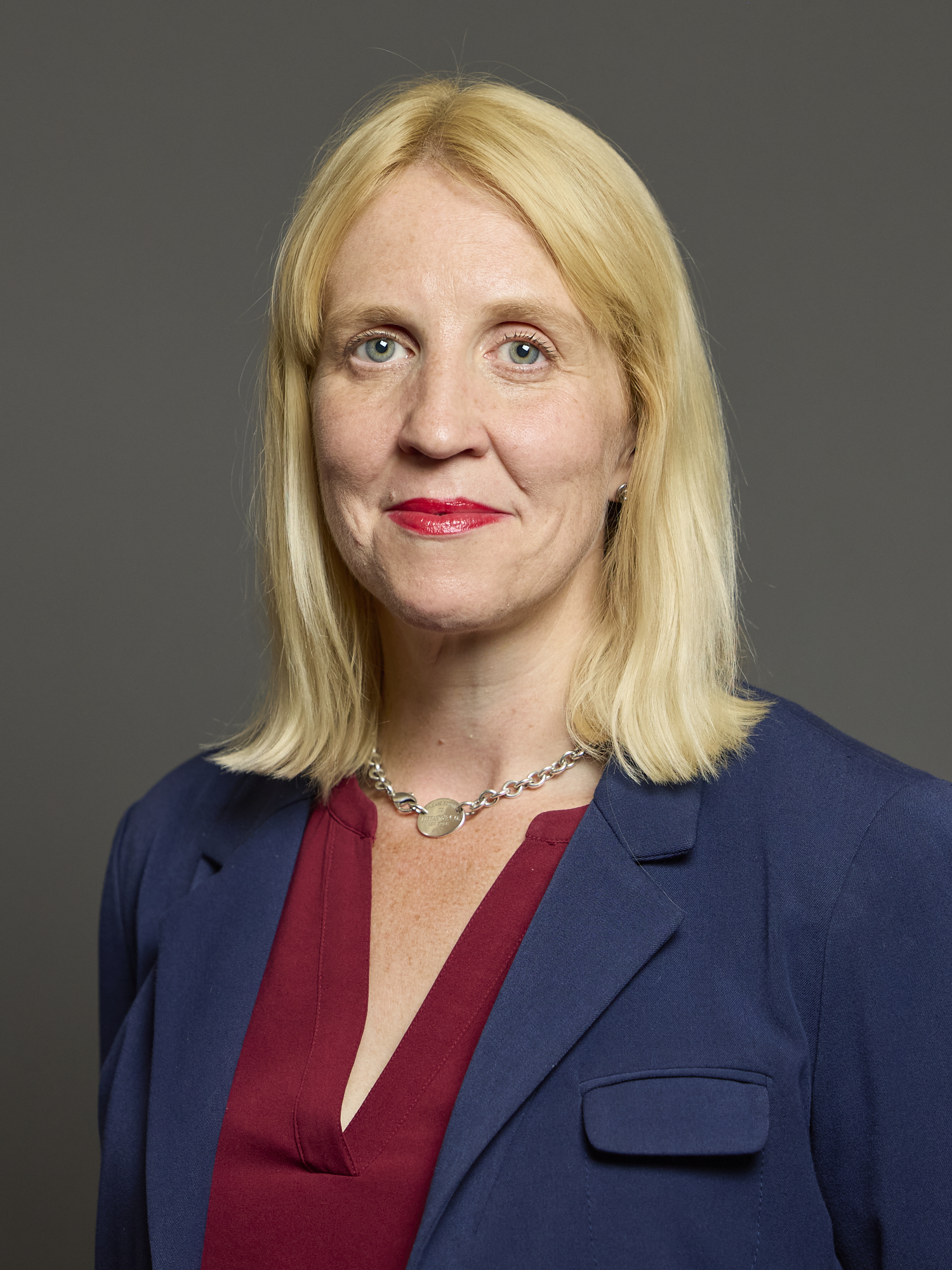
- Official portrait, 2024

Member of Parliament for Tipton and Wednesbury
- Incumbent
- Assumed office 4 July 2024
- Preceded by: Shaun Bailey
- Majority: 3,385 (10.6%)

Member of Oxford City Council for Rose Hill and Iffley
- In office 4 May 2006 – 12 March 2013
- Preceded by: William Buckingham
- Succeeded by: Michele Paule

Personal details
- Party: Labour
- Education: University of Oxford (BA)

Antonia Kay Bance is a British Labour Party politician serving as Member of Parliament for Tipton and Wednesbury since 2024.

== Early life and education ==
Bance grew up in South London. She received a Bachelor of Arts in History from the University of Oxford.

== Career before Parliament ==
Bance has worked for the housing charity Shelter and the domestic abuse charity SafeLives.

In 2015, Bance joined the Trades Union Congress as head of campaigns, communications and digital. Bance held this role until her election as an MP.

Bance was the Labour Party candidate for Oxford West and Abingdon at the 2005 general election, where she finished third.

She was a councillor on Oxford City Council from 2006 to 2013.

== Parliamentary career ==
Bance was selected as the Labour candidate for Tipton and Wednesbury on 30 May 2024, having been chosen as a candidate by the Labour Party NEC rather than the constituency Labour Party.

Bance was elected as MP at the 2024 general election with a majority of 11,755 (10.6%). The seat – previously called West Bromwich West – had been held since the 2019 election by Conservative MP Shaun Bailey, who came second in the 2024 election.

Bance is a member of the Business and Trade select committee. In December 2024, Bance questioned a representative of Amazon about union busting allegations at their Coventry centre. Bance is an officer of the All-Party Manufacturing Group.

She supported Bridget Phillipson in the 2025 deputy leadership election.

== Personal life ==
Bance is a lesbian and lives with her female partner. They have a child together.
