= 2000 Glasgow Anniesland by-elections =

By-elections held in Glasgow Anniesland, Scotland

2000 Glasgow Anniesland by-election
- 23 November 2000
	First party	Second party	Third party
	Lab	SNP	Con
Candidate	John Robertson	Grant Thoms	Dorothy Luckhurst
Party	Labour	SNP	Conservative
Popular vote	10,359	4,202	2,188
Percentage	51.7%	21.0%	10.9%
Swing	▼10.1%	▲3.9%	▼0.6%
	Fourth party	Fifth party
	Lib	Sco
Candidate	Chris McGinty	Charlie McCarthy
Party	Liberal Democrats	Scottish Socialist
Popular vote	1,630	1,441
Percentage	8.1%	7.2%
Swing	▲0.9%	▲6.5%
MP before election
Donald Dewar
Labour
Elected MP
John Robertson
Labour

By-elections for both the United Kingdom parliamentary and Scottish Parliament constituencies of Glasgow Anniesland were held on 23 November 2000 following the death of incumbent Scottish Labour Member of Parliament (MP), Member of the Scottish Parliament (MSP) and First Minister of Scotland, Donald Dewar. Both seats were retained by Labour.

Dewar, a leading figure in Scottish Labour politics, had in 1999 been elected to the Scottish Parliament where he had become First Minister of the Scottish Parliament, but he retained his seat in the Parliament of the United Kingdom intending to stand down at the next general election. However, Dewar died on 11 October 2000 from a massive brain haemorrhage, possibly brought on by a fall he suffered outside his official residence the previous day. This created a by-election for his seat of Glasgow Anniesland in the UK Parliament and Glasgow Anniesland in the Scottish Parliament.

Both elections were held on the same day, and polling day was set for 23 November. John Robertson had already been chosen to fight the seat for Labour at the general election and therefore stood at the by-election. The Labour vote declined, but with the main beneficiary being the small Scottish Socialist Party rather than the challenging Scottish National Party, the seat was comfortably held.

== Results ==
=== Westminster result ===
The turnout was 38.1%.

Westminster parliamentary by-election, 2000: Glasgow Anniesland
Party	Candidate	Votes	%	±%
Labour	John Robertson	10,359	51.7	−10.1
SNP	Grant Thoms	4,202	21.0	+3.9
Conservative	Dorothy Luckhurst	2,188	10.9	−0.6
Liberal Democrats	Chris McGinty	1,630	8.1	+0.9
Scottish Socialist	Charlie McCarthy	1,441	7.2	+6.5
Independent	William Lyden	212	1.1	New
Majority		6,337	30.7	−14.0
Turnout		20,032	38.4	−25.4
Labour hold		Swing	-7.0	

=== General election result, 1997 ===
1997 United Kingdom general election: Glasgow Anniesland
Party	Candidate	Votes	%
Labour	Donald Dewar	20,951	61.8
SNP	Bill Wilson	5,797	17.1
Conservative	Robert Brocklehurst	3,881	11.5
Liberal Democrats	Chris McGinty	2,453	7.2
ProLife Alliance	Akhtar Majid	374	1.1
Scottish Socialist	Bill Bonnar	229	0.7
UKIP	Alan Milligan	86	0.3
Referendum	Gillian McKay	84	0.2
Natural Law	Thomas Pringle	24	0.1
Majority		15,154	44.7
Turnout		33,879	63.8
Labour win (new seat)			

=== Scottish Parliament result ===
Scottish Parliament by-election, 2000: Glasgow Anniesland
Party	Candidate	Votes	%	±%
Labour	Bill Butler	9,838	48.7	−10.1
SNP	Tom Chalmers	4,462	22.1	+1.9
Conservative	Kate Pickering	2,148	10.6	±0.0
Scottish Socialist	Rosie Kane	1,429	7.0	+3.5
Liberal Democrats	Judith Fryer	1,384	6.8	+0.5
Green	Alistair Whitelaw	662	3.3	New
Socialist Labour	Murdo Ritchie	298	1.5	+1.0
Majority		5,376	26.6	−12.0
Turnout		20,211	38.3	−13.6
Labour hold		Swing		

1999 Scottish Parliament election: Glasgow Anniesland
Party	Candidate	Votes	%
Labour	Donald Dewar	16,749	58.8
SNP	Kaukab Stewart	5,756	20.2
Conservative	Bill Aitken	3,032	10.6
Liberal Democrats	Iain Brown	1,804	6.3
Scottish Socialist	Ann Lynch	1,000	3.5
Socialist Labour	Edward Boyd	139	0.5
Majority		10,993	38.6
Turnout		28,480	51.9
Labour win (new seat)			

== See also ==
- Glasgow Anniesland (UK Parliament constituency)
- Glasgow Anniesland (Scottish Parliament constituency)
- Elections in Scotland
- List of by-elections to the Scottish Parliament
- Lists of United Kingdom by-elections
