= Thriplow =

Village in Cambridgeshire, England

Coordinates: 52.1°N 0.1°E

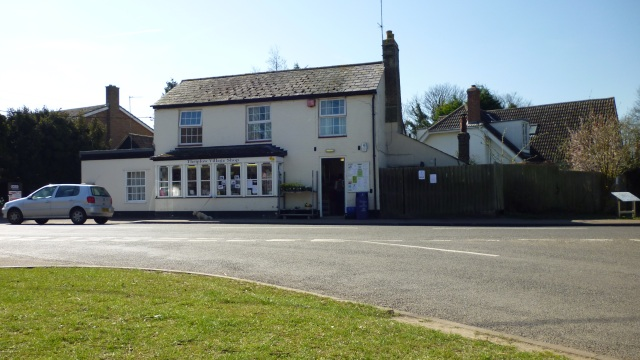
- Thriplow Village Stores

- Location within Cambridgeshire
- Population: 847 (2001); 1,164 (2011)
- OS grid reference: TL438467
- Civil parish: Thriplow and Heathfield
- District: South Cambridgeshire
- Shire county: Cambridgeshire
- Region: East
- Country: England
- Sovereign state: United Kingdom
- Post town: ROYSTON
- Postcode district: SG8
- Dialling code: 01763
- Police: Cambridgeshire
- Fire: Cambridgeshire
- Ambulance: East of England
- UK Parliament: South Cambridgeshire
- Website: www.thriplow.org.uk

Thriplow (/ˈtrɪploʊ/) is a village in Cambridgeshire, England, 8 miles (13 km) south of Cambridge. The village also gives its name to a former Cambridgeshire hundred.

== History ==
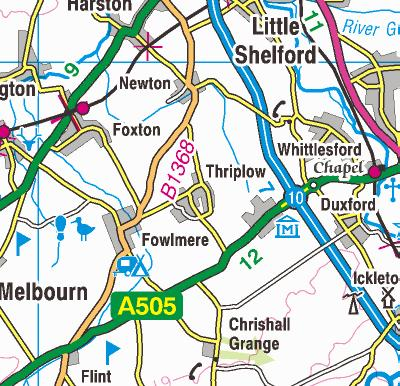
Thriplow and surrounding villages

The parish of Thriplow covers 1,012 hectares (2,501 acres), roughly spanning the land between the former London to Cambridge coaching road (now the B1368) and the Royston to Newmarket road (now the A505). The presence of tumuli in the south of the parish suggests an Iron Age settlement, and a barrow to the east of the village contains a Bronze Age burial. The village itself probably existed in Romano-British times (around AD 150). The Icknield Way to the south of the village was probably an important factor in the village's growth.

Listed as Tripelan in around 1050 and Trepeslau in the Domesday Book of 1086, the name "Thriplow" means "Hill or tumulus of a man called Tryppa". Tryppa is believed to have been a Bronze Age chieftain who may be buried in the tumulus just southeast of the church.

In 1647 the New Model Army camped on Thriplow Heath (often referred to in contemporary accounts as "Triploe Heath") after its refusal to disband during its dispute with Parliament.

Thirteen Thriplow residents are recorded to have perished in the First World War and three in the Second World War.

In recent times the hamlet of Heathfield has built up in the southeast of the parish alongside the Imperial War Museum Duxford, with most of the housing dating from the 2000s. Its population (around 600) is now larger than that of Thriplow village (around 440).

On 1 April 2021, the civil parish was renamed "Thriplow and Heathfield".

== Church ==
There has been a church in Thriplow since at least the 12th century. In 1284 the tithes of Thriplow Church were used to found Peterhouse in Cambridge, and the first recorded vicar, John de Hyndrayngham, was installed in 1299.

The parish church of St George (dedicated to All Saints until the 19th century) dates from the late 13th century and consists of a chancel with a north vestry, north and south transepts, a central tower with short spire, and a nave with south porch. The tower and spire date from the 14th century. The south porch was rebuilt by Gilbert Scott in 1877.

The iconoclast William Dowsing mutilated the church screen in 1644.

The parish is now held with that of Fowlmere, and no vicar has lived in Thriplow since 1936.

== Village life ==
Thriplow has one public house, The Green Man, which has been open since the first half of the 19th century. As of 1 October 2012, The Green Man has been operated as a limited company and owned by 71 local shareholders. Former pubs include The Fox, on the east side of Church Street, open in the early 19th century; it burned down in 1919. The Red Lion at the north end of Middle Street burned down around 1941 with the site taken by the village hall in 1958.

The village shop last operated as an independent commercial concern between 1997 and 2000. After that there were several failed attempts to continue the shop as a business, and the management was finally taken over by the Thriplow Village Shop Association in June–July 2007. The village has a recreation ground, a primary school, a village hall, a cricket ground and a Church.

The smithy on the village green was still open in the early 1960s but was given to the village in 1964 as a museum. It opens twice a year when the blacksmith gives a demonstration of traditional skills.

Thriplow also contains two sites of special scientific interest: Thriplow Meadows and Thriplow Peat Holes.

== Notable people ==
- Betty Boothroyd, Baroness Boothroyd, the first female Speaker of the House of Commons, lived in Thriplow in her later years; her funeral was held at St George's Church, where she is buried.

== The Thriplow Daffodil Weekend ==
This tradition started in 1969, to raise money for repairs to the church, and has run each year since (except for 2001 when the weekend was cancelled due to foot-and-mouth disease, and 2020/21 when it was cancelled due to the COVID-19 pandemic). The event is organised by the Daffodil Weekend Trust and raises funds for a different charity each year, with the charity for 2014 being Home Start. There are numerous attractions during the weekend including heavy horses giving dray rides, children's entertainment, sheepdog working, open gardens and stalls. New for 2014 was a miniature steam railway on the Cricket Meadow, and over the last two years, the weekend has hosted a Taste of Thriplow.

== See also ==
- List of Sites of Special Scientific Interest in Cambridgeshire
