= Glasgow Anniesland (UK Parliament constituency) =

UK Parliament constituency (1997–2005)

- Former burgh constituency for the House of Commons
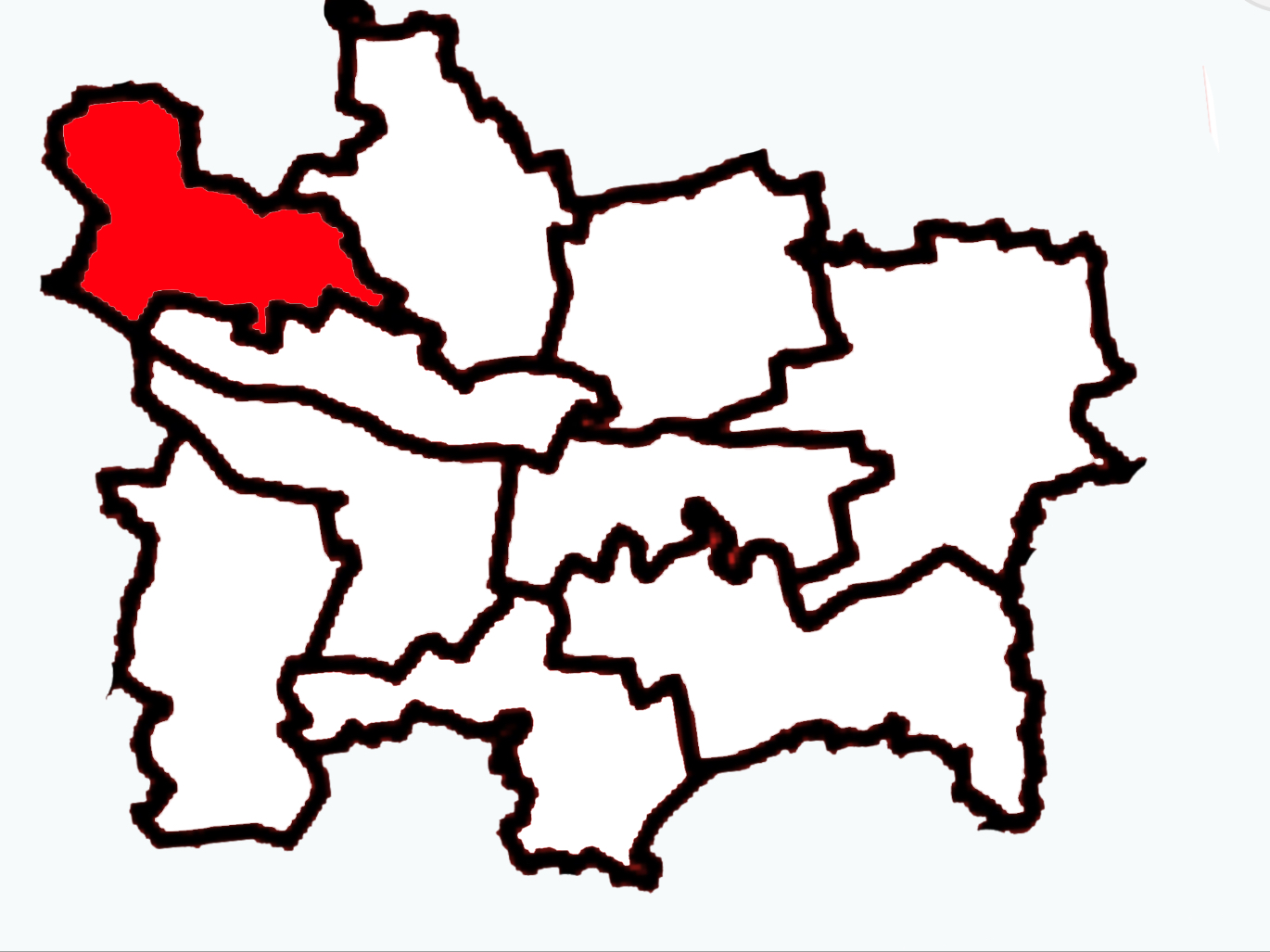
- Boundary of Glasgow Anniesland in Glasgow Anniesland showed in red
- Subdivision: Glasgow City council area

1997–2005
- Seats: One
- Created from: Glasgow Garscadden
- Replaced by: Glasgow North West; Glasgow North

Glasgow Anniesland was a burgh constituency represented in the House of Commons of the Parliament of the United Kingdom from 1997 until 2005, when it was replaced by the larger Glasgow North West, with the exception of Kelvindale which joined Glasgow North.

It elected one Member of Parliament (MP) using the first-past-the-post voting system, and was represented by Donald Dewar until his death in 2000.

== Boundaries ==
The City of Glasgow District electoral divisions of Drumchapel/Blairdardie, Jordanhill/Kelvindale, and Yoker/Knightswood.

Anniesland was situated on the north western outskirts of the city of Glasgow, stretching from Drumchapel on the boundaries with Clydebank to the Botanic Gardens in Glasgow's West End.

== Members of Parliament ==
Election	Member	Party	Notes
1997	Donald Dewar	Labour	First Minister of Scotland 1999–2000. Died October 2000
2000 by-election	John Robertson	Labour	
2005	constituency abolished		

== Elections ==
=== Elections of the 2000s ===
General election 2001: Glasgow Anniesland
Party	Candidate	Votes	%	±%
Labour	John Robertson	15,102	56.5	−5.3
SNP	Grant Thoms	4,048	15.1	−2.0
Liberal Democrats	Christopher McGinty	3,244	12.1	+4.9
Conservative	Stewart Connell	2,651	9.9	−1.6
Scottish Socialist	Charlie McCarthy	1,486	5.6	+4.9
Socialist Labour	Katherine McGavigan	191	0.7	New
Majority		11,054	41.4	−3.3
Turnout		26,722	50.1	−13.7
Labour hold		Swing	−1.7	

By-election 2000: Glasgow Anniesland
Party	Candidate	Votes	%	±%
Labour	John Robertson	10,359	51.7	−10.1
SNP	Grant Thoms	4,202	21.0	+3.9
Conservative	Dorothy A. Luckhurst	2,188	10.9	−0.6
Liberal Democrats	Christopher McGinty	1,630	8.1	+0.9
Scottish Socialist	Charlie McCarthy	1,441	7.2	+6.5
Independent	William Lyden	212	1.1	New
Majority		6,337	30.7	−14.0
Turnout		20,212	38.4	−25.4
Labour hold		Swing	-7.0	

=== Elections of the 1990s ===
General election 1997: Glasgow Anniesland
Party	Candidate	Votes	%	±%
Labour	Donald Dewar	20,951	61.8	
SNP	Bill Wilson	5,797	17.1	
Conservative	Robert A.P. Brocklehurst	3,881	11.5	
Liberal Democrats	Christopher McGinty	2,453	7.2	
ProLife Alliance	Akhtar Majid	374	1.1	
Scottish Socialist	Bill Bonnar	229	0.7	
UKIP	Alan H. Milligan	86	0.3	
Referendum	Gillian McKay	84	0.2	
Natural Law	Thomas J. Pringle	24	0.1	
Majority		15,154	44.7	
Turnout		33,879	63.8	
Labour win (new seat)				

== See also ==
- Glasgow Anniesland (Scottish Parliament constituency)
