= Glasgow West =

UK Parliament constituency (since 2024)

- Burgh constituency for the House of Commons
- Interactive map of current boundaries
- Boundary of Glasgow West in Scotland
- Subdivisions of Scotland: Glasgow
- Electorate: 72,499 (March 2020)
- Major settlements: Anniesland, Kelvindale

Current constituency
- Created: 2024
- Member of Parliament: Patricia Ferguson (Scottish Labour Party)
- Seats: One
- Created from: Glasgow North West & Glasgow North

Glasgow West is a constituency of the House of Commons in the UK Parliament. The constituency was created by the 2023 review of Westminster constituencies and was first contested at the 2024 general election, since when it has been represented by Patricia Ferguson of Scottish Labour.

== Boundaries ==
The constituency consists of the following Glasgow City Council wards or part wards:

- The whole of Victoria Park ward;
- the bulk of Garscadden/Scotstounhill - excluding a small area to the west which is included in West Dunbartonshire;
- the whole of Drumchapel/Anniesland ward; and
- the majority of Partick East/Kelvindale ward - mostly to the south of the A82 Great Western Road.

It was formed primarily from the abolished Glasgow North West constituency, excluding the part transferred to West Dunbartonshire, with the addition of the Partick and Hyndland districts from Glasgow North.

== Members of Parliament ==
| Election | Member | Party |
|---|---|---|
| 2024 | Patricia Ferguson | Scottish Labour |

== Election results ==
=== Elections in the 2020s ===
General election 2024: Glasgow West
| Party | Candidate | Votes | % | ±% |
|---|---|---|---|---|
| Labour | Patricia Ferguson | 18,621 | 46.7 | +18.7 |
| SNP | Carol Monaghan | 12,175 | 30.5 | −18.1 |
| Green | Nick Quail | 3,662 | 9.2 | +8.8 |
| Reform UK | Dionne Moore | 2,098 | 5.3 | +5.1 |
| Conservative | Faten Hameed | 1,720 | 4.3 | −11.0 |
| Liberal Democrats | James Calder | 1,316 | 3.3 | −4.2 |
| Scottish Christian | John Cormack | 310 | 0.8 | N/A |
| Majority | | 6,446 | 16.2 | N/A |
| Turnout | | 39,902 | 57.8 | −7.4 |
| Registered electors | | 69,028 | | |
| Labour gain from SNP | | Swing | +18.4 | |

=== Elections in the 2010s ===
2019 notional result (Note: Estimate of the 2019 general election result as if the revised boundaries recommended under the 2023 boundary review were in place)
| Party | Vote | % |
|---|---|---|
| SNP | 22,964 | 48.6 |
| Labour | 13,236 | 28.0 |
| Conservative | 7,254 | 15.3 |
| Liberal Democrats | 3,554 | 7.5 |
| Scottish Greens | 180 | 0.4 |
| Brexit Party | 74 | 0.2 |
| Majority | 9,728 | 20.6 |
| Turnout | 47,262 | 65.2 |
| Electorate | 72,499 | |
