= Glasgow North West =

UK Parliament constituency (2005–2024)

Coordinates: 55°53′28″N 4°21′05″W

- Former burgh constituency for the House of Commons
- Boundary of Glasgow North West in Scotland
- Subdivision: Glasgow City
- Major settlements: Anniesland, Drumchapel, Hyndland, Jordanhill

2005–2024
- Created from: Glasgow Anniesland; Glasgow Kelvin
- Replaced by: Glasgow West

Glasgow North West was a constituency of the House of Commons of the Parliament of the United Kingdom (Westminster). It was first used at the 2005 general election and was abolished at the 2024 election, being replaced by Glasgow West.

== Boundaries ==
Map of boundaries 2005–2024

The Glasgow City wards of Anniesland, Blairdardie, Drumry, Hayburn, Jordanhill, Knightswood Park, Knightswood South, Scotstoun, Summerhill, Victoria Park, and Yoker.

Glasgow North West was one of seven constituencies covering the Glasgow City council area, all are entirely within the city area.

Prior to the 2005 general election, the city area was covered by ten constituencies, of which two straddled boundaries with other council areas. The area of the North West constituency was covered by most of the Glasgow Anniesland constituency and part of the Glasgow Kelvin constituency.

Further to the completion of the 2023 Periodic Review of Westminster constituencies, the seat was subject to boundary changes and renamed Glasgow West.

== Constituency profile ==
Glasgow North West lay on the north bank of the River Clyde. It was a seat of contrasts, taking in affluent areas of Glasgow, such as Jordanhill and Scotstoun, as well as more deprived areas, such as the Drumchapel housing estate. The constituency was formerly a safe seat for the Labour Party.

== Members of Parliament ==
Election	Member	Party
2005	John Robertson	Labour
2015	Carol Monaghan	SNP

== Election results ==
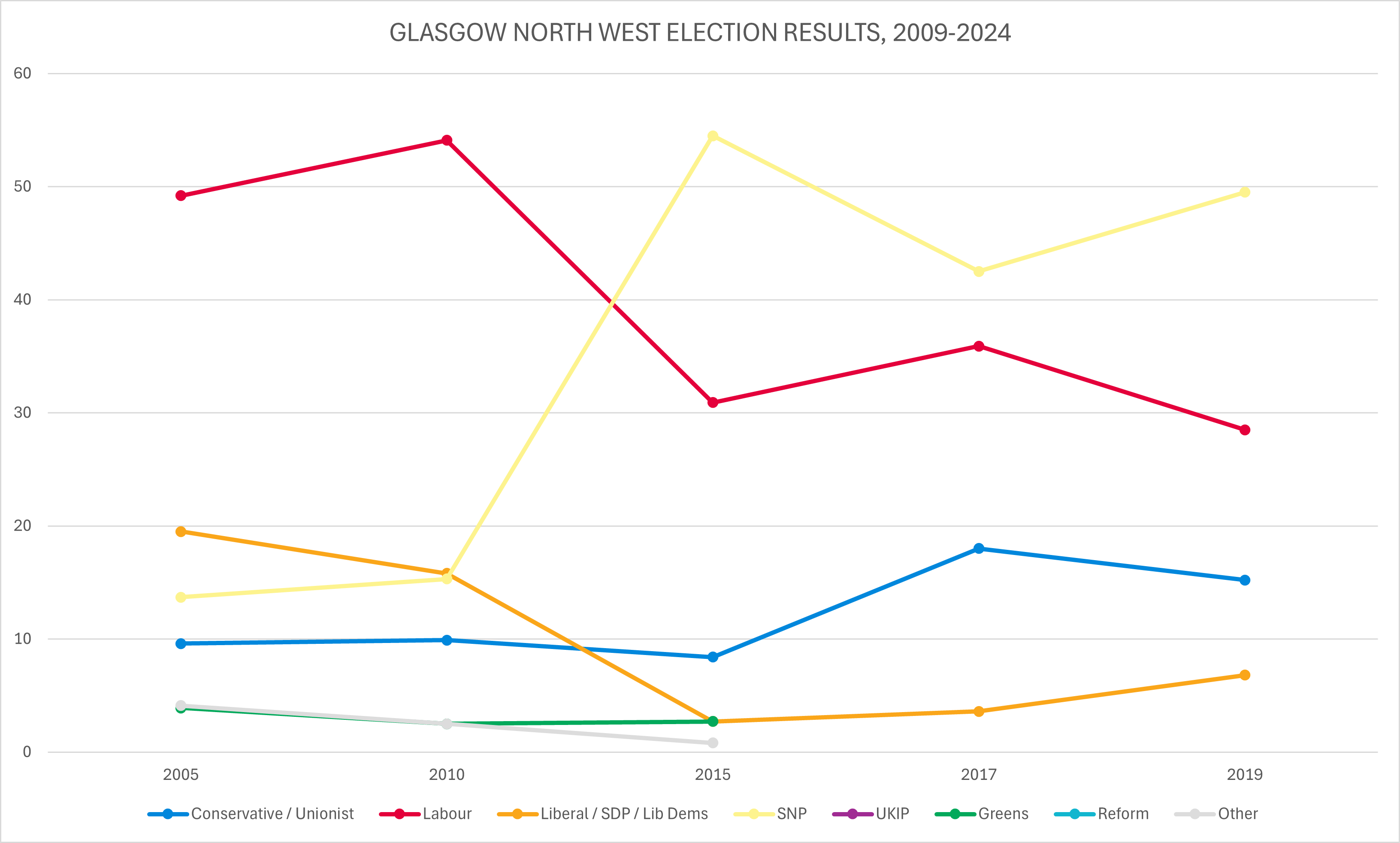
Election results 2005-2019

=== Elections in the 2010s ===
General election 2019: Glasgow North West
Party	Candidate	Votes	%	±%
SNP	Carol Monaghan	19,678	49.5	+7.0
Labour	Patricia Ferguson	11,319	28.5	−7.4
Conservative	Ade Aibinu	6,022	15.2	−2.8
Liberal Democrats	James Speirs	2,716	6.8	+3.2
Majority		8,359	21.0	+14.4
Turnout		39,735	62.7	+1.9
SNP hold		Swing	+7.2	

General election 2017: Glasgow North West
Party	Candidate	Votes	%	±%
SNP	Carol Monaghan	16,508	42.5	−12.0
Labour	Michael Shanks	13,947	35.9	+5.0
Conservative	Christopher Land	7,002	18.0	+9.6
Liberal Democrats	James Speirs	1,387	3.6	+0.9
Majority		2,561	6.6	−17.0
Turnout		38,844	60.8	−3.3
SNP hold		Swing	-8.5	

General election 2015: Glasgow North West
Party	Candidate	Votes	%	±%
SNP	Carol Monaghan	23,908	54.5	+39.2
Labour	John Robertson	13,544	30.9	−23.2
Conservative	Roger Lewis	3,692	8.4	−1.5
Liberal Democrats	James Harrison	1,194	2.7	−13.1
Green	Moira Crawford	1,167	2.7	+0.2
CISTA	Chris MacKenzie	213	0.5	New
Communist	Zoe Hennessy	136	0.3	−0.2
Majority		10,364	23.6	N/A
Turnout		43,854	64.1	+5.7
SNP gain from Labour		Swing	+31.3	

General election 2010: Glasgow North West
Party	Candidate	Votes	%	±%
Labour	John Robertson	19,233	54.1	+4.9
Liberal Democrats	Natalie McKee	5,622	15.8	–3.7
SNP	Margaret Park	5,430	15.3	+1.6
Conservative	Richard Sullivan	3,537	9.9	+0.3
Green	Moira Crawford	882	2.5	–1.4
BNP	Scott McLean	699	2.0	New
Communist	Marc Livingstone	179	0.5	New
Majority		13,611	38.3	+8.6
Turnout		35,582	58.4	+3.4
Labour hold		Swing	+4.3	

=== Elections in the 2000s ===
General election 2005: Glasgow North West
Party	Candidate	Votes	%	±%
Labour	John Robertson	16,748	49.2	−5.7
Liberal Democrats	Paul Graham	6,655	19.5	+7.8
SNP	Graeme Hendry	4,676	13.7	−2.4
Conservative	Murray Roxburgh	3,262	9.6	+0.2
Green	Martha Wardrop	1,333	3.9	
Scottish Socialist	Anthea Irwin	1,108	3.3	−2.9
Socialist Labour	Colin Muir	279	0.8	New
Majority		10,093	29.7	
Turnout		34,061	55.0	+4.2
Labour hold		Swing	-6.8	

== See also ==
- Politics of Glasgow
