= Tipton and Wednesbury =

UK Parliament constituency (since 2024)

- Borough constituency for the House of Commons
- Boundary of Tipton and Wednesbury in West Midlands region
- County: West Midlands county
- Major settlements: Wednesbury, Coseley, Tipton, West Bromwich (part)

Current constituency
- Created: 2024
- Member of Parliament: Antonia Bance (Labour)
- Seats: One
- Created from: West Bromwich East & West Bromwich West

Tipton and Wednesbury is a constituency of the House of Commons in the UK Parliament. Further to the completion of the 2023 review of Westminster constituencies, it was first contested at the 2024 general election. It is represented by Antonia Bance of the Labour Party.

The constituency name refers to the towns of Tipton and Wednesbury.

== Constituency profile ==
Tipton

Tipton and Wednesbury is a constituency in the West Midlands county of England. It covers the towns of Coseley, Tipton and Wednesbury, and the West Bromwich suburbs of Hill Top and Hateley Heath.

This is an urban constituency within the Black Country, an area of connected towns between Birmingham and Wolverhampton. These towns are considered one of the birthplaces of the Industrial Revolution and have a history of coal mining and ironmaking. This is one of the country's most deprived constituencies; like many former industrial towns in the Midlands, the deindustrialisation of the late 20th century left this area with high levels of unemployment. Most residents live in semi-detached or dense terraced properties. House prices across the constituency are generally lower than the rest of the West Midlands region and the average price is less than half the UK average.

Residents of Tipton and Wednesbury have a below-average age with a low proportion of retirees. They have low levels of income and homeownership and the child poverty rate is nearly double the UK-wide rate. Residents have very low levels of education and a high proportion work in the manufacturing, retail and transport sectors. The percentage claiming unemployment benefits is very high. White people made up 70% of the population at the 2021 census. Asians, mostly of Indian Sikh origin, were the largest ethnic minority group at 17%. Black people made up 7% of residents.

At the local council level, most of this constituency is represented by Reform UK with some Labour Party councillors elected in Hateley Heath. Voters in Tipton and Wednesbury overwhelmingly supported leaving the European Union in the 2016 referendum; an estimated 74% voted in favour of Brexit compared to the UK-wide figure of 52%, the third-highest percentage out of 650 constituencies nationwide according to Electoral Calculus.

== Boundaries ==
Tipton and Wednesbury contains the following as they existed on 1 December 2020:

In the Borough of Sandwell:

- The wards of Great Bridge, Princes End, Tipton Green, Wednesbury North and Wednesbury South from the former West Bromwich West constituency
- The wards of Friar Park and Hateley Heath from the former West Bromwich East constituency

In the Borough of Dudley:

- The ward of Coseley East^{1} from the Wolverhampton South East constituency

^{1} Renamed Coseley following a local government boundary review in Dudley which became effective from May 2024.

== Elections ==
=== Elections in the 2020s ===
General election 2024: Tipton and Wednesbury
Party	Candidate	Votes	%	±%
Labour	Antonia Bance	11,755	36.9	−1.5
Conservative	Shaun Bailey	8,370	26.3	−24.4
Reform	Jack Sabharwal	8,019	25.2	+19.4
Green	Mark Redding	1,509	4.7	+2.8
Independent	Mohammed Hussain-Billa	945	3.0	N/A
Independent	Abdul Husen	660	2.1	N/A
Liberal Democrats	Mark Rochell	592	1.9	−1.2
Majority		3,385	10.6	
Turnout		31,850	43.0	−8.7
Labour win (new seat)				

== See also ==
- parliamentary constituencies in the West Midlands (county)
