= Betty Boothroyd =

British politician (1929–2023)

The Right Honourable The Baroness Boothroyd OM PC
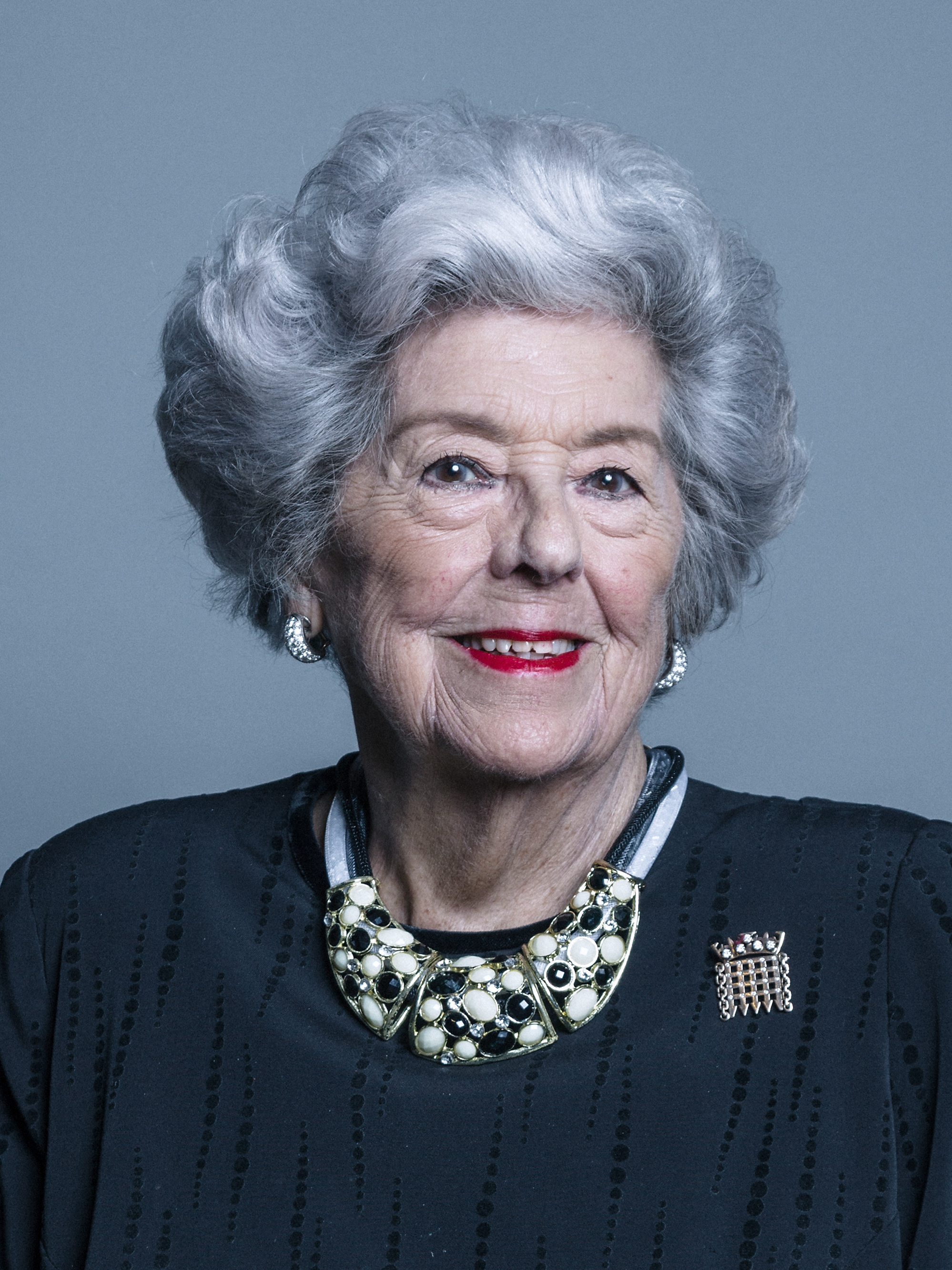
- Official portrait, 2018

Speaker of the House of Commons of the United Kingdom
- In office 28 April 1992 – 23 October 2000
- Monarch: Elizabeth II
- Prime Minister: John Major; Tony Blair
- Preceded by: Bernard Weatherill
- Succeeded by: Michael Martin

Deputy Speaker of the House of Commons; Second Deputy Chair of Ways and Means
- In office 17 June 1987 – 27 April 1992
- Speaker: Bernard Weatherill
- Preceded by: Paul Dean
- Succeeded by: Janet Fookes

Member of the House of Lords
- Lord Temporal
- Life peerage 15 January 2001 – 26 February 2023

Member of Parliament for West Bromwich West West Bromwich (1973–1974)
- In office 24 May 1973 – 23 October 2000
- Preceded by: Maurice Foley
- Succeeded by: Adrian Bailey

Personal details
- Born: 8 October 1929 Dewsbury, West Riding of Yorkshire, England
- Died: 26 February 2023 (aged 93) Cambridge, England
- Resting place: St George's Church, Thriplow, Cambridgeshire, England
- Party: Labour League of Youth (before 1992); Labour (before 1992); Speaker (1992–2000); Crossbench (from 2001)
- Education: Kirklees College
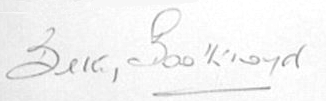
- Signature

Betty Boothroyd, Baroness Boothroyd (8 October 1929 – 26 February 2023), was a British politician who served as a member of Parliament (MP) for West Bromwich and West Bromwich West from 1973 to 2000. A member of the Labour Party, she served as Speaker of the House of Commons from 1992 to 2000. She was previously a Deputy Speaker from 1987 to 1992. She was the first and as of 2026, the only woman to serve as Speaker. Boothroyd later sat in the House of Lords as, in accordance with tradition, a crossbench peer.

== Early life ==
Boothroyd was born in Dewsbury, West Yorkshire, in 1929, as the only child of Ben Archibald Boothroyd (1886–1948) and his second wife Mary (née Butterfield, 1901–1982), both textile workers.

Boothroyd was educated at council schools and went on to study at Dewsbury College of Commerce and Art (now Kirklees College). Boothroyd joined the Labour Party as a teenager. She attended Labour League of Youth rallies in Huddersfield, Leeds and Wakefield to listen to speeches by Labour politicians Clement Attlee, Jennie Lee, Aneurin Bevan and Alice Bacon.

Boothroyd's first job was at Bickers department store in Dewsbury. From 1946 to 1952, she worked as a dancer, as a member of the Tiller Girls dancing troupe, briefly appearing at the London Palladium in the West End. A foot infection brought an end to her dancing career and she entered politics, something then unusual, as the political world was heavily male-dominated and mostly aristocratic.

During the mid-to-late 1950s, Boothroyd worked as secretary to Labour MPs Barbara Castle and Geoffrey de Freitas. In 1960, she travelled to the United States to see the Kennedy campaign. She subsequently worked in Washington, DC as a legislative assistant to American Congressman Silvio Conte, between 1960 and 1962. When she returned to London, she resumed her work as a secretary and political assistant to various senior Labour politicians including Under-Secretary of State for Foreign Affairs Harry Walston. In 1965, she was elected to a seat on Hammersmith Borough Council, in Gibbs Green ward, where she remained until 1968.

== Member of Parliament ==
Standing for the Labour Party, Boothroyd contested several seats – Leicester South East in 1957, Peterborough in 1959, Nelson and Colne in 1968, and Rossendale in 1970 – before being elected Member of Parliament (MP) for West Bromwich in a by-election in May 1973. She represented the constituency for 27 years and was succeeded by Adrian Bailey in 2000.

In 1974, Boothroyd was appointed an assistant Government Whip. In 1975, she became a Government-appointed member of the then European Common Assembly (ECSC) until she was discharged in 1977. In 1979, she became a member of the Select committee on Foreign Affairs, until 1981, and of the Speaker's Panel of Chairmen, until 1 January 2000. She was a member of the Labour Party National Executive Committee (NEC) from 1981 to 1987, and the House of Commons Commission from 1983 to 1987.

=== Deputy Speaker and Speaker ===
==== Election ====
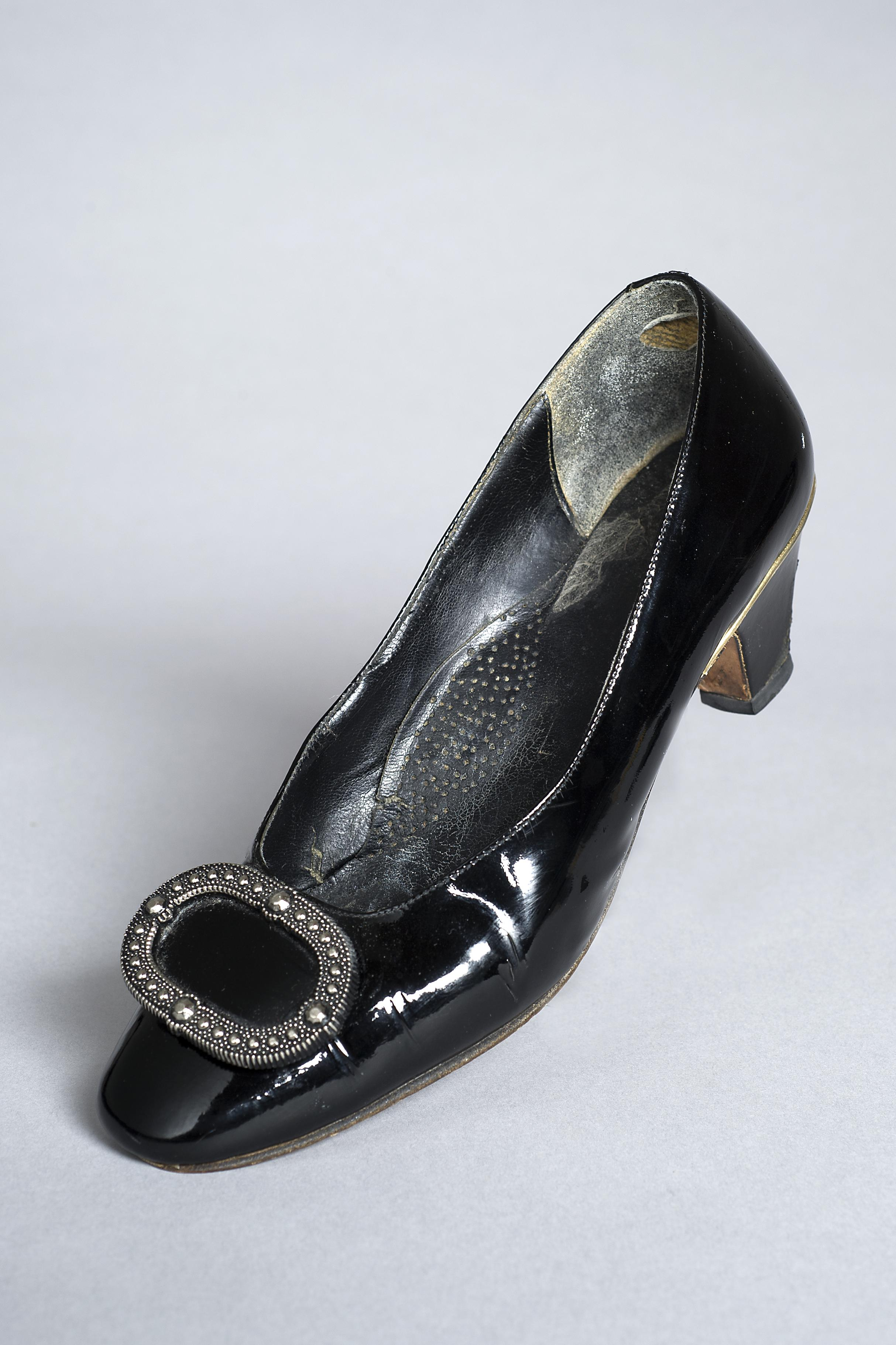
Boothroyd's Speaker's shoe in the Women's Library

Following the 1987 general election Boothroyd became a Deputy Speaker to the Speaker Bernard Weatherill. She was the second female Deputy Speaker in British history after Betty Harvie Anderson. In 1992 she was elected Speaker by a cross-party majority 372 to 238 votes, becoming the first woman to hold the position and the first Opposition MP to be elected Speaker. After her election, MPs broke with Commons protocol by standing and applauding her to her chair.

There was debate about whether Boothroyd should wear the traditional Speaker's Wig. She chose not to but stated that any subsequent Speakers would be free to choose to wear the wig or not; none have since done so. In answer to the debate as to how she should be addressed as Speaker, Boothroyd said: "Call me Madam".

==== Career as Speaker ====
In 1992, Boothroyd was named Parliamentarian of the Year.

In July 1992, Boothroyd expelled Dennis Skinner from the Commons when he refused to withdraw remarks that John Gummer was a "wart" and a "little "squirt." In July 1994, Boothroyd "forced" Rod Richards to apologise to her and the house for calling Peter Hain a "liar". She also suspended Northern Ireland MP Ian Paisley for "un-Parliamentary language."

In 1993, the Government won a vote on the Social Chapter of the Maastricht Treaty due to her casting vote (exercised in accordance with Speaker Denison's rule). It was subsequently discovered that Boothroyd's casting vote had not been required, as the votes had been miscounted, and the Government had won by one vote.

Boothroyd was keen to get young people interested in politics, and in the 1990s appeared as a special guest on the BBC's Saturday morning children's programme Live & Kicking. She featured on the BBC Radio 4 programme Desert Island Discs in 1993. Her favourite track was Rock-A-Bye by Judy Garland, her book was A Suitable Boy by Vikram Seth and her luxury item was the Mace of the House of Commons.

In March 1997, Boothroyd banned bleepers and electronic prompters from the Commons chamber.

In May 1997, Boothroyd was re-elected as Speaker unopposed, polling a doubled majority of 15,423. She was nominated by Gwyeth Dunwoody.

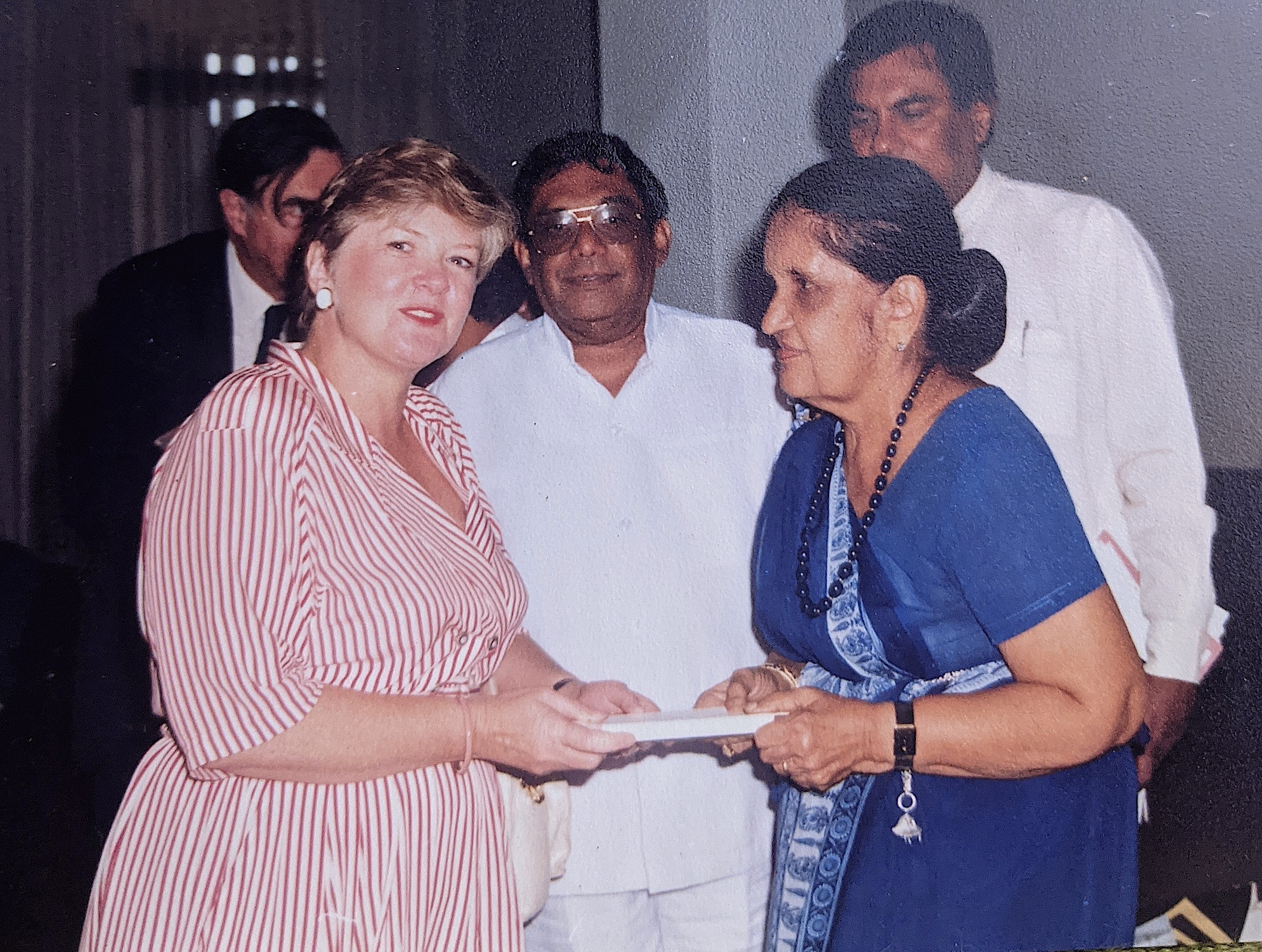
Boothroyd meeting Prime Minister of Sri Lanka Sirimavo Bandaranaike

Boothroyd represented the Commons internationally by speaking at Parliamentary lower houses, including the United States House of Representatives, the Russian Duma and the Indian Lok Sabha. She met political leaders including President of South Africa Nelson Mandela and Prime Minister of Sri Lanka Sirimavo Bandaranaike.

On 12 July 2000, following Prime Minister's Questions, Boothroyd announced to the House of Commons she would resign as Speaker after the summer recess. Tony Blair, then prime minister, paid tribute to her as "something of a national institution". Blair's predecessor, John Major, described her as an "outstanding Speaker". She stepped down as Speaker and resigned as an MP on 23 October 2000. In farewell speech she said: "Remember always that the privileges that this House enjoys were dearly won and must never be squandered." She was succeeded by Michael Martin.

Her signature catchphrase in closing Prime Minister's Questions each week was "Time's up!"

Alongside her political career, Boothroyd served as president of the Chartered Society of Physiotherapy (CSP) from 1996 to 2000.

== Life peerage and later activity ==
Boothroyd was awarded an honorary Doctor of Civil Law (Hon DCL) degree by City University London in 1993. She was chancellor of the Open University from 1994 until October 2006 and donated some of her personal papers to the University's archives. In March 1995, she was awarded an honorary degree from The Open University as Doctor of the University (DUniv). In 1999 she was made an Honorary Fellow of St Hugh's College, Oxford. Two portraits of Boothroyd have been part of the parliamentary art collection since 1994 and 1999, respectively.

On 15 January 2001, she was created a life peer, taking as her title Baroness Boothroyd, of Sandwell in the County of West Midlands. Her autobiography was published in the same year. In April 2005, she was appointed a Member of the Order of Merit (OM), an honour in the personal gift of the Queen.

Boothroyd was made an Honorary Fellow of the Society of Light and Lighting (Hon. FSLL) in 2009, and she was an Honorary Fellow of St Hugh's College, Oxford, and of St Edmund's College, Cambridge. She was Patron of the Jo Richardson Community School in Dagenham, East London, and President of NBFA Assisting the Elderly. She was, for a period, Vice President of the Industry and Parliament Trust.

In January 2011, Boothroyd posited that Deputy Prime Minister Nick Clegg's plans for some members of the upper house to be directly elected could leave Britain in constitutional disarray: "It is wantonly destructive. It is destruction that has not been thought through properly." She was concerned that an elected Lords would rival the Commons, risking power-struggles between the two.

In 2019, Boothroyd campaigned with People's Vote for a second referendum following the UK's Brexit vote to leave the European Union (EU) in 2016.

== Personal life and death ==
Boothroyd neither married nor had children. In 2000, she was awarded damages "over newspaper articles that suggested she had been the mistress of the late Lord Walston and had overseen disreputable weekend parties." The articles were written by William Cash for The Daily Express and The Spectator.

Boothroyd took up paragliding while on holiday in Cyprus in her 60s. She described the hobby as both "lovely and peaceful" and "exhilarating". In April 1995, whilst on holiday in Morocco, Boothroyd became trapped in the Atlas Mountains in the country's biggest storm in 20 years. Her vehicle was immobilised by a landslide; she and a group of hikers walked through mud and rubble for nine hours before they were rescued.

She was the sitter in eleven portraits at the National Portrait Gallery. A waxwork of her in full black and gold robes was unveiled at Madame Tussauds wax museum in 1998.

Boothroyd died at Addenbrooke's Hospital in Cambridge on 26 February 2023, at the age of 93. Her death was announced the following day by Lindsay Hoyle, Speaker of the House. After her death, Sandwell's flag at the Council House in Oldbury was lowered as mark of respect for Boothroyd.

Boothroyd's funeral was held on 29 March at St George's Church, Thriplow, Cambridgeshire; she had lived in the village in her later years. Hoyle; the Prime Minister, Rishi Sunak; and Leader of the Opposition, Keir Starmer were among those in attendance, and her close friend, actress Dame Patricia Routledge, sang. A memorial service to Boothroyd was also held at St Margaret's Church, Westminster Abbey, on 16 January 2024, conducted by the Dean of Westminster, David Hoyle.

== Arms ==
Coat of arms of Betty Boothroyd
Notes Granted 8 October 1993 by Conrad Swan, Garter King of Arms. Coronet A Coronet of a Baroness Escutcheon Gules, a representation of the mace of the Speaker of the House of Commons palewise Or surmounted in base by a rose Argent barbed and seeded Proper over all on a fess Gold an owl guardant Proper between two millrinds Sable. Motto I Speak To Serve Orders Order of Merit since 2005. Other elements Atop the lozenge is a green forget-me-not bow or lovers' knot which indicates that she never married. Symbolism The mace is a symbol of Parliament, and thus represents Lady Boothroyd's role as Speaker of the House of Commons. The white rose represents Lady Boothroyd's home county of Yorkshire, while the owl represents her alma mater, Dewsbury Technical College. The millrinds refer to her constituency of West Bromwich because they symbolise the industrial revolution, which is a dominant part of that area's history. Her motto can be explained in her own words: I only speak when I've got something to say, and when I've something to say, I'm trying to serve my country, and to serve the philosophy that I cherish very much. The green bow atop of the crest (forget-me-not bow or lovers' knot) indicates that she has not been married.

== Honorary degrees ==
Boothroyd received at least eight honorary degrees in recognition of her political career, including:

- 6 December 1993: Doctor of Civil Law (DCL) from City, University of London
- 1994: Doctor of Letters (D.Litt.) from the University of Cambridge
- 18 March 1995: Doctor of the University (D.Univ.) from the Open University
- 1995: Doctor of Civil Law (DCL) from the University of Oxford
- 26 June 2003: Doctor of Laws (LL.D.) from the University of St Andrews

Boothroyd was additionally made an Honorary Fellow of Newnham College, Cambridge, in 1994.

At her former school Kirklees College, a building was named the "Boothroyd Building" in her honour. It has since been sold and converted to flats.

== In popular culture ==
In 2022, Boothroyd was featured as the inspiration for a production being planned by a fictional amateur musical theatre group, the Dewsbury Players, in the musical Betty! A Sort of Musical at the Royal Exchange theatre in Manchester. The musical featured Maxine Peake as Boothroyd and a rap battle with Dennis Skinner.

In 2023, Boothroyd was portrayed by Dorothy Atkinson in the television series Stonehouse.

In 2024, the Thriplow Daffodil Weekend honoured Boothroyd by naming a flower "Madam Speaker."

== Publications ==
- Betty Boothroyd: The Autobiography. London: Century. 2001. ISBN 978-0-7126-7948-0.

Parliament of the United Kingdom
Preceded by Maurice Foley	Member of Parliament for West Bromwich; 1973 – February 1974	Constituency abolished
New constituency	Member of Parliament for West Bromwich West; February 1974–2000	Succeeded by Adrian Bailey
Preceded by Sir Paul Dean	Second Deputy Chairman of Ways and Means; 1987–1992	Succeeded by Dame Janet Fookes
Preceded by Bernard Weatherill	Speaker of the House of Commons; 1992–2000	Succeeded by Michael Martin
Academic offices
Preceded by The Lord Briggs	Chancellor of the Open University; 1994–2006	Succeeded by The Lord Puttnam
