= West Bromwich West =

UK Parliament constituency (1974–2024)

Coordinates: 52.53°N 2.05°W

- Former borough constituency for the House of Commons
- Boundary of West Bromwich West in West Midlands

- Location of West Midlands within England
- County: West Midlands
- Electorate: 65,249 (December 2010)
- Major settlements: Tipton and Wednesbury

1974–2024
- Seats: One
- Created from: West Bromwich
- Replaced by: Tipton and Wednesbury

West Bromwich West was a constituency (Note: A borough constituency (for the purposes of election expenses and type of returning officer)) in the West Midlands in the House of Commons of the UK Parliament. It was represented from 1974 until 2019 by members of the Labour Party, (Note: Including Betty Boothroyd, who held the seat as Speaker from 1992 to 2000 with no party affiliation in the Commons, but who remained a member of the Labour Party throughout that period.) and by the Conservatives from 2019 until 2024. (Note: As with all constituencies, the constituency elects one Member of Parliament (MP) by the first past the post system of election at least every five years.)

Further to the completion of the 2023 review of Westminster constituencies, the seat was abolished at the 2024 general election, with most of the seat becoming part of the new Tipton and Wednesbury constituency, with the Oldbury and Tividale wards being transferred to the revived West Bromwich constituency, which is largely the successor to the abolished West Bromwich East.

In exchange the Friar Park and Hateley Heath wards from West Bromwich East, and the Coseley East ward from Wolverhampton South East, were transferred to the new Tipton and Wednesbury.

== Constituency profile ==
Wednesbury and Tipton are economic centres and historic towns with considerable suburbs, although overshadowed in the service sector by nearby Birmingham. Since the early recessions of the 1970s and early 1980s, West Bromwich West has suffered from an acute, persistently high levels of unemployment. During the Great Recession of 2008, unemployment peaked at 14.3%—only the nearby constituency of Birmingham Ladywood had higher unemployment rates in all of Britain.

As of November 2012, unemployed social security claimants who were registered jobseekers were higher than the national average of 3.8%, standing at 8.1% of the local population. Based on a statistical compilation by The Guardian, this also exceeded the regional average of 4.7% of those of working age in receipt of this benefit, which is seen as the lower gauge of the breadth of unemployment.

== Boundaries ==
Map of boundaries 1997-2024

West Bromwich West was one of four constituencies covering the Metropolitan Borough of Sandwell, covering its west and north-west. Its main settlements were the towns of Tipton and Wednesbury, alongside the villages or suburbs of Great Bridge, Princes End and Tividale.

1974–1983: The County Borough of West Bromwich wards of Greets Green, Hill Top, Horseley Heath, Lyng, Market, Tibbington, Tipton Green, and Wood Green.

1983–1997: The Metropolitan Borough of Sandwell wards of Great Bridge, Greets Green and Lyng, Princes End, Tipton Green, Wednesbury North, and Wednesbury South.

1997–2024: The Metropolitan Borough of Sandwell wards of Great Bridge, Oldbury, Princes End, Tipton Green, Tividale, Wednesbury North, and Wednesbury South.

== Political history ==
The seat was held by either the Labour Party or one of its members as the Speaker of the House of Commons from its creation until December 2019.

From 1974 until 2000, this was the constituency of Betty Boothroyd, who was first elected for the former West Bromwich in its by-election in 1973 and became the first woman to be Speaker of the House of Commons in 1992. She retired as Speaker in 2000. (Note: She was elevated to the House of Lords as Baroness Boothroyd of Sandwell.) The ensuing by-election was won by the Labour Co-operative candidate Adrian Bailey, who held the seat until 2019. Shaun Bailey, the Conservative Party candidate in the 2019 general election, took the seat from Labour with a 50.5% vote share on an 11.7% swing. He became the first-ever Conservative member for the constituency.

At local level, Labour held most of the wards of the constituency. From 2008 until 2012, it was followed by the controversial British National Party, which had four councillors, ahead of the Conservatives with three. This came after a fairly strong BNP showing in the 2005 general election, when it received nearly 10% of the vote.

== Members of Parliament ==
Election	Member	Party
Feb 1974	Betty Boothroyd	Labour
1992	Betty Boothroyd	Speaker
2000 by-election	Adrian Bailey	Labour Co-op
2019	Shaun Bailey	Conservative

== Elections ==
=== Elections in the 2010s ===
General election 2019: West Bromwich West
Party	Candidate	Votes	%	±%
Conservative	Shaun Bailey	17,419	50.5	+10.8
Labour	James Cunningham	13,620	39.5	–12.6
Brexit Party	Franco D'Aulerio	1,841	5.3	New
Liberal Democrats	Flo Clucas	915	2.7	+1.8
Green	Keir Williams	664	1.9	+1.0
Majority		3,799	11.0	N/A
Turnout		34,459	53.4	–1.3
Conservative gain from Labour		Swing	+11.7	

General election 2017: West Bromwich West
Party	Candidate	Votes	%	±%
Labour Co-op	Adrian Bailey	18,789	52.1	+4.8
Conservative	Andrew Hardie	14,329	39.7	+15.8
UKIP	Star Anderton	2,320	6.4	–18.8
Liberal Democrats	Flo Clucas	333	0.9	–0.7
Green	Robert Buckman	323	0.9	–1.1
Majority		4,460	12.4	–9.7
Turnout		36,094	54.7	
Labour hold		Swing	–5.6	

General election 2015: West Bromwich West
Party	Candidate	Votes	%	±%
Labour Co-op	Adrian Bailey	16,578	47.3	+2.3
UKIP	Graham Eardley	8,836	25.2	+20.9
Conservative	Paul Ratner	8,365	23.9	–5.4
Green	Mark Redding	697	2.0	New
Liberal Democrats	Karen Trench	550	1.6	–10.4
Majority		7,742	22.1	+5.4
Turnout		35,026		
Labour hold		Swing	–9.3	

General election 2010: West Bromwich West
Party	Candidate	Votes	%	±%
Labour Co-op	Adrian Bailey	16,263	45.0	–8.7
Conservative	Andrew Hardie	10,612	29.3	+6.6
Liberal Democrats	Sadie Smith	4,336	12.0	+1.8
BNP	Russ Green	3,394	9.4	–0.5
UKIP	Malcolm Ford	1,566	4.3	+1.8
Majority		5,651	15.7	–15.9
Turnout		36,171	55.6	+4.0
Labour hold		Swing	–7.6	

=== Elections in the 2000s ===
General election 2005: West Bromwich West
Party	Candidate	Votes	%	±%
Labour Co-op	Adrian Bailey	18,951	54.3	–6.5
Conservative	Mimi Harker	8,057	23.1	–2.0
Liberal Democrats	Martyn Smith	3,583	10.3	+3.5
BNP	James Lloyd	3,456	9.9	+5.4
UKIP	Kevin Walker	870	2.5	+0.9
Majority		10,894	31.2	–4.5
Turnout		34,917	52.3	+4.6
Labour hold		Swing	–2.3	

General election 2001: West Bromwich West
Party	Candidate	Votes	%	±%
Labour Co-op	Adrian Bailey	19,352	60.8	N/A
Conservative	Karen Bissell	7,997	25.1	N/A
Liberal Democrats	Sadie Smith	2,168	6.8	N/A
BNP	John Salvage	1,428	4.5	N/A
UKIP	Kevin Walker	499	1.6	N/A
Socialist Labour	Baghwant Singh	396	1.2	New
Majority		11,355	35.7	N/A
Turnout		31,840	47.7	–6.7
Labour gain from Speaker		Swing		

2000 West Bromwich West by-election
Party	Candidate	Votes	%	±%
Labour Co-op	Adrian Bailey	9,460	50.6	N/A
Conservative	Karen Bissell	6,408	34.3	New
Liberal Democrats	Sadie Smith	1,791	9.6	New
BNP	Nick Griffin	794	4.2	New
UKIP	Jonathan Oakton	246	1.3	New
Majority		3,052	16.3	N/A
Turnout		18,599	27.3	−27.1
Labour gain from Speaker		Swing		

=== Elections in the 1990s ===
General election 1997: West Bromwich West
Party	Candidate	Votes	%	±%
Speaker	Betty Boothroyd^{1}	23,969	65.3	+10.5
Independent Labour	Richard Silvester	8,546	23.3	New
National Democrats	Steven Edwards	4,181	11.4	New
Majority		15,423	42.0	+22.7
Turnout		36,696	54.4	−16.0
Speaker hold		Swing		

^{1}Boothroyd stood as "The Speaker seeking re-election."

General election 1992: West Bromwich West
Party	Candidate	Votes	%	±%
Labour	Betty Boothroyd	22,251	54.8	+4.3
Conservative	Desmond Swayne	14,421	35.5	–1.7
Liberal Democrats	Sarah Broadbent	3,925	9.7	–2.7
Majority		7,830	19.3	+6.0
Turnout		40,597	70.4	+3.4
Labour hold		Swing	+3.0	

=== Elections in the 1980s ===
General election 1987: West Bromwich West
Party	Candidate	Votes	%	±%
Labour	Betty Boothroyd	19,925	50.5	−0.2
Conservative	Francis Betteridge	14,672	37.2	+4.3
SDP	Anthony Collingbourne	4,877	12.4	−4.0
Majority		5,253	13.3	−4.5
Turnout		39,474	67.0	+3.2
Labour hold		Swing	-2.2	

General election 1983: West Bromwich West
Party	Candidate	Votes	%	±%
Labour	Betty Boothroyd	18,896	50.7	−9.6
Conservative	David Harman	12,257	32.9	−3.4
SDP	Anthony Collingbourne	6,094	16.4	New
Majority		6,639	17.8	−6.2
Turnout		37,247	63.8	−3.3
Labour hold		Swing	-3.1	

=== Elections in the 1970s ===
General election 1979: West Bromwich West
Party	Candidate	Votes	%	±%
Labour	Betty Boothroyd	23,791	60.3	−1.9
Conservative	D Harrison	14,323	36.3	+13.5
National Front	R Churms	1,351	3.4	−2.0
Majority		9,468	24.0	−15.4
Turnout		39,465	67.1	+4.3
Labour hold		Swing	-7.7	

General election October 1974: West Bromwich West
Party	Candidate	Votes	%	±%
Labour	Betty Boothroyd	23,336	62.2	−0.7
Conservative	N Bridges-Adams	8,537	22.8	−6.5
Liberal	DJ Corney	3,619	9.7	New
National Front	R Churms	2,022	5.4	−2.4
Majority		14,799	39.4	+5.8
Turnout		37,514	62.8	−4.7
Labour hold		Swing	+2.9	

General election February 1974: West Bromwich West
Party	Candidate	Votes	%	±%
Labour	Betty Boothroyd	25,112	62.9	
Conservative	PM Smith	11,681	29.3	
National Front	G Bowen	3,107	7.8	
Majority		13,431	33.6	
Turnout		39,900	67.5	
Labour win (new seat)				

== See also ==
- Parliamentary constituencies in the West Midlands (county)

== Notes ==
Parliament of the United Kingdom
Preceded by Croydon North East	Constituency represented by the speaker 1992–2000	Succeeded by Glasgow Springburn
