= List of people educated at the Royal High School, Edinburgh =

The following is a list of notable former pupils of the Royal High School of Edinburgh, Scotland.

Anthropology

- Daniel Wilson (1816–1892), anthropologist and university administrator
- Brian Lang (born 1945), anthropologist and university administrator

Architecture

- Robert Adam (1728–1792), architect to George III
- Robert Mylne (1733–1811), architect and engineer
- Thomas Hamilton (1784–1858), architect
- William Burn (1789–1870), architect
- David Bryce (1803–1876), architect
- James Fergusson (1808–1886), architectural historian
- George Henderson (1846–1905), architect

Asian studies

- Arthur Keith (1879–1944), Sanskritist and jurist
- H. A. R. Gibb (1895–1971), Arabic scholar

Chemistry

- James Keir (1735–1820), chemist and industrialist
- Thomas Hope (1766–1844), chemist and educationist
- James Syme (1799–1870), discoverer of the solvent for rubber
- George Wilson (1818–1859), chemist and museum director
- Alexander Crum Brown (1838–1922), chemist

Commerce and industry

- Thomas Coutts (1735–1822), London merchant banker
- William Forbes (1739–1806), banker and philanthropist
- James Matheson (1796–1878), Hong Kong merchant and politician
- David Yule (1858–1928), Calcutta merchant and industrialist, 'Empire's Richest Man'
- Malcolm Stewart (1872–1951), brick and cement manufacturer
- William Denholm Barnetson, Baron Barnetson (1917–1981), Chairman of United Newspapers, Reuters and Thames Television
- Gerry Forsgate (1919–2001), Hong Kong transport entrepreneur
- Fraser Doherty (born 1988), entrepreneur

Classical studies

- John Burnet (1863–1928), Ancient Greek scholar

Earth sciences

- Robert Sibbald (1641–1722), physician and geographer
- James Hutton (1726–1797), geologist
- Alexander Rose (1781–1860), geologist
- John Bartholomew (1860–1920), cartographer and geographer
- Charles Normand (1889–1982), meteorologist

Economics

- John Kay (born 1948), economist

Education

- John Watson (died 1762), benefactor of John Watson's School
- William Fettes (1750–1836), Lord Provost of Edinburgh and benefactor of Fettes College
- James Pillans (1778–1864), educational reformer and classical scholar, inventor of the blackboard
- Leonard Horner (1785–1864), geologist, a founder of the Edinburgh Academy and University College School
- Walter Scott Dalgleish (1834–1897), writer

Engineering and design

- James Short (1710–1768), maker of optical instruments
- James Nasmyth (1808–1890), inventor of the steam hammer
- Thomas Stevenson (1818–1887), lighthouse designer
- James Balfour (1831–1869), New Zealand marine engineer
- Alexander Graham Bell (1847–1922), inventor of the telephone

Entertainment

- William Chippendale (1801–1888), actor
- Charles Cameron (1927–2001), magician
- Ronnie Corbett (1930–2016), comedian
- David Robb (born 1947), actor
- Ian Charleson (1949–1990), actor
- Glenn Chandler (born 1949), creator of TV series Taggart
- Eleanor Morton, comedian

Games and sport

- John Boak (1837–1876), cricketer
- John Russel (1849–1902), cricketer
- Alexander Laing (born 1865), rugby union player
- David Addison-Smith (1873–1937), cricketer
- Edward Wilson (1907–1982), cricketer and badminton player
- Dougie Lawrence (1929–2000), cricketer and cricket administrator
- Jim Roberts (1933–2021), cricketer
- David Fraser (born 1943), cricketer
- Colin Telfer (born 1947), rugby union player
- Ronnie Wood (born 1960), ice hockey player
- Iwan Tukalo (born 1961), rugby union player
- Ben Cairns (born 1985), rugby union player
- Alan MacDonald (born 1985), rugby union player
- Alistair McCann (born 1999), footballer

History and archaeology

- William Erskine (1773–1852), historian of India
- Patrick Tytler (1791–1849), historian of Scotland
- Cosmo Innes (1798–1874), antiquary of Scotland
- William Skene (1809–1892), historian and Celtic scholar
- Alexander Murray (1841–1904), museum curator
- Gordon Donaldson (1913–1993), historian of Scotland

Law

- Thomas Craig (c. 1538 – 1608), lawyer, jurist and poet
- John Bonar (1747–1807), lawyer
- Henry, Lord Cockburn (1779–1854), lawyer, Senator of the College of Justice, author, and a founder of the Edinburgh Academy
- James Craig (1765–1850), lawyer and politician
- Mark Napier (1798–1879), lawyer and historian
- John Inglis, Lord Glencorse (1810–1891), Lord President of the Court of Session
- Theodore Martin (1816–1909), lawyer and biographer

Literature

- William Drummond (1585–1649), poet and pamphleteer
- William Strahan (1715–1785), printer
- William Smellie (1740–1795), encyclopaedist
- Henry Mackenzie (1745–1831), writer
- Robert Fergusson (1750–1774), poet
- Walter Scott (1771–1832), poet and novelist
- Francis Jeffrey (1773–1850), writer and judge
- Adam Black (1784–1874), publisher, Lord Provost of Edinburgh and Liberal backbencher
- George Borrow (1803–1881), writer and traveller
- Robert Garioch (1909–1981), poet and translator
- Norman MacCaig (1910–1996), poet
- Karl Miller (1931–2014), literary critic

Medicine

- James Wardrop (1782–1869), surgeon to King George IV
- Robert Knox (1791–1862), anatomist and ethnologist
- Robert Christison (1797–1882), toxicologist
- Andrew Combe (1797–1882), honorary physician to Queen Victoria and the King of the Belgians
- Charles Morehead (1807–1882), physician
- Douglas Maclagan (1812–1900), surgeon
- James Spence (1812–1882), surgeon
- Caleb Saleeby (1878–1940), public health advocate

Music

- Thomas Erskine, Lord Kellie (1731–1781), composer
- Al Fairweather (1927–1993), jazz trumpeter
- Sandy Brown (1929–1975), bandleader and acoustic architect
- Frankie Poullain (born 1967), bassist for the band The Darkness

Philosophy

- Dugald Stewart (1753–1838), philosopher
- James Ferrier (1808–1864), philosopher
- Henry Calderwood (1830–1897), philosopher
- Andrew Seth Pringle-Pattison (1856–1931), philosopher
- W. D. Ross (1877–1971), philosopher

Politics

- George Drummond (1687–1766), Lord Provost of Edinburgh and civic improver
- Alexander Wedderburn, Lord Rosslyn (1733–1805), Whig lord chancellor and defender of Clive of India
- William Brodie (1741–1788), deacon and thief
- Henry Dundas, Lord Melville (1742–1811), Tory politician and political manager
- Thomas Erskine, Lord Erskine (1750–1823), Whig lord chancellor
- Robert Dundas, Lord Melville (1771–1851), Tory First Lord of the Admiralty
- James Abercromby, Lord Dunfermline (1776–1858), Whig Speaker of the House of Commons
- Francis Horner (1778–1817), Whig backbencher
- Henry Brougham, 1st Baron Brougham and Vaux (1778–1868), Whig Lord Chancellor
- George Clerk (1787–1867), Tory Vice-president of the Board of Trade
- William Craig (1797–1878), Liberal Lord of the Treasury, Lord Clerk Register and keeper of the Signet
- James Robertson (1845–1909), Unionist politician and Lord President of the Court of Session
- Douglas Henderson (1935–2006), SNP deputy leader
- Chris Harvie (born 1943), SNP MSP backbencher
- Robin Cook (1946–2005), Labour Foreign Secretary and Lord President of the Council
- Ian Blackford (born 1961), SNP leader in the House of Commons
- Sarah Boyack (born 1961), Labour MSP, former Transport Minister
- Kenneth Macintosh (born 1962), Labour MSP, Presiding Officer of the Scottish Parliament

Public service

- Cadwallader Colden (1688–1776), Lieutenant Governor of New York
- John Campbell (1753–1784), soldier
- Lachlan Macquarie (1761–1824), army officer and colonial governor
- Adam Ferguson (1770–1854), army officer and Deputy Keeper of The Scottish Regalia
- George Ramsay, Lord Dalhousie (1770–1838), army officer, Governor General of British North America, Commander-in-Chief in India
- George Murray (1772–1846), army officer, Lieutenant-Governor of Upper Canada, Secretary of State for War and the Colonies
- Alexis Greig (1775–1845), naval officer in the Russian service
- Frederick Maitland (1777–1839), naval officer, received the surrender of Napoleon
- Mountstuart Elphinstone (1779–1859), Governor of Bombay
- Charles Napier (1786–1860), naval officer and politician
- George Hay, Lord Tweeddale (1787–1876), army officer and Governor of Madras
- Thomas Campbell Robertson (1789–1863), colonial administrator in India, Lieutenant-Governor of the North-Western Provinces
- William Keith (1873–1937), colonial administrator in Burma
- Eric "Winkle" Brown (1919–2016), Royal Navy officer, world record holder for most aircraft carrier landings

Religion

- Robert Haldane (1764–1842), theologian
- John Campbell (1766–1840), Congregational minister and missionary in Africa
- James Haldane (1768–1851), Baptist church leader
- David Welsh (1793–1845), Free Church of Scotland minister and author
- Archibald Tait (1811–1882), Archbishop of Canterbury
- William Dalrymple Maclagan (1826–1910), Archbishop of York
- James Stewart (1831–1905), Church of Scotland missionary to Africa
- Alexander Gordon (1841–1931), Unitarian minister and historian
- George Smith (1856–1942), theologian

Visual arts

- Alexander Nasmyth (1758–1840), artist and engineer
- George Heriot (1759–1839), painter and deputy Postmaster General for British North America
- William Allan (1782–1850), painter and President of the Royal Scottish Academy
- Robert Lauder (1803–1869), painter and art teacher
- David Scott (1806–1849), painter and poet
- William Marshall (1813–1894), sculptor
- James Archer (1822–1904), painter
- William Douglas (1822–1891), painter, antiquary, and curator

Zoology

- William Baird (1803–1872), zoologist
- Graham Kerr (1869–1957), zoologist
- Landsborough Thomson (1890–1977), ornithologist

Although the Royal High School long enjoyed a near monopoly on boys' education among the Edinburgh burgesses and county gentry, roll lists before the mid eighteenth century are incomplete. Consequently, attendance by the mathematician John Napier (1550–1617) and the philosopher David Hume (1711–1776) is unconfirmed and may be legend.

On occasion the school has also provided a literally royal education. In 1859 The Prince of Wales received lessons in Roman history from the Rector, Dr. Leonhard Schmitz, and presented the Carson medal at the prize-giving. The following year, 1860, Prince Ferdinand d'Orléans, duke of Alençon (1844–1910), Louis d'Orléans, prince of Condé (1845–1866), and Prince Pierre d'Orléans, duke of Penthièvre (1845–1919), attended classes and were awarded prizes.

== Military and civil honours ==
First World War

Schoolfellows who gave their lives for their country are commemorated by the memorial porch and brass tablets in the school hall. The upper architrave of the marble Doric portico is inscribed with a phrase from Simonides: ΟΥΔΕ ΤΕΘΝΑΣΙ ΘΑΝΟΝΤΕΣ. They died but are not dead.

A memorial field was laid out at Jock's Lodge in 1919, where a grand pavilion was presented to the school by the Education Authority and opened by Prince Henry in 1925. The perimeter was planted with commemorative trees and a stand was erected by public subscription. The memorial gates, opened in 1950, bear copper shields emblematic of the fighting services. Their vine motif is the Christian symbol of life. Set above is the word Meminerimus (Let us remember), taken from the school song.

The Roll of Honour 1914–1918 contains 1024 names. The number of those who fell is 180. Former pupils received many decorations and awards, among them:

- Two VCs
- Two CBs
- One KCSI
- One KCMG
- One CMG
- Two CIEs
- One KCVO
- One CBE
- 16 DSOs
- Six OBEs
- Three OBEs (Military Division)
- Two DSCs
- 47 MCs
- One AFC
- One KGStJ
- One AStJ
- Seven DCMs
- Five CGMs
- 20 MMs
- One DFM
- Three MSMs
- One LSM
- Eleven TDs
- 91 mentions in despatches
- One mention in 'B' list of despatches
- One Certificate of Commendation from Admiralty
- One Silver Medal from Lloyd's
- One Order of Leopold (Belgium)
- Four Croix de guerre (Belgium)
- One Order of St. Vladimir with Crossed Swords (Russia)
- One Order of St. George, 4th Class (Russia)
- One Croix de Chevalier of the Order of the Redeemer (France)
- One Croix de Guerre with Star (France)
- Two Croix de guerre with Palm (France)
- Two Croix de Guerre (France)
- One Médaille de la Victoire (France)
- One Médaille Commémorative (France)
- One Médaille de la Reconnaissance, 3rd Class (France)
- One Medal of Military Merit (Greece)
- One Order of the Crown of Italy
- One King of Italy's Medal
- One Order of the White Eagle (Serbia)
- Two Order of St. Sava (Serbia)
- Two Order of St. Sava, 5th Class (Serbia)
- One Knight Commander of the North Star of Sweden

The VC recipients were Philip Bent and Harcus Strachan.

Second World War

In 1949 memorial windows in the school hall were dedicated to the dead of the Second World War. Made with stained glass, they were the work of former pupils William Wilson and William G. Dey. Their theme is Scottish heritage. The west window is called the Heroes Window. It carries the school crest and military insignia of former pupils, and features famous warriors. The centre window is called the Royal Window. It depicts royal patrons of the school and symbols of constitutional and technological evolution. Beneath the arms of Scotland is Barbour's line: 'Fredom is ane nobil thing'. The east window is called the Thinkers Window. It displays the city arms and portrays poets and visionaries of Scotland. The lower corner panels of each window show a child training to maintain the national inheritance.

The Roll of Honour 1939–1945 contains 1243 names. The number of those who fell is 131. The following are among the decorations and awards:

- One VC
- One GC
- One CIE
- Two CBEs
- Four DSOs
- Five OBEs
- 18 MBEs
- Two DSCs
- Ten MCs
- 14 DFCs
- Three AFCs
- Two DCMs
- One CGM
- Three GMs
- Two MMs
- Three DFMs
- One BEM
- Eight TDs
- Five TEMs
- One RD
- One AE
- 74 mentions in despatches
- One Lloyds' War Medal for Bravery
- One Croix de guerre (Belgium)
- One Knight of the Order of the Dannebrog (Denmark)
- One Order of Ismail (4th Class) (Egypt)
- One Croix de Lorraine (France)
- One Knight of the Order of Orange Nassau with Swords
- One King Haakon VII Birthday Medal Ribbon

The VC recipient is John Cruickshank. The GC recipient (posthumous) was Douglas Ford.
