= The Donald Dewar Memorial Debating Tournament =

Debating competition in Scotland

The Donald Dewar Memorial Debating Tournament is a national debating competition held throughout the year in Scottish Secondary Schools. It is one of the leading debating tournaments in Scotland and is organised annually by the Law Society of Scotland. It was created in 1999 to mark the Law Society of Scotland's 50th anniversary. It was later renamed in order to remember the life, work and passion of Donald Dewar, the first First Minister of Scotland. Since 2006, the final of the tournament has often been held in the debating chamber of The Scottish Parliament, in Edinburgh. In 2015, Jamie MacLeod and Ewan Redpath won the competition for Madras College. The 2016 competition had 128 teams participating, with winners Finlay Allmond and Caitlin Sherret from Nairn Academy. Charlie Holder and Fraser Cordiner went on to pick up a second win for Nairn in 2025, debating "This house would rather get an education in the year 2000 rather than 2025" Craigmount High School have won the competition a record three times- in 2007 2012, and 2014. Madras College, Glasgow Academy, Peebles High School, and Robert Gordon's College are the only other schools to have won the competition more than once.

== Format of The Competition ==
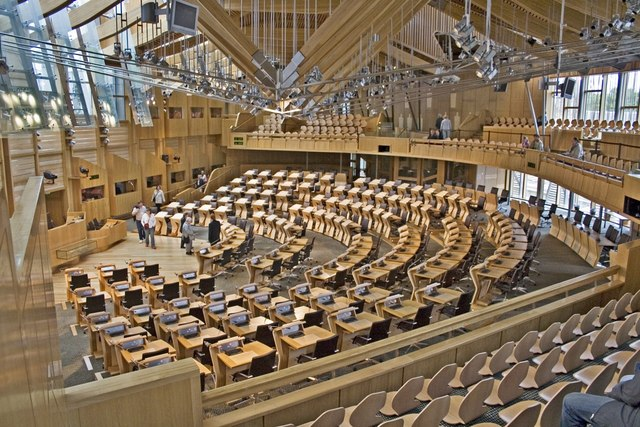
The debating chamber of the Scottish Parliament, the venue of the finals since 2006 (with exception of 2023 and the pandemic years)

The competition has four stages of debate. These take place throughout Scottish Secondary Schools from November to June, with the final being held in the Scottish Parliament.

Round	Format	Venues
1	Teams are given two weeks to prepare	Host Secondary School
2	Teams are given two weeks to prepare	Host Secondary School
Semi-Finals	Teams are given one hour to prepare	Host Secondary School
Final	Teams are given three weeks to prepare	Scottish Parliament

In 2023, the motion for the competition's final was subject to a late change, due to the fact that there was a death in the local community that was thought to be related to TikTok. This lead the Law Society of Scotland to change the motion from, "This House would ban TikTok", to "This House would support government intervention to prevent gentrification". Additionally, there was a change in the format of the semi-final debates due to heavy snow, meaning that some of the heats had to be moved online.

== Winners ==
Year	Winning school	Speakers	Runners-up	Speakers
2025	Nairn Academy	Charlie Holder, Fraser Cordiner		
2024	Broxburn Academy	Finlay Sayers, Sarah Pym	Balfron High School	Harry Braid, Jasper Burnside
2023	Broxburn Academy	Emma Bell, Ruby Ferguson	Balfron High School	Harry Braid, Jasper Burnside
2022	Fortrose Academy		The High School of Glasgow	
2021	Peebles High School		Thurso High School	
2020	Peebles High School		Balfron High School	
2019	Bearsden Academy		Balfron High School	
2018	Peebles High School	Helen Whalley, Mhairi Sinclair	Perth High School	
2017	Douglas Academy		High School of Dundee	
2016	Nairn Academy	Finlay Allmond, Caitlin Sherret		
2015	Madras College	Jamie Macleod, Ewan Redpath	Preswick Academy	
2014	Craigmount High School	Liam Stewart, Michael Davidson	Douglas Academy	Rosie Duthie, Amitai Gottleib
2013	Robert Gordon's College		Glenalmond College	
2012	Craigmount High School	Cameron Craig		
2011	Braes High School			
2010	Glasgow Academy	Séamus Macdonald McGuigan, Oscar Lee		
2009	Glasgow Academy	Allen Farrington, Cosmo Grant		
2008	Robert Gordon's College	Joanna Farmer, Michael Sim	High School of Dundee	
2007	Craigmount High School		High School of Dundee	
2006	Dollar Academy		Hutcheson's Grammar School	
2005	George Heriot's School		Robert Gordon's College	
