= 1978 Glasgow Garscadden by-election =

UK by-election

- 13 April 1978

Glasgow Garscadden constituency
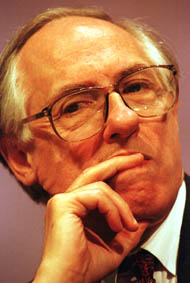
	First party	Second party	Third party
		SNP	Con
Candidate	Donald Dewar	Keith Bovey	Iain Lawson
Party	Labour	SNP	Conservative
Popular vote	16,507	11,955	6,746
Percentage	45.4%	32.9%	18.5%
Swing	▼5.5%	▲1.7%	▲5.6%
MP before election
William Small
Labour
Elected MP
Donald Dewar
Labour

The 1978 Glasgow Garscadden by-election was a parliamentary by-election held on 13 April 1978 for the UK House of Commons constituency of Glasgow Garscadden, in the north-west periphery of Glasgow.

The contest was won by Donald Dewar, retaining the seat for Labour, widely seen as halting the rise of the Scottish National Party in the 1970s.

== Previous Member of Parliament ==
The by-election was caused by the death of William Watson Small (1909-78) of the Labour Party.

Small was an engineer. He was an Ayrshire County Councillor from 1945-51 and an active member of the Amalgamated Engineering Union, serving on its national committee from 1955-57 and as president of the union's West Ayrshire district.

At the 1959 general election, he was elected as the MP for Glasgow Scotstoun. At the February 1974 general election he was elected for Glasgow Garscadden which was largely the same constituency; albeit with a different name. Small retained that seat until his death.

Small never held ministerial office, but served as Parliamentary Private Secretary to the Minister of Power from 1964.

== Candidates ==
Six candidates were nominated for the by-election.

The Labour Party candidate was Donald Campbell Dewar. He had worked as a solicitor in Glasgow before being elected to Parliament aged 28 at the 1966 general election to represent the marginal constituency of Aberdeen South. In his maiden speech in Parliament, Dewar railed against a proposed increase on potato tax. This was his first notable success - the tax was subsequently repealed in 1967. That same year he was made Parliamentary Private Secretary to the Education Secretary Anthony Crosland, who Dewar later confessed to never really establishing a rapport with. He held that position until 1969. In April 1968, Dewar was proposed for a Minister of State position by Roy Jenkins but nothing came of it. He lost his seat to Iain Sproat at the 1970 general election.

Dewar later went on to become Secretary of State for Scotland, and the inaugural holder of the position of First Minister of Scotland in 1999.

Representing the Scottish National Party, was Keith S. Bovey. He had previously unsuccessfully contested the neighbouring seat of Glasgow Hillhead in February 1974 and Glasgow Garscadden at the October 1974 general election. In that contest, the SNP overtook the Conservative Party as the main challenge to Labour at Glasgow Garscadden. Bovey was also a senior figure in the CND.

Bovey went on to contest Glasgow Hillhead in 1983, as well as Monklands West at the 1987 and 1992 UK general elections.

The Conservative nominee was Iain M. Lawson. He contested Dumbarton for the Conservatives in 1983. Later he was the SNP candidate for Stirling in 1987 and for Paisley South in the 1990 Paisley South by-election and the 1992 general election.

Mrs. Shiona Farrell represented the Scottish Labour Party, which was a short-lived breakaway group from the Labour Party. She did not contest any other parliamentary election.

Sammy Barr was the Communist candidate. He contested Glasgow Garscadden in February 1974, and later at the 1979 and 1983 UK general elections.

The Socialist Workers Party stood Peter Porteous, who did not contest any other parliamentary election.

== Previous result ==
General election October 1974: Glasgow Garscadden
Party	Candidate	Votes	%	±%
Labour	William Small	19,737	50.9	−1.4
SNP	Keith Sydney Bovey	12,100	31.2	+9.3
Conservative	John Corbett	5,004	12.9	−9.4
Liberal	Michael Royston Kibby	1,915	5.0	New
Majority		7,637	19.7	−8.3
Turnout		38,756	70.9	−3.2
Labour hold		Swing		
Registered electors		54,700		

- Death of William Small 18 January 1978

== Result ==
By-election 13 April 1978: Glasgow Garscadden
Party	Candidate	Votes	%	±%
Labour	Donald Dewar	16,507	45.4	−5.5
SNP	Keith Sydney Bovey	11,955	32.9	+1.7
Conservative	Ian Macdonald Lawson	6,746	18.5	+5.6
SLP	Shiona Farrell	583	1.6	New
Communist	Sammy Barr	407	1.1	New
Socialist Workers	Peter Porteous	166	0.5	New
Majority		4,552	12.5	−7.2
Turnout		36,364	69.1	−1.8
Labour hold		Swing		
Registered electors		57,603		

== Political context ==
The by-election was important as it was the first Westminster by-election in Scotland to take place since the October 1974 general election, a lengthy gap. The SNP was widely seen as being on a rise, doing well at the 1977 district council elections.

Although the by-election saw a significant swing from Labour to SNP, because the SNP failed to take the seat it was seen as a defeat for them. Labour did even better, and the SNP worse, shortly after this, in the 1978 regional elections, and Westminster by-elections in Hamilton and Berwick and East Lothian.

== See also ==
- Glasgow Garscadden constituency
- List of United Kingdom by-elections (1950–1979)
