= Craigmount High School =

Coordinates: 55°56′42.34″N 3°18′16.51″W

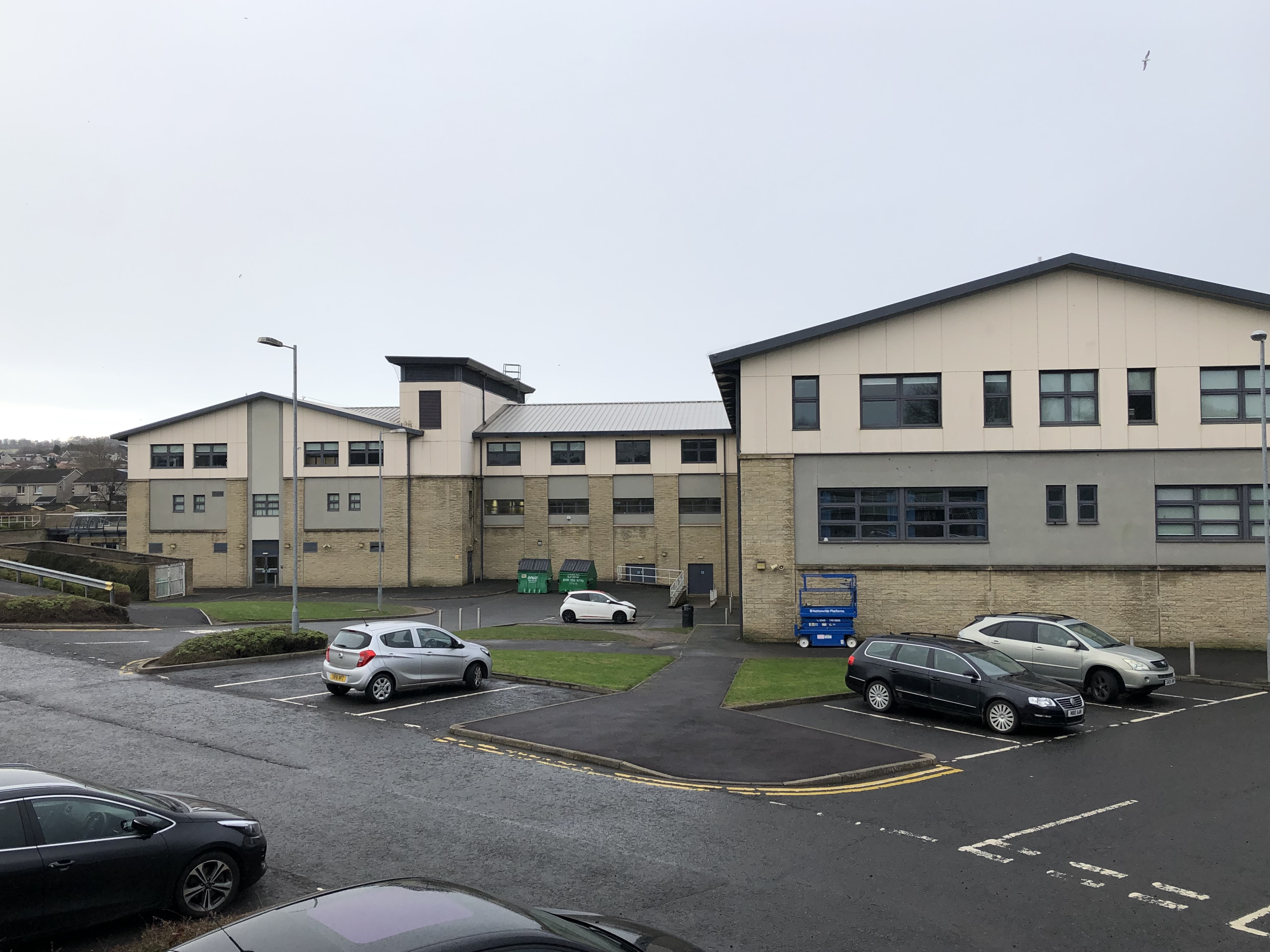

Location
- Craigs Road; Edinburgh, EH12 8NH; Scotland

Information
- Motto: "Trust, Purpose, Aspiration, Awareness, Drive"
- Established: 1970
- Local authority: City of Edinburgh Council
- Enrollment: ~1,350 Pupils
- Website: http://www.craigmount.edin.sch.uk/

Craigmount High School is a non-denominational secondary school in Edinburgh, Scotland with approximately 1,350 pupils located in the west of Edinburgh, Scotland. It is situated between Corstorphine, East Craigs and Drumbrae and it moved into new premises at the beginning of the 2003 academic year. In April 2016, the new building was closed down by Edinburgh Council due to safety concerns; measures were put in place to continue classes in other premises. The new building reopened as of August 2016 when the building met the minimum safety standards.

== History ==
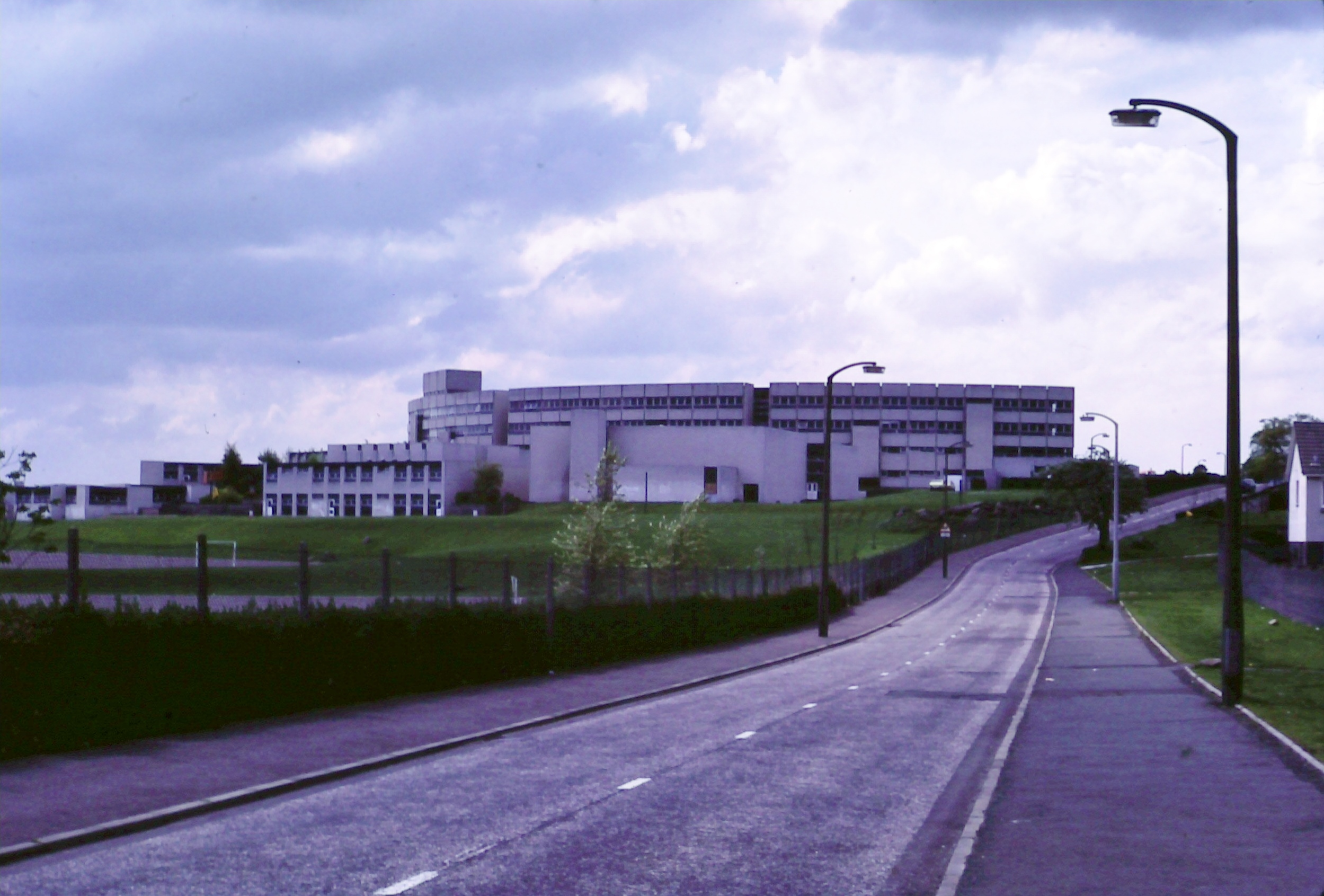
The first school photographed in 1981

The first school premises were built in 1970 on the site of a farm to provide accommodation for increasing numbers of pupils from new housing developments.

When the Scotland Japanese School (スコットランド日本語補習授業校 Sukottorando Nihongo Hoshū Jugyō Kō), a weekend Japanese school, opened in 1982, classes were originally held at Craigmount High School. The school classes were moved to Livingston in April 2003.

Craigmount's debating teams won the Donald Dewar Debating Tournament several times in the early 2010s.

Craigmount’s team were finalists in the 2020 Future Asset Competition

== New building ==
By the late-1990s the school was catering for more pupils than it was designed for, and the low-quality fabric of the building was deteriorating. In 2003, work began on the new building under a PPP (Public-Private Partnership) scheme which involved selling the existing building and the upper sports pitches to a property developer. The new building was built on the site of the old playing fields. Work was completed on schedule, and staff and pupils moved into the school in August 2003.

In April 2016 the school building was closed by Edinburgh City Council as building work carried out under a Public-Private Partnership had been classed as unsafe. School classes were subsequently moved to several other premises across Edinburgh. Seventeen other schools in the Edinburgh area were similarly affected. Classes eventually resumed in the building at the start of the 2016/2017 academic year.

== Headteachers ==
- Colin Meikle (2020–present)
- Tony O 'Doherty [Acting] (2020)
- Tom Rae - (2015–2020)
- Dr John J. Campbell - (2006–2014)
- John Fraser - (1999-2005)
- Andrew Bruce - (1993–1999)
- William Trotter - (1970–1993)

== Notable alumni ==
- David Addison-Smith – cricketer
- Tasmina Ahmed-Sheikh – politician
- Tam Dean Burn – Scottish actor
- Elizabeth Burns – poet
- Colin Keir – MSP for Edinburgh Western 2011-2016
- Gordon Marshall – professional footballer, played for Falkirk, Celtic, Kilmarnock and Motherwell
- Scott Marshall – professional footballer, played for Arsenal, Southampton and Brentford
- Brad McKay – professional footballer, currently playing for Brechin City
- Peter Murrell – Convicted criminal (embezzlement) and former chief executive of the SNP
- Michael Stewart – professional footballer, played for Manchester United, Hearts, Hibernian and Charlton Athletic
- Louise Welsh – writer, novels include The Cutting Room and The Bullet Trick
