= Sir James Hutchison, 1st Baronet =

British army officer, company director and politician

Sir James Riley Holt Hutchison, 1st Baronet, DSO, TD, JP (10 April 1893 – 24 February 1979) was a British army officer, company director and politician. He was the son of a Scottish shipowner and spent his commercial life in the same field and as a director of shipbuilders, but fought in both World Wars during a long military career. He distinguished himself as the principal British liaison officer with the French Resistance during the Second World War in which he needed plastic surgery to disguise his appearance from the Germans; he was nicknamed the "Pimpernel of the Maquis". At the end of the Second World War he was elected as a Unionist Member of Parliament in Glasgow, and although the city was turning against his party he enjoyed a 14-year Parliamentary career.

== First World War service ==
Hutchison's father, Thomas Holt Hutchison (1861-1918), was a shipowner and Glasgow magistrate who had a love of the sea and the shipping business; he was to pass on the same attitudes to his son. He was sent to Stanmore Park Preparatory School followed by Harrow School for his education, followed by some study in France, before joining the family firm at the age of 19 in 1912. He was still learning the trade when the outbreak of the First World War led him to obtain a commission in the Lanarkshire Yeomanry. Hutchison was later attached to the 19th Lancers (Fane's Horse) in France and in 1917 to the 17th Cavalry of the Indian Army in India, and served throughout the war. Hutchison kept up his connections with the Lanarkshire Yeomanry and three decades later was appointed as the regiment's honorary colonel.

== Business life ==
On his return from the war, Hutchison resumed business life, where he rose to senior management positions. He was the representative of Glasgow to the Chamber of Shipping from 1933 to 1935, and became chairman of the Ailsa Shipbuilding Company, Hutchison and Craft Ltd, and Grampian Holdings, and also a Director of the Tayside Floorcloth Company Ltd. He was also an insurance broker. In 1928 Hutchison married Winefryde Craft, who bore him a son and a daughter (who predeceased her father).

== Second World War ==
Although he was in his late 40s, Hutchison enlisted again at the start of the Second World War. In the early part of the war he served in France and North Africa, before joining the Staff. There he was appointed as the principal link between the British forces and the French section of the Special Operations Executive, the secretive and daring body who undertook sabotage operations behind enemy lines.

== French resistance ==
Despite turning 50, Hutchison was instructed to go to France to continue liaison work with the French Resistance after the Normandy landings. However, the face of 'Colonel Hutchison' was well known to the Gestapo, who shot saboteurs after capture. He therefore went to London plastic surgeons to have his appearance disguised before going to France. When the surgery was complete, he was dropped by parachute in Normandy and resumed his work. So effective was Hutchison that he was nicknamed the "Pimpernel of the Maquis"; he was not captured during four months in France, and at the end of the war he received the Distinguished Service Order from the British. The French awarded him the Croix de Guerre and made him a Chevalier of the Légion d'honneur. He published in 1977 his war adventures: That Drug Danger (in 1978 reprinted as Danger Has No Face).

== MP for Glasgow ==
Immediately on leaving the Army, Hutchison pitched into the political world as Conservative candidate in Glasgow Central. The previous election had seen a relatively narrow Conservative majority of 3,521, and was regarded as close enough to be a test of opinion among the Glasgow business community. Conservative Party leader Winston Churchill (who was somewhat late arriving) addressed a mass meeting at Blythswood Square in the division and received a warm reception from a large crowd. In the circumstances of the election (where the Conservatives lost 180 seats), Hutchison did well to win by 1,516 although the swing in Glasgow was much less than elsewhere.

Without delay Hutchison made his maiden speech in the debate on the King's Speech, lauding the United Kingdom for leading the progress of the peoples of the world along the road of social improvement, and calling for a minimum wage and maximum working day to be imposed on the defeated nations. In the crunch vote in December 1945 on whether to accept the Anglo-American loan, Hutchison abstained, explaining in a letter to The Times that the legislation was "disgracefully rushed" and there was too little time for examination and debate.

== Attitude to nationalisation ==
Hutchison was concerned by the Government's Civil Aviation Bill, particularly in its effect on Prestwick Airport which he feared would be "[chucked] overboard". In July 1946 Hutchison reminded Prime Minister Clement Attlee that there were hundreds of ex-officers who had trained with the resistance movements, and suggested using some to help defeat terrorism in Palestine by both Arabs and Jews. He was an instinctive opponent of nationalisation, particularly of the electricity generation industry which he regarded as efficient and prudent.

== Industry ==
When the Government announced the end of the British mandate in Palestine, Hutchison thought the territory would be dynamite, and foresaw an impossible position with a Jewish police in Tel Aviv and an Arab police force in Jaffa. He was an active opponent of the nationalisation of Iron and Steel, serving on the Standing Committee examining the Iron and Steel Bill where he unsuccessfully pressed for a requirement that one member of the corporation running the industry should be from Scotland and one from Wales.

Hutchison had concentrated on industrial matters during his time in Parliament, opposing regulations which restricted business freedom on matters such as price control. He insisted that these Orders were "full of vice" and questioned their legality. He had continued his business career and was National President of the Incorporated Sales Managers' Association from 1949. His shipbuilding connections led to an appointment as Parliamentary chairman of the Dock and Harbour Authorities Association, which was regarded as a successful choice. Hutchison was well-enough known to be referenced in Soviet propaganda of the time, being given as one of four examples of the "industrial magnates, landowning aristocrats, dealers and professional politicians" making up the Conservative Party in an article in Trud.

== Defeat and quick return ==
At the 1950 general election, Hutchison found his undersized constituency expanded to the east, taking in mostly Labour voters, but he was thought to be in much more difficulty from the abolition of the vote for business premises. Hutchison ended up losing by 3,004 votes.

In August 1950, Sir Arthur Young, Unionist MP for the Scotstoun division in the north-west of Glasgow, died. Hutchison was selected to follow him in defending a majority of 239. After a close contest, Hutchison held the seat with an increased majority of 1,319. He pitched back into partisan debate, arguing at the 1951 budget that the Government would not have had to increase income tax if it had been able to collect all the taxes which were due. He later insisted that enterprise and commercial courage were threatened by the budget.

== War Office ==
Although his majority was reduced to 625 in the 1951 general election, Hutchison was appointed as Financial Secretary and Under-Secretary of State to the War Office. With his post he was ex-officio Vice-Chairman of the Army Council and he occasionally deputised for the Secretary of State by attending Cabinet. Hutchison supported the controversial move to German rearmament in 1952, arguing that Germany should bear some of the burden of providing her own defence.

In 1953 Hutchison initiated a reorganisation of British Anti-Aircraft Command, which reduced the number of heavy anti-aircraft units, and transferred some Territorial Army anti-aircraft units to the field force. He left office in October 1954, succeeded by fellow Scottish military officer Fitzroy Maclean. After his return to the backbenches, Hutchison resumed making partisan speeches; in December 1954 he attacked Labour MPs for politicising military subjects in order to seek political kudos. In March 1955, after a report about the activities of some British Communists in Korea, he urged their prosecution for treason.

== Death penalty ==
After a narrow re-election in the 1955 general election in which he had a majority of 428, Hutchison became President of the UK Council of the European Movement. He opposed agitation for equal pay for women in November 1955, arguing that "they might work themselves completely out of jobs". In early 1956 he tabled a motion to retain the death penalty for murderers of police officers.

== Cold war incidents ==
In the New Years' Honours list of 1956, Hutchison was awarded a baronetcy. When diver Commander "Buster" Crabb disappeared near the ship carrying Nikita Khrushchev and other Soviet leaders, Hutchison appealed for realism and noted that the Russians seemed more prepared to allow the matter to fade than were the British opposition. He noted that Britain was not the only nation with a secret service. In December 1956 Hutchison was elected as chairman of the Scottish Unionist members' committee.

In January 1957, Hutchison was the first British MP to visit Hungary after the uprising the previous year was put down. On his return he praised the Hungarian people, saying that they were determined not to back the Kádár régime. After some years as a delegate, in May 1957 Hutchison became President of the Assembly of the Western European Union.

== Atomic research ==
Hutchison increasingly concentrated on defence issues in the late 1950s, and also urged more investment in atomic research. He pressed in December 1957 for the United Kingdom to join the European Nuclear Energy Agency. His efforts saw success in May 1958 when the Government announced that a technical collaboration agreement with Euratom would be negotiated. The agreement was signed in February 1959. Hutchison was one of the sponsors of a Conservative backbench motion which rejected unilateral nuclear disarmament, which attracted over 100 signatories.

== Later business career ==
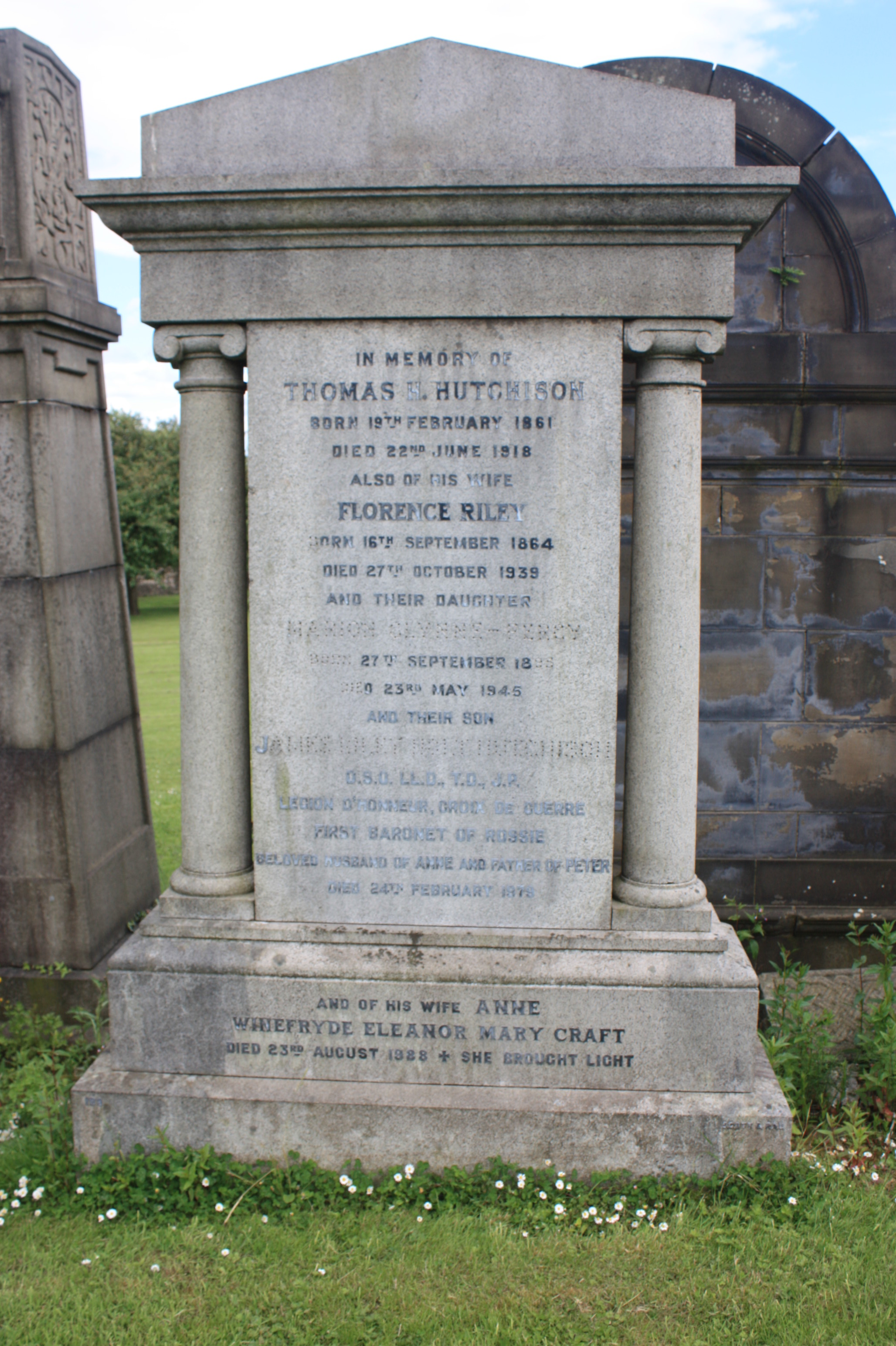
The grave of Sir James Riley Holt Hutchison, Glasgow Necropolis

In 1958 Hutchison announced that he would not seek re-election, and left Parliament at the 1959 general election. He became deputy president of Associated British Chambers of Commerce that year, and stepped up to be president from 1960 to 1962. He also served as a member of the Export Council for Europe from 1960. Hutchison was president of the Westminster Chamber of Commerce in 1963. He also held some political appointments, including as a member of a small committee examining applications from servicemen to be released from the forces in order to fight Parliamentary byelections.

Hutchison's work was honoured when he was made an Officer of the Venerable Order of Saint John in 1972, and he received an honorary Doctor of Laws degree from the University of Glasgow in 1973.

Hutchison is buried with his parents east of the summit in the Glasgow Necropolis.

Parliament of the United Kingdom
Preceded by William Alexander	Member of Parliament for Glasgow Central; 1945 – 1950	Succeeded by James McInnes
Preceded by Sir Arthur Young	Member of Parliament for Glasgow Scotstoun; 1950 – 1959	Succeeded by William Small
Political offices
Preceded by Woodrow Wyatt	Under-Secretary of State for War; 1951 – 1954	Succeeded by Fitzroy Maclean
Baronetage of the United Kingdom
New creation	Baronet (of Rossie); 1956–1979	Succeeded by Peter Hutchison
