= Sir Arthur Young, 1st Baronet =

Scottish Unionist Party politician

Sir Arthur Stewart Leslie Young, 1st Baronet (10 October 1889 – 14 August 1950) was a Scottish Unionist Party politician.

Educated at Fettes College, he served during the First World War in the Scottish Rifles, reaching the rank of major.

He sat as the member of parliament (MP) for Glasgow Partick (UK Parliament constituency) from 1935 to 1950, and then sat for Glasgow Scotstoun (UK Parliament constituency) until his death.

He was Parliamentary Private Secretary to the Under-Secretary of State for Scotland from 1937 and Parliamentary Private Secretary to the Secretary of State for Scotland from 1939. In 1941, he was appointed Scottish Unionist Whip. He was a Lord Commissioner of the Treasury from 1942 to 1944, and Vice-Chamberlain of HM Household from 1944 to 1945.

He was created a baronet on 7 September 1945.

== Arms ==
Coat of arms of Sir Arthur Young, 1st Baronet
Crest A lymphad Or under full sail its sail charged of the arms having a pennon Gules with the badge of Scotland in the hoist. Escutcheon Argent on three piles issuant from a chief Sable charged with three lymphads Or under full sail Argent flagged Gules as many annulets of the third. Motto Serve Wisely With Faith

Parliament of the United Kingdom
Preceded by Charles MacAndrew	Member of Parliament for Glasgow Partick; 1935–1950	Constituency abolished
New constituency	Member of Parliament for Glasgow Scotstoun; February 1950–October 1950	Succeeded by James Hutchison
Peerage of the United Kingdom
New creation	Baronet (of Partick); 1945–1950	Succeeded by Alastair Spencer Templeton Young
