= 1950 Glasgow Scotstoun by-election =

UK parliamentary by-election

The 1950 Glasgow Scotstoun by-election of 25 October 1950 was held after the death of Conservative MP Sir Arthur Young.

The seat was very marginal, having been won at the 1950 United Kingdom general election by 239 votes Labour again fielded W. Bargh, a Glasgow school teacher, who had narrowly failed to win the seat at the general election earlier in the year. The Conservative candidate was James Hutchison, who had been the MP for Glasgow Central from 1945 until the general election.

== Result of the previous general election ==
General election 1950: Glasgow Scotstoun
Party	Candidate	Votes	%	±%
Unionist	Arthur Young	19,294	46.54	
Labour	W. Bargh	19,055	45.96	
Liberal	W. Ferguson	2,023	4.88	
Communist	Bob McIlhone	1,088	2.62	
Majority		239	0.58	
Turnout		41,460	84.61	
Unionist win (new seat)				

== Result of the by-election ==
By-election 1950: Glasgow Scotstoun
Party	Candidate	Votes	%	±%
Unionist	James Hutchison	18,494	50.88	+4.34
Labour	W Bargh	17,175	47.25	+1.29
Ind. Labour Party	David Gibson	680	1.87	N/A
Majority		1,319	3.63	+3.04
Turnout		36,349		
Unionist hold		Swing	+1.53	

== Outcome ==
Reporting the result, The Glasgow Herald stated that the outcome of the election, an increased majority for the Conservatives, suggested that the Labour Party had lost ground in Scotland since the general election. Bargh felt that the intervention by the ILP had cost him victory, a view that Gibson, the ILP candidate did not share. The Conservative majority of 1,319 exceeded the number of votes (680) received by Gibson.

An editorial in The Glasgow Herald the morning after the contest commented that Hutchison's win had been expected, but said "it would have been a blow to Mr Churchill's hopes of turning Labour out at the next general election" had the Conservatives been returned without an increased majority. The same editorial said the Conservative majority had increased by a "gratifying number of votes" and attributed this to Hutchison having been known to have had a previously successful spell as a Glasgow MP and his exploiting disillusion with the Labour Government. It predicted that the result would "give the Unionist and Conservative party organisations the sort of stimulus they need in their efforts to drive the Government from power and office."
