= William Small (Scottish politician) =

British politician (1909–1978)

William Watson Small (19 October 1909 – 18 January 1978) was a Scottish Labour Party politician.

Small was educated at Calder School in Motherwell. He was an Ayrshire County Councillor from 1945 to 1951 and an active member of the Amalgamated Engineering Union, serving on its national committee from 1955 to 1957 and as president of the union's West Ayrshire district.

At the 1959 general election, he was elected as Member of Parliament for Glasgow Scotstoun. He held the seat until it was abolished for the February 1974 election, when he moved to the new Glasgow Garscadden constituency. He held that seat until his sudden death in London on 18 January 1978, aged 68.

Small never held ministerial office, but served as Parliamentary Private Secretary to the Minister of Power from 1964. At the time of his death he was living in Stevenston, North Ayrshire, which was his wife's home town.

Parliament of the United Kingdom
Preceded by Sir James Hutchison	Member of Parliament for Glasgow Scotstoun; 1959–Feb 1974	Constituency abolished
New constituency	Member of Parliament for Glasgow Garscadden; Feb 1974–1978	Succeeded by Donald Dewar
