= James Spence (surgeon) =

Scottish surgeon

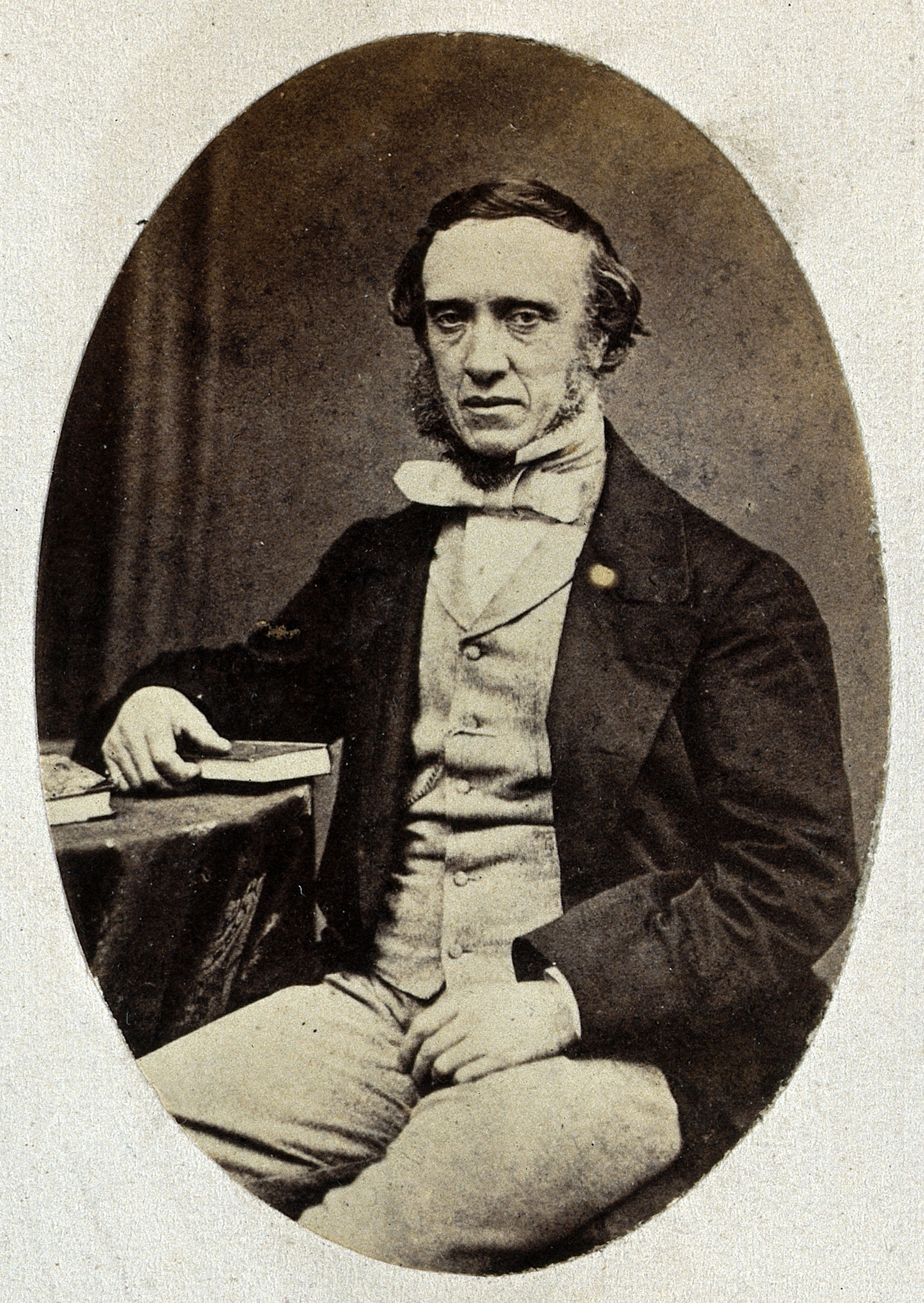
Dr James Spence

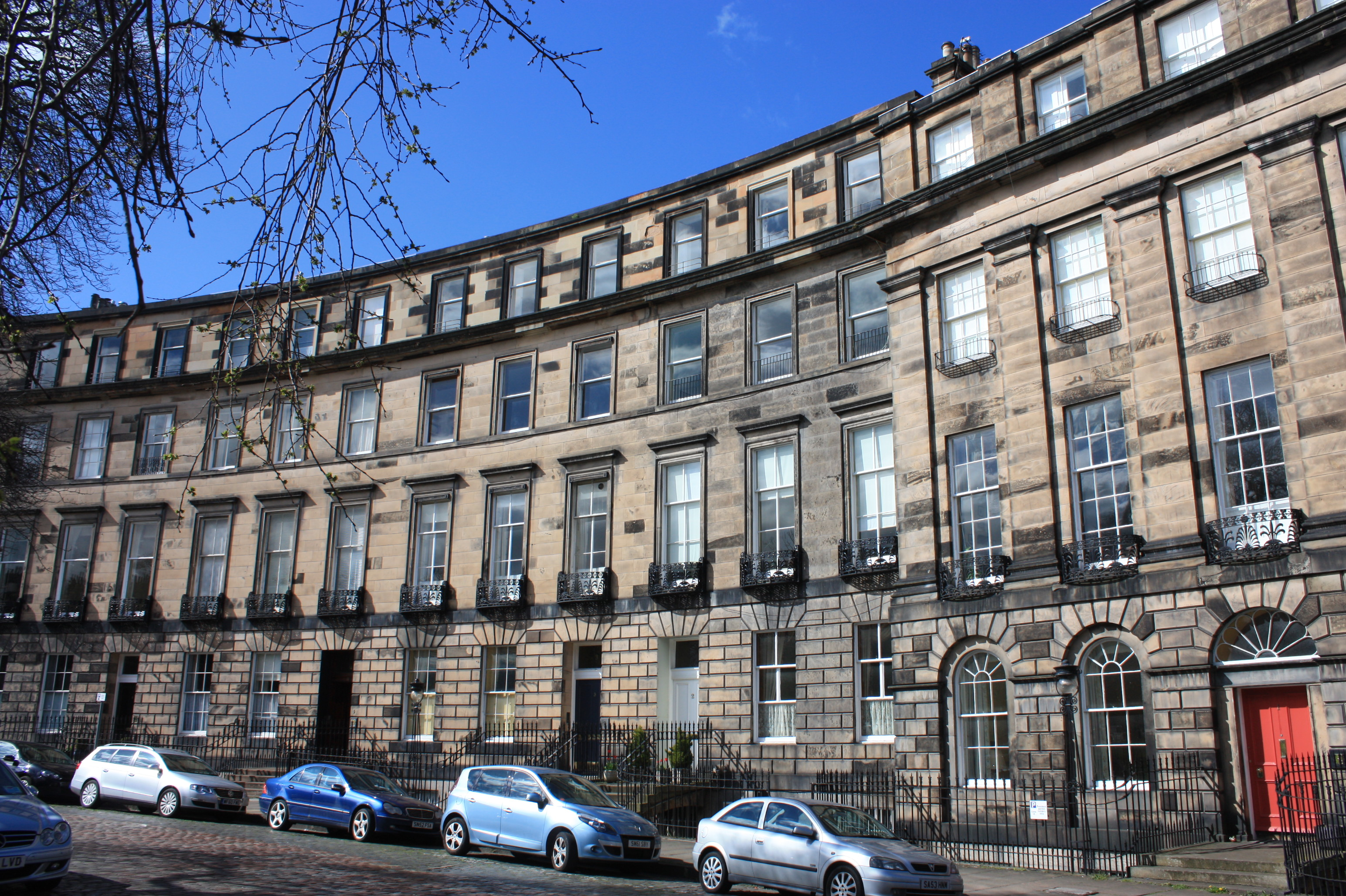
Ainslie Place, Edinburgh

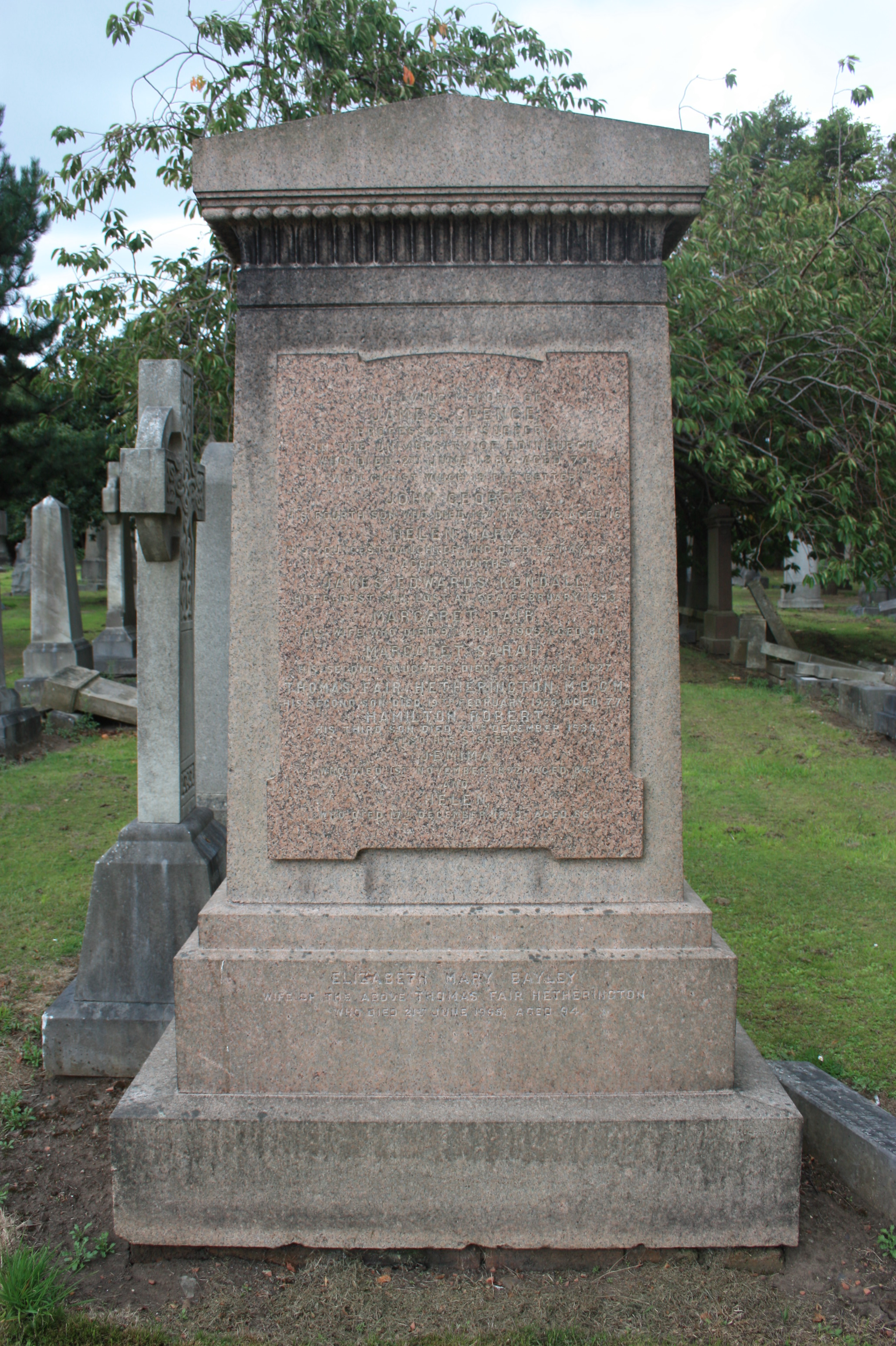
The grave of Dr James Spence, Grange Cemetery, Edinburgh

James Spence FRSE FRCSEd (1812-1882) was a Scottish surgeon. He served as President of the Royal College of Surgeons of Edinburgh 1867/68.

== Life ==
He was born on 31 March 1812 at 12 South Bridge in Edinburgh, the son of James Spence, a perfumer, and his third wife.

He was educated at a boarding-school in Galashiels and afterwards at the Royal High School, Edinburgh. He studied medicine at the University of Edinburgh, but left to be apprenticed to Messrs. Scott & Orr, a firm of Edinburgh chemists, at 100 South Bridge. He managed, however, to complete his medical education in the Edinburgh Extramural School of Medicine and in 1832 received the diploma of Licentiate of the Royal College of Surgeons of Edinburgh.

On qualifying he made two voyages to Calcutta in 1833 as surgeon to an East Indiaman, but returned to Edinburgh to teach anatomy for 7 years as the university demonstrator under Professor Alexander Monro tertius. He then joined the extramural school of anatomy to act as demonstrator where he took part in the lecture-room course of demonstrations on regional anatomy, as well as in the dissecting-room teaching.

He left the dissecting-room in 1846 to give lectures on surgery. In 1849, on becoming a Fellow of the Royal College of Surgeons, he lectured systematically on surgery, first at number one Surgeons' Square and then at the Extramural School of Medicine at Surgeons' Hall. He became assistant surgeon at Edinburgh Royal Infirmary in 1850, full surgeon in 1854 and clinical lecturer in 1856. As professor of surgery, he was surgeon at the Infirmary until his death. In 1869 Byrom Bramwell served under Spence as his house surgeon at the Infirmary.

In 1852 Spence was elected a member of the Harveian Society of Edinburgh and served as President in 1871.

In 1864, he was given the chair of systematic surgery as Professor of Surgical Science at Edinburgh University in place of Prof James Miller In 1865 he was appointed Surgeon in Ordinary to Queen Victoria in Scotland and in 1867 was elected President of the Royal College of Surgeons of Edinburgh for 2 years. He was elected a Fellow of the Royal Society of Edinburgh in 1866 his proposer being Sir David Brewster.

Later in life, Spence's leg was amputated. He asked to dissect the limb after the operation.

He died at home, 21 Ainslie Place on the Moray Estate in western Edinburgh on 6 June 1882. He was buried in the Grange Cemetery, Edinburgh. The graves lies in the main south-west section facing onto the south path. His wife and children lie with him.

== Publications ==
He published Lectures on Surgery in 1871.

== Family ==
In 1847 married Margaret Fair (1825-1905), the daughter of Thomas Fair of Buenos Aires, joint founder of St John's Anglican Church in that city, with whom he had six sons and three daughters.

These included John George Spence (1854-1870), Helen Mary Spence (died an infant), Margaret Sarah Spence (d.1927), Thomas Fair Hetherington Spence, a physician (1851-1928), James Edward Kendall Spence (died at sea 1893), and Hamilton Robert Spence (d.1936).

== Scientific recognition ==
The Tail of Spence, an extension of the tissue of the breast that extends into the axilla, is named after him.

== Artistic recognition ==
He was photographed by Hill & Adamson around 1850.

== See also ==
- List of people educated at the Royal High School
- Royal College of Surgeons of Edinburgh
