= Glasgow Garscadden =

UK Parliament constituency (1974–1997)

- Former burgh constituency for the House of Commons
- Subdivision: City of Glasgow district

1974–1997
- Seats: One
- Created from: Glasgow Scotstoun
- Replaced by: Glasgow Anniesland

Glasgow Garscadden was a burgh constituency represented in the House of Commons of the Parliament of the United Kingdom from 1974 until 1997. It elected one Member of Parliament (MP) using the first-past-the-post voting system.

== Boundaries ==
This constituency comprised the north western periphery of the City of Glasgow.

In 1974 Garscadden was defined as comprising the Knightswood and Yoker wards of Glasgow. Before the redistribution these areas had been part of the Glasgow Scotstoun constituency.

In the 1983 redistribution the seat was only changed slightly. The whole of the old Garscadden formed 98.5% of the new constituency. A small area, further in towards the city centre, was detached from the pre-1983 Glasgow Hillhead and contributed the remaining 1.5% of the new Garscadden's electorate.

In terms of City of Glasgow electoral divisions the 1983 seat was defined as 9 (Drumry/Summerhill), 10 (Blairdardie/Knightscliffe), and 11 (Yoker/Knightswood).

== Members of Parliament ==
| Election | Member | Party | Notes |
|---|---|---|---|
| Feb 1974 | Willie Small | Labour | Died January 1978 |
| 1978 by-election | Donald Dewar | Labour | Subsequently, MP for Glasgow Anniesland 1997–2000; First Minister of Scotland 1999–2000 |
| 1997 | constituency abolished: see Glasgow Anniesland | | |

== Election results ==
=== Elections of the 1970s ===
General election February 1974: Glasgow Garscadden
| Party | Candidate | Votes | % | ±% |
|---|---|---|---|---|
| Labour | William Small | 21,035 | 52.3 | |
| Conservative | James Grant Rae | 9,771 | 24.3 | |
| SNP | Malcolm McRury | 8,789 | 21.9 | |
| Communist | Sammy Barr | 635 | 1.6 | |
| Majority | | 11,264 | 28.0 | |
| Turnout | | 40,230 | 74.1 | |
| Labour win (new seat) | | | | |

General election October 1974: Glasgow Garscadden
| Party | Candidate | Votes | % | ±% |
|---|---|---|---|---|
| Labour | William Small | 19,737 | 50.9 | −1.4 |
| SNP | Keith Sydney Bovey | 12,111 | 31.2 | +9.3 |
| Conservative | John Corbett | 5,004 | 12.9 | −9.4 |
| Liberal | Michael Royston Kibby | 1,915 | 4.9 | New |
| Majority | | 7,626 | 19.7 | −8.3 |
| Turnout | | 38,767 | 70.9 | −3.2 |
| Labour hold | | Swing | | |
| Registered electors | | 54,700 | | |

- Death of William Small 18 January 1978

By-Election 1978: Glasgow Garscadden
| Party | Candidate | Votes | % | ±% |
|---|---|---|---|---|
| Labour | Donald Dewar | 16,507 | 45.4 | −5.5 |
| SNP | Keith Sydney Bovey | 11,955 | 32.9 | +1.7 |
| Conservative | Iain Macdonald Lawson | 6,746 | 18.5 | +5.6 |
| SLP | Shiona Farrell | 583 | 1.6 | N/A |
| Communist | Sammy Barr | 407 | 1.1 | New |
| Socialist Workers | Peter Porteous | 166 | 0.5 | New |
| Majority | | 4,552 | 12.5 | −7.2 |
| Turnout | | 36,364 | 69.1 | −1.8 |
| Labour hold | | Swing | | |
| Registered electors | | 57,603 | | |

General election 1979: Glasgow Garscadden
| Party | Candidate | Votes | % | ±% |
|---|---|---|---|---|
| Labour | Donald Dewar | 23,591 | 61.5 | +10.6 |
| Conservative | Iain Macdonald Lawson | 8,393 | 21.9 | +9.0 |
| SNP | Jim Bain | 6,012 | 15.7 | −15.5 |
| Communist | Sammy Barr | 374 | 1.0 | N/A |
| Majority | | 15,198 | 39.6 | +19.9 |
| Turnout | | 38,370 | 73.2 | +2.3 |
| Labour hold | | Swing | | |

=== Elections of the 1980s ===
General election 1983: Glasgow Garscadden
| Party | Candidate | Votes | % | ±% |
|---|---|---|---|---|
| Labour | Donald Dewar | 19,635 | 56.2 | −5.3 |
| SDP | William Lyden | 6,161 | 17.6 | New |
| Conservative | Kenneth Macleod | 5,368 | 15.4 | −7.2 |
| SNP | Norman MacLeod | 3,566 | 10.2 | −5.7 |
| Communist | Sammy Barr | 218 | 0.6 | −0.4 |
| Majority | | 13,474 | 38.6 | −1.0 |
| Turnout | | 34,948 | 69.1 | −4.1 |
| Labour hold | | Swing | | |

General election 1987: Glasgow Garscadden
| Party | Candidate | Votes | % | ±% |
|---|---|---|---|---|
| Labour | Donald Dewar | 23,178 | 67.7 | +11.5 |
| SNP | Andrew Brophy | 4,201 | 12.2 | +2.0 |
| Conservative | Thomas N. A. Begg | 3,660 | 10.7 | −4.7 |
| SDP | James Callison | 3,211 | 9.4 | −8.2 |
| Majority | | 18,977 | 55.5 | +16.9 |
| Turnout | | 34,250 | 71.4 | +2.3 |
| Labour hold | | Swing | +8.0 | |

=== Elections of the 1990s ===
General election 1992: Glasgow Garscadden
| Party | Candidate | Votes | % | ±% |
|---|---|---|---|---|
| Labour | Donald Dewar | 18,920 | 64.4 | −3.3 |
| SNP | Dick Douglas | 5,580 | 19.0 | +6.8 |
| Conservative | James L. P. Scott | 3,385 | 11.5 | +0.8 |
| Liberal Democrats | Chic Brodie | 1,425 | 4.9 | −4.5 |
| Natural Law | William G. Orr | 61 | 0.2 | New |
| Majority | | 13,340 | 45.4 | −10.1 |
| Turnout | | 29,371 | 71.3 | −0.1 |
| Labour hold | | Swing | | |

== See also ==
- 1978 Glasgow Garscadden by-election
