= Elizabeth Burns (poet) =

English poet and creative writing teacher

- Born: 14 December 1957; Wisbech, Isle of Ely, Cambridgeshire, England
- Died: 20 August 2015 (aged 57); Lancaster, Lancashire, England
- Education: University of St. Andrews (MA)
- Occupations: poet, creative writing teacher

Elizabeth Burns (1957–2015) was an English poet and creative writing teacher.

== Early life and education ==
Elizabeth Burns was born on 14 December 1957, in Wisbech, Isle of Ely, Cambridgeshire. Her mother Muriel (Hayward) was from Bristol and her father, David Grieve Burns from Kirkcaldy. Burns spent her early life in Scotland, educated at Corstorphine Primary School and Craigmount High in Edinburgh. Between 1976 and 1980 she studied English Language and Literature at the University of St. Andrews, graduating with an MA. In her twenties, living in Edinburgh, she was a leading member of the First of May Bookshop collective in Edinburgh as well as an early member of the Pomegranate women's writing group.

She spent much of her later life in Lancaster, teaching and writing, and died in August 2015 aged 57.

== Poetry ==
The central themes of Elizabeth Burns's work are around 'making what was invisible, visible through words and images' often delicately poised moments of home life, music, literature and art.

She published five collections of poetry as well as several pamphlets and often collaborated with other artists: potters, weaver and painters. Her work has appeared in numerous magazines and anthologies.

== Spiral ==
In 2015, one of her poems, Spiral, which is inspired by the motion of a potter's wheel, was reproduced on a 25 x 8 metre banner on the Royal Mile Edinburgh to mark National Poetry Day.

The poem appears in the latest collection of her poems Lightkeepers, published in 2016 by Wayleave Press and compiled after her death by friends and fellow poets, Gerrie Fellows and Jane Routh.

== Published work ==
- Ophelia and other Poems (Polygon) 1999
- The Gift of Light (diehard) 2000
- The Lantern Bearers (Shoestring Press) 2007
- Held (Polygon) 2010
- Clay (Wayleave Press) 2015 ISBN 9780992894696
- Lightkeepers (Wayleave) 2016

== Awards and recognition ==
- Shortlisted for the Saltire Society First Book of the Year award for Ophelia and other Poems 1991
- Winner of the BBC Radio 3 Proms Poetry Competition 2012
- Manchester Cathedral's Poet of the Year 2013
- Shortlisted for the Ted Hughes Award for Clay 2016
- Runner-up in the Callum Macdonald Memorial Awards for Clay 2016
