= Donald Dewar =

First Minister of Scotland from 1999 to 2000

The Right Honourable Donald Dewar
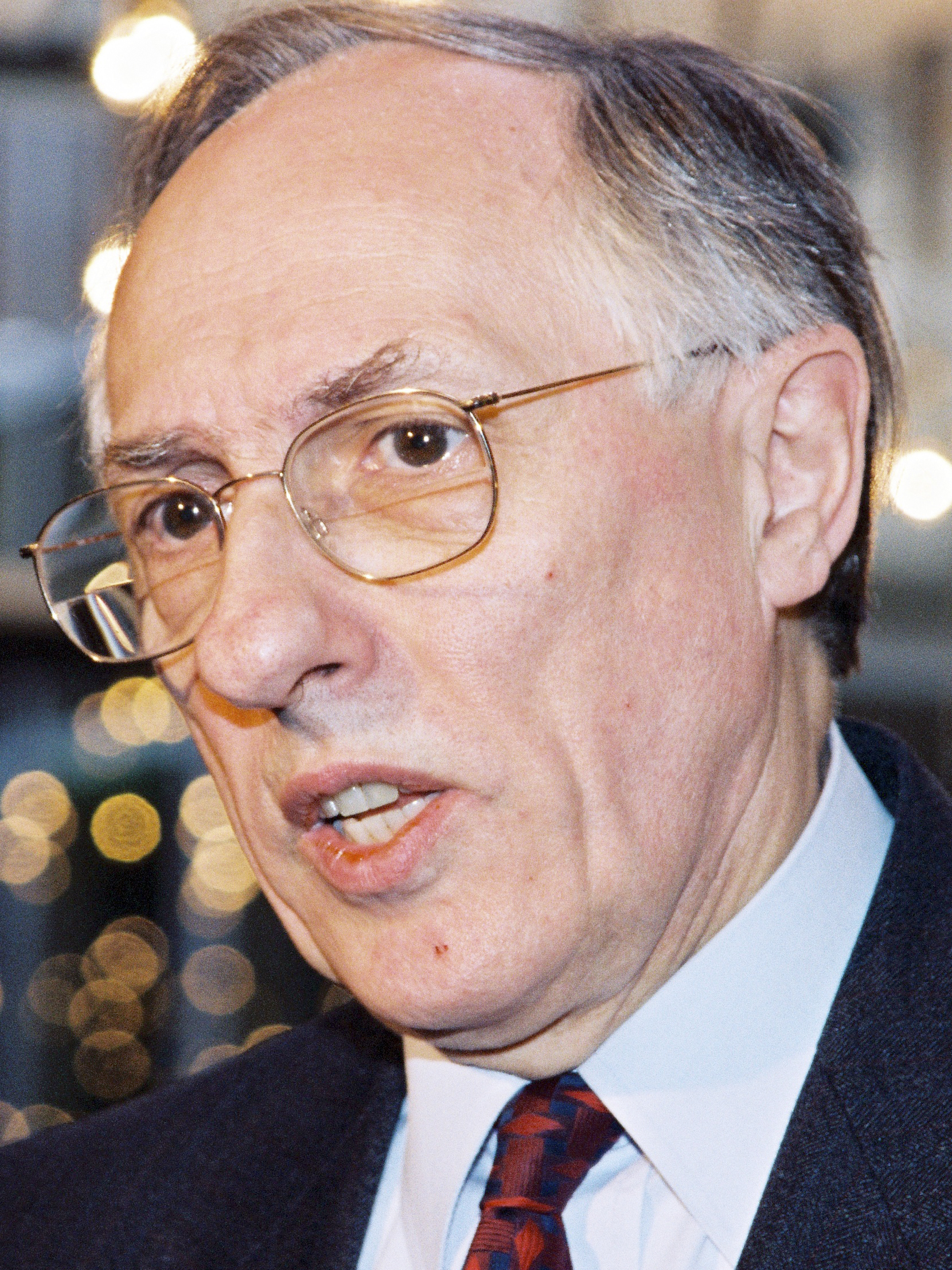
- Dewar in 1999

First Minister of Scotland
- In office 17 May 1999 – 11 October 2000
- Monarch: Elizabeth II
- Deputy: Jim Wallace
- Preceded by: Office established
- Succeeded by: Henry McLeish (Note: Jim Wallace acted from 11 October 2000 to 27 October 2000)

Leader of the Labour Party in Scotland
- In office 19 September 1998 – 11 October 2000
- UK party leader: Tony Blair
- Preceded by: Position established
- Succeeded by: Henry McLeish

Secretary of State for Scotland
- In office 2 May 1997 – 17 May 1999
- Prime Minister: Tony Blair
- Preceded by: Michael Forsyth
- Succeeded by: John Reid
Shadow cabinet posts
Opposition Chief Whip of the House of Commons
In office 19 October 1995 – 2 May 1997
| Leader | Tony Blair |
| Preceded by | Derek Foster |
| Succeeded by | Alastair Goodlad |
Shadow Secretary of State for Social Security
In office 24 July 1992 – 19 October 1995
| Leader | John Smith; Margaret Beckett (acting); Tony Blair |
| Preceded by | Michael Meacher |
| Succeeded by | Chris Smith |
Shadow Secretary of State for Scotland
In office 31 October 1983 – 24 July 1992
| Leader | Neil Kinnock |
| Preceded by | Bruce Millan |
| Succeeded by | Tom Clarke |
Parliamentary offices
Member of the Scottish Parliament for Glasgow Anniesland
In office 6 May 1999 – 11 October 2000
| Preceded by | Constituency established |
| Succeeded by | Bill Butler |
Member of Parliament for Glasgow Anniesland Glasgow Garscadden (1978–1997)
In office 13 April 1978 – 11 October 2000
| Preceded by | William Small |
| Succeeded by | John Robertson |
Member of Parliament for Aberdeen South
In office 31 March 1966 – 29 May 1970
| Preceded by | Priscilla Buchan |
| Succeeded by | Iain Sproat |

Personal details
- Born: 21 August 1937 Glasgow, Scotland
- Died: 11 October 2000 (aged 63) Edinburgh, Scotland
- Party: Scottish Labour
- Spouse: Alison McNair (m. 1964; div. 1973)
- Children: 2
- Education: University of Glasgow

Donald Campbell Dewar (21 August 1937 – 11 October 2000) was a Scottish statesman and politician who served as the first first minister of Scotland from 1999 until his death in 2000 and leader of the Labour Party in Scotland from 1998 until his death in 2000. He was widely regarded as the "Father of the Nation" during his tenure as first minister, and the "Architect of Devolution" whilst serving as Secretary of State for Scotland from 1997 to 1999. He was Member of Parliament (MP) for Glasgow Anniesland (formerly Glasgow Garscadden) from 1978 to 2000. Dewar was also Member of the Scottish Parliament (MSP) for the equivalent seat from 1999 to 2000.

Born in Glasgow, Dewar studied history, and later law, at the University of Glasgow. Before entering politics, he worked as a solicitor in Glasgow. At the age of 28, he was elected to the House of Commons, representing Aberdeen South from 1966 to 1970. After losing his seat, he returned to law and hosted his own Friday evening talk show on Radio Clyde. Dewar was re-elected in the 1978 Glasgow Garscadden by-election and served as the MP until his death in 2000. Following Labour's landslide victory in 1997, he was appointed Secretary of State for Scotland by Prime Minister Tony Blair. As the Scottish secretary, he was an advocate of Scottish devolution, and campaigned for a Scottish Parliament in the 1997 Scottish devolution referendum. Following a successful campaign, Dewar worked on creating the Scotland Act 1998.

Dewar led the Labour campaign through the first Scottish Parliament election and was elected a Member of the Scottish Parliament (MSP) for Glasgow Anniesland. On 7 May 1999, he was appointed Leader of the Labour Party in Scotland and he led coalition talks with the Scottish Liberal Democrats. Following successful talks, the Labour-Liberal Democrat coalition was announced. Dewar was elected as first minister on 13 May 1999, by a vote of the parliament, and formed the first Scottish Executive cabinet. As first minister, he set out the legislative programme for the Executive which included: an Education bill to improve standards in Scottish schools; land reform to give right of access to the countryside, a bill to abolish the feudal system of land tenure; and a bill to establish national parks in Scotland.

On 10 October 2000, Dewar slipped and fell to the ground, and the following day he died of a brain hemorrhage at the age of 63 while still in office. Deputy First Minister Jim Wallace served as the acting first minister, until Henry McLeish was announced to succeed Dewar.

== Early life and education ==
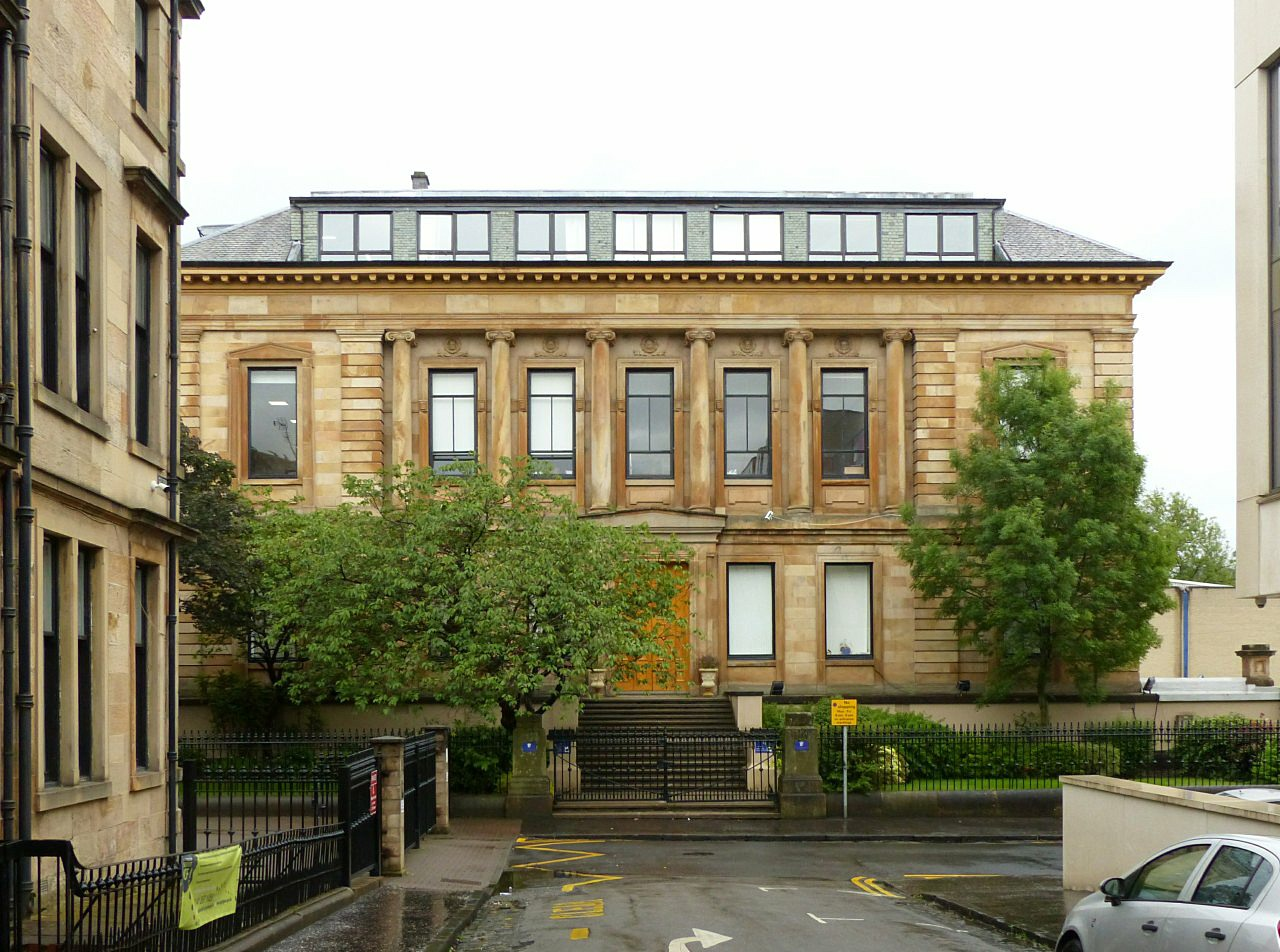
Dewar attended The Glasgow Academy, which at the time, was an all boys independent school in Hillhead.

Donald Campbell Dewar was born on Saturday, 21 August 1937 at 194 Renfrew Street, Glasgow. He grew up in a middle-class household in Kelvingrove as the only child of Dr. Alasdair Dewar, a consultant dermatologist, and Mary Howat Dewar (née Bennett). Both of Dewar's parents had ill health during his childhood; his father contracted tuberculosis and his mother suffered from a benign brain tumour when he was young.

Dewar attended a small school in the Scottish Borders during the Second World War. From the age of nine, he was educated at Mosspark Primary School and then The Glasgow Academy. He made few friends at school and blamed his "shyness and gauche manner" on his experience as being an only child. A year before his death, Dewar admitted that he had been an "isolated misfit" in his youth, which is a reason for his public image of being awkward.

In 1957, Dewar attended the University of Glasgow where his father, mother, two uncles and aunt also attended. He met several future politicians at the university Dialectic Society, including John Smith, who would later become leader of the Labour Party, Sir Menzies Campbell, who would later become leader of the Liberal Democrats, and Lord Irvine of Lairg, who would serve as Lord Chancellor. He met Alison McNair at Glasgow University, who he would later marry in 1964.

Dewar was an editor of the Glasgow University Guardian and sales manager for Glasgow University Magazine in 1960. He served as chairman of the University Labour Club from 1961 from 1962 and president of the Glasgow University Union. Dewar was an Honorary Secretary of the Students' Representative Council. In 1962, he campaigned for Albert Luthuli, the banned African National Congress leader, as University Rector.

In 1961, Dewar gained a Master of Arts degree in History and in 1964 a second-class Bachelor of Law degree. After graduating, he worked as a solicitor in Glasgow.

== Member of Parliament (1966–1970) ==
Dewar was a member of the Labour Party, and soon turned his sights towards being elected to parliament. In 1962, he was selected as the Labour candidate for the Aberdeen South constituency. In the 1964 general election, he failed to win the seat, but won it at the 1966 general election at the age of 28 defeating Priscilla Tweedsmuir by 1,799 votes.

In his maiden speech to the House of Commons on 4 May 1966, Dewar spoke against a proposed increase on potato tax. His speech became his first political success: as the tax was repealed the following year. Dewar was made a member of the public accounts committee and in October 1967, he was appointed a Parliamentary Private Secretary to the President of the Board of Trade, Anthony Crosland.

Dewar remained in that position at the Department of Education until 1969, in which year he opposed a visit to Aberdeen by the Springbok rugby team and staged a silent vigil near the team's ground. In April 1968, he was proposed for a Minister of State position by Roy Jenkins, but was not appointed. Dewar lost his constituency seat to the Conservative candidate Iain Sproat at the 1970 general election by over 1,000 votes.

== Out of parliament ==
Dewar spent much of the 1970s looking for another parliamentary seat. He hosted a Friday evening talk show on Radio Clyde, and in June 1971 was beaten by Dennis Canavan when he applied for the seat of West Stirlingshire. He worked as a solicitor for much of that decade and became a reporter on children's panels and was involved with the Lanarkshire local authority. Dewar became a partner in Ross Harper Murphy, in 1975.

== Return to parliament (1978–1999) ==
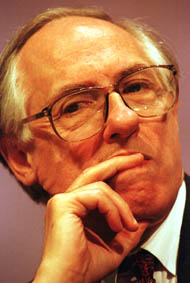
Dewar, c. 1999

=== 1978 Glasgow Garscadden by-election ===
Donald Dewar was selected for the seat of Glasgow Garscadden by a majority of three, after Dewar's friend in the Amalgamated Union of Engineering Workers, MP Willie Small, died unexpectedly. He was returned to parliament at a by-election on 13 April 1978, a crucial victory which was seen as halting the rise of the Scottish National Party.

=== 1979 devolution referendum ===
In Scotland's first referendum on devolution, held in March 1979, he campaigned for a "Yes" vote alongside the Conservative Alick Buchanan-Smith and the Liberal Russell Johnston. Though they won a narrow majority, it fell short of the 40% required, contributing to the downfall of the Callaghan Government, in May 1979.

=== Front bench opposition ===
Dewar gained a parliamentary platform as chairman of the Scottish Affairs Select Committee. After a year honing his inquisitorial skills, he joined the front bench in November 1980 as a Scottish affairs spokesman when Michael Foot became party leader. In 1981, as the Labour Party divided itself further due to internal disagreement, Dewar was almost deselected in his constituency by hard left activists, but he successfully defended himself against this threat.

He rose quickly through the ranks, becoming Shadow Scottish Secretary in November 1983. On 21 December 1988, Dewar was in Lockerbie after the bombing of Pan Am Flight 103, as the member of the Shadow Cabinet in charge of Scottish affairs. In 1992, John Smith made him Shadow Social security Secretary and three years later, Dewar was made a Chief Whip for the Labour Party by Tony Blair.

== Secretary of State for Scotland (1997–1999) ==
At the 1997 general election, he became MP for Glasgow Anniesland, which was mostly the same constituency with minor boundary changes. Labour won this election by a landslide, and Dewar was given the post of Secretary of State for Scotland. He was able to start the devolution process he dreamt of years earlier, and worked on creating the Scotland Act, popularly referred to as "Smith's unfinished business". When ratified, this was to give Scotland its first Parliament for nearly 300 years.

In January 1998, he confirmed that he would stand for a seat in the Scottish Parliament. The first elections to the Scottish Parliament were held on 6 May 1999, with Dewar leading the Scottish Labour Party against their main opponents, the Scottish National Party led by Alex Salmond. He was elected as the Member of the Scottish Parliament (MSP) for Glasgow Anniesland, having the unusual distinction of being both an MP and MSP for the same constituency.

== First Minister of Scotland (1999–2000) ==
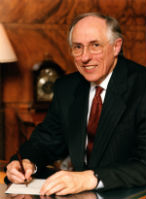
Official first ministerial portrait, 1999

=== Election ===
On 13 May 1999, Dewar was elected by the Scottish Parliament for the nominee for First Minister of Scotland, after receiving 71 votes by MSPs. On 17 May, he received the Royal Warrant of Appointment by Her Majesty the Queen at Holyroodhouse and was officially sworn in at the Court of Session.

There shall be a Scottish parliament.' Through long years, those words were first a hope, then a belief, then a promise. Now they are a reality.

— Dewar, at the official opening of the Scottish Parliament on 1 July 1999.

=== Entering government ===
Although Scottish Labour won more seats than any other party, they did not have a majority in Parliament to allow them to form an Executive without the help of a smaller party. A deal was agreed with the Scottish Liberal Democrats to form a coalition, with Dewar agreeing to their demand for the abolition of up front tuition fees for university students.

On 13 May 1999, Dewar was nominated as first minister, and was officially appointed by the Queen on 17 May at a ceremony in the Palace of Holyroodhouse. He later travelled to the Court of Session to be sworn in by the lord president and receive the Great Seal of Scotland.

Dewar made his initial appointments to the first Scottish cabinet in over 300 years in May 1999. Before the formal announcement of his cabinet appointments, Dewar said that he was "confident" that he had "chosen a strong team who will serve Scotland well".

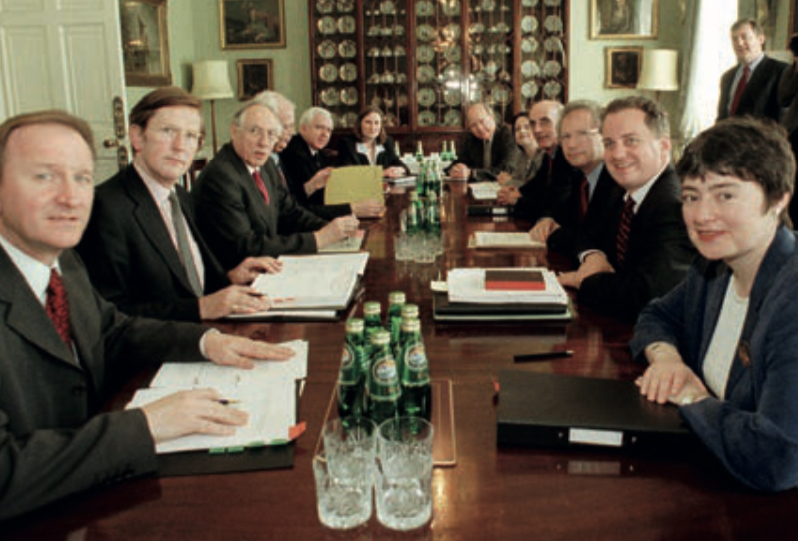
Dewar chairs the first reconvened Scottish Cabinet as First Minister

Dewar decided to re–organise most of the former portfolios of the preceding Scottish Office, the department of the UK Government responsible for Scotland prior to the establishment of the Scottish Executive and Scottish Parliament. The only exception to this was the creation of a new ministerial post for justice and the introduction of new ministerial posts for children and education, social inclusion, local government and housing, a minister to be responsible for rural affairs and the first Scottish finance minister who would be directly responsible for the budget of the Scottish Parliament.

Ahead of announcing his cabinet, Dewar advocated that he had created his team in order to ensure the Scottish Labour and Scottish Liberal Democrat coalition would be an effective administration for Scotland. Some of the key appointments to Dewar's cabinet included Jim Wallace as the deputy first minister and Minister for Justice, Henry McLeish was appointed as the Minister for Enterprise and Lifelong Learning and Sam Galbraith who was appointed as the Minister for Health.

As first minister, Dewar was also responsible for the appointment of the two highest law officers of Scotland. Both Lord Hardie and Colin Boyd continued in their respective roles as Lord Advocate and Solicitor General for Scotland following their initial appointments in 1997. Less than 24 hours after announcing his cabinet, Dewar announced the eleven junior ministers of his cabinet.

=== Legislation proposals ===
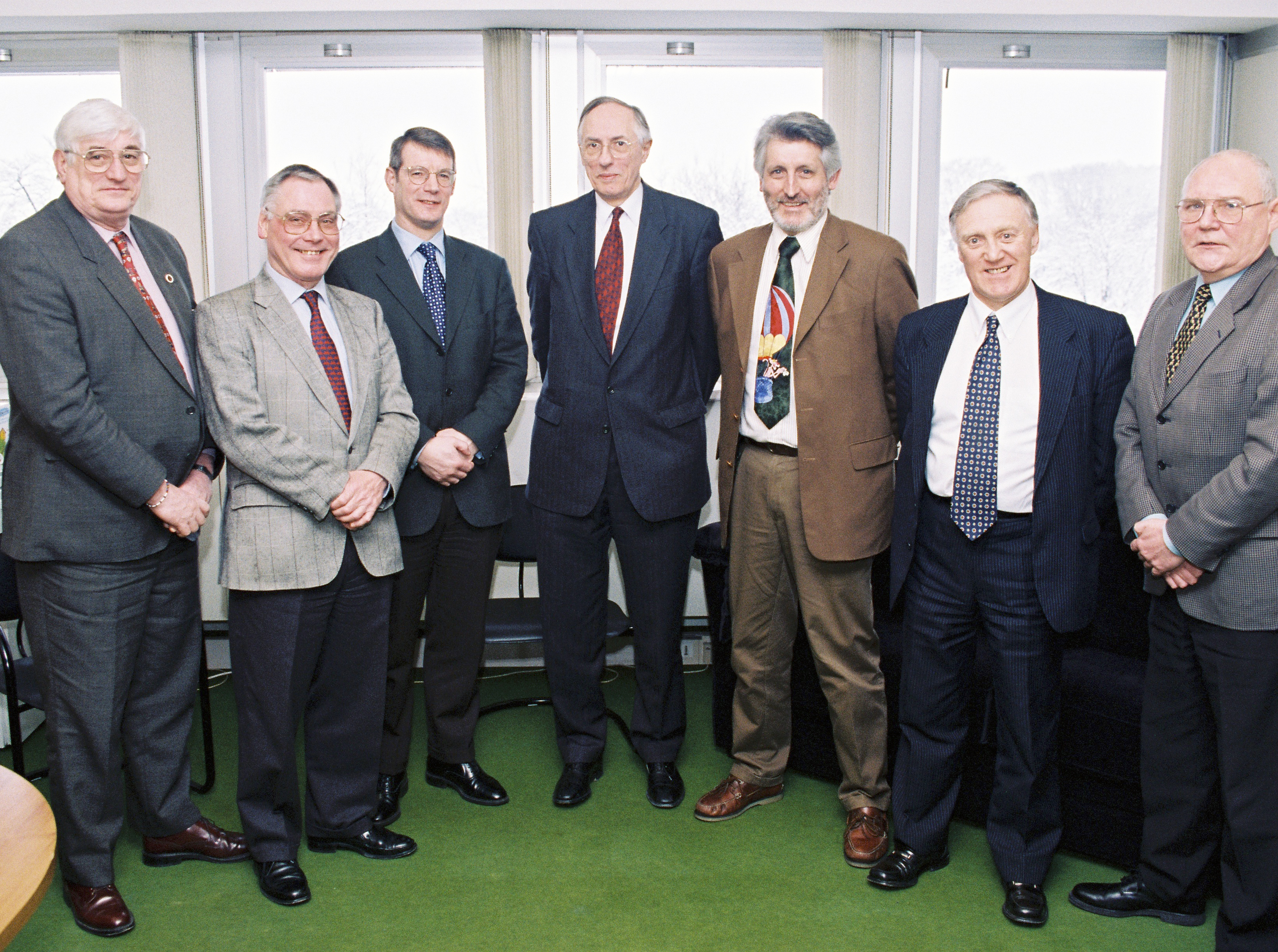
Dewar (centre) in Strasbourg, February 1999

Ahead of forming the coalition with the Scottish Liberal Democrats, Dewar was urged not to succumb to pressure to scrap tuition fees in Scotland, mostly by the then Chancellor of the Exchequer Gordon Brown and education secretary David Blunkett of the UK Government. The Scottish Liberal Democrats claimed that any agreement to form a coalition administration with the Scottish Labour Party would require a commitment for tuition fees to be scrapped, and that the party would "not compromise" on the issue.

On 16 June, Dewar set out the legislative programme for the Executive which included: an Education bill to improve standards in Scottish schools; land reform to give right of access to the countryside, a bill to abolish the feudal system of land tenure; and a bill to establish national parks in Scotland.

On 23 March 2000, Dewar presided over the launch of a consultation paper by his Minister for Justice, Jim Wallace, on stalking and harassment in Scotland. The Scottish Executive intended for the consultation paper to be used as an exercise to consult with the public to determine whether existing Scots law was sufficient to protect victims of stalking and harassment or whether to determine that new laws should be introduced. Wallace claimed that the "Scottish Executive was well aware of the devastating consequences stalking can have".

=== Adult literacy rates ===
In May 2000, a report indicated that 400,000 Scots were unable to source employment as a result of poor adult literacy rates, with the estimated total being roughly one million adults deemed as "functionally illiterate". In response, Henry McLeish, the Minister for Enterprise and Lifelong Learning in the Dewar government confirmed that "efforts would be made to gather exact statistics to tackle the issue". Dewar and the government were criticised due to there being a considerable lack of opportunities and programmes available to provide basic adult education similar to programmes that had already been established in England and in Wales.

=== Social justice and poverty ===
During his tenure as first minister, Dewar claiming that tackling poverty was the main agenda for the Scottish Executive. To reduce the level of poverty in Scotland, Dewar vowed that Scottish Executive policy would largely follow the policy agenda as set by the UK Government, claiming that the "exchange of ideas with Westminster is vital" but claimed that "we must never be afraid to take a different path when that is in Scotland's interest". Dewar supported an increase in spending available from the UK Government to be used by the Scottish Executive and had indicated that additional funds could be used to progress the executive's work on tackling poverty.

Under Dewar, the Scottish Executive also spearheaded policy relating to social justice, including deprivation and disadvantage. Dewar stated that the executive was committed to tackling the core root of the issues to be "sure that all our children have the best start in life" whilst also advocating the role education and employment plays in social justice.

=== Education and employment ===
During his time in office, Dewar presided over record levels of employment in Scotland and advocated that this was in part the responsibility of his executives agenda and policies. Dewar claimed that the introduction of quality child-care, the national minimum income guarantee for pensioners and the establishment of the "New Deal" had "laid the foundations" for an increase in employment in the country. Additionally, Dewar was hopeful that strong numbers of 18 year olds in full time education would continue to increase under his premiership, stating that he wanted to "skill the workforce, not only to make the Scottish economy truly competitive but to provide opportunities for the individual".

=== Absence for surgery ===
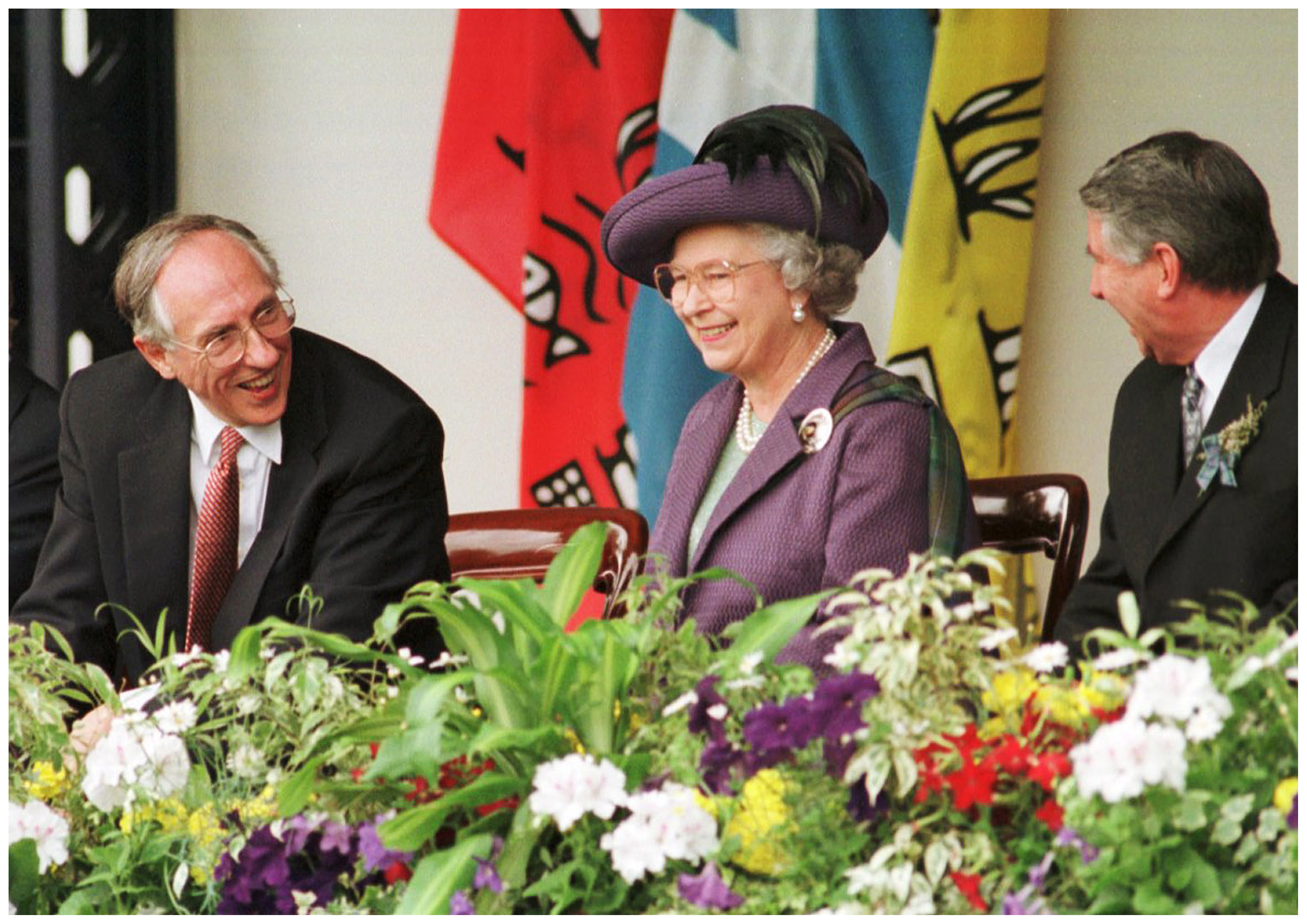
Dewar (left) at the state opening of the Scottish Parliament alongside Queen Elizabeth II and Presiding Officer David Steel, 1999

Around April 2000, Dewar temporarily stepped back from his duties as first minister to allow him to undergo heart surgery. For a period of four months, he was succeeded by his deputy first minister Jim Wallace as Acting first minister. Following his surgery, Dewar publicly thanked NHS Scotland for their "care and commitment" in which he claimed "did so much for me over this period".

Upon resuming his post of first minister in August 2000, Dewar praised Wallace's tenure as acting first minister, acknowledging his "distinction, style and energy" and praised his "success at question time is only the most visible aspect of a job well done". Additionally, Dewar issued a public message of thanks to both the Scottish Parliament and cabinet colleagues for messages following his surgery. Upon resuming his government duties, Dewar was said to be "in fine form" with Dewar claiming he was "looking forward to working with colleagues to drive forward the Executive's agenda".

=== Lobbygate scandal ===
One of the first scandals to hit the new Scottish Parliament occurred when allegations that the lobbying arm of public relations company Beattie Media had privileged access to ministers were published, prompting Dewar to ask the standards committee to investigate the reports. The minister for finance, Jack McConnell, was called to appear before the standards committee during the investigation although he was later cleared of any wrongdoing and the committee declared there was no evidence he had been influenced from lobbying by Beattie Media.

Dewar also threatened to sack any minister or aide who briefed the media against another member of the Scottish Executive, following public rows between Jack McConnell and Health Minister Susan Deacon over the budget allocated to health .

=== 2000 SQA examinations controversy ===
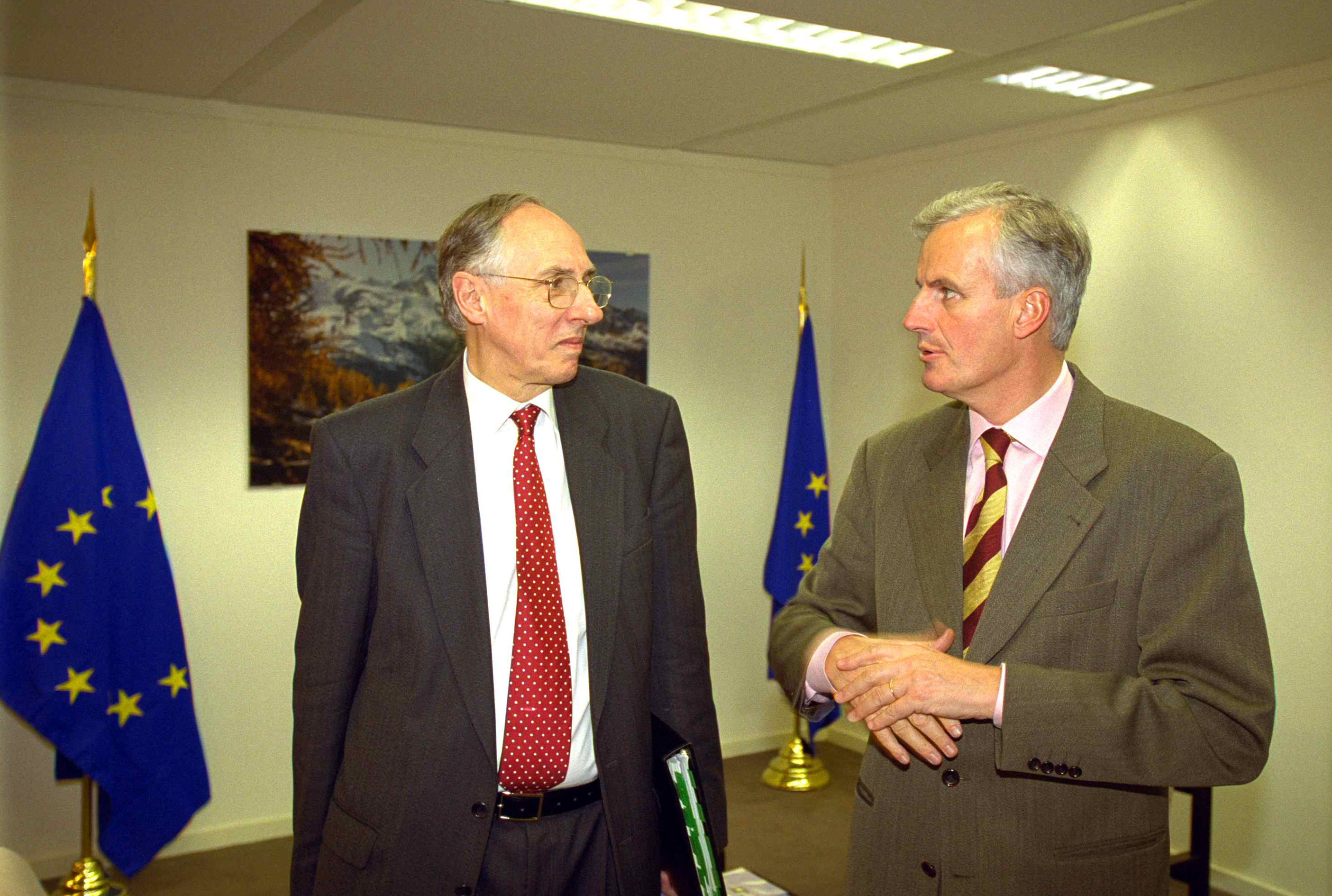
Dewar with Michel Barnier at the European Commission in Brussels, October 1999

The introduction in Scotland of the reformed examinations system in 2000 was criticised in the press and by the Government after a series of administrative and computer errors led to several thousand incorrect Higher and Intermediate certificates being sent out by post. In a statement to the Scottish Parliament, Dewar stated he "greatly regrets" the errors made by the SQA but assured the parliament that he was aware that "many people are working hard to put matters right". Dewar announced that independent consultants had been drafted in by the Scottish Executive to investigate the issue.

The crisis took several months to resolve, and several management figures including the Chief Executive, Ron Tuck, resigned or lost their jobs as a result.

On 15 August 2000, it was announced that several senior officials with the Scottish Qualification Authority (SQA) would be facing disciplinary action as a result of the error. BBC News suggested that Chief Executive Ron Tuck and the Minister for Education Sam Galbraith were "kept in the dark" about the problems. It had been announced that concerns were raised months prior to the error being made that exam results would not be ready when expected but assurances continued to be provided that results would be issued on time and when expected. Bill Morton became the new Chief Executive of the SQA, the organisations third in only five days, and upon his appointment said that the reassessing of exam results was his priority and that of the SQA.

=== International relations and visits ===
| # | Country | Areas visited | Dates | Details |
|---|---|---|---|---|
| 1 | Belgium | Brussels | October 10–13, 1999 | Scotland Week events, as well as addressing the Democratic renewal seminar |
| 2 | Ireland | Dublin | October 29, 1999 | Meeting with the Taoiseach |
| 3 | Netherlands | | December 8, 1999 | Gave the William and Mary lecture and met with the Dutch Justice Minister |
| 4 | Japan | | April 10 – 14, 2000 | Inward Investment visit |
| 5 | Ireland | Dublin | September 29, 2000 | Delivered speech to the Irish-Scottish Academic Initiative |

== Personal life ==
Dewar was an atheist who while "sceptical of religion" treated religious beliefs with "bemused tolerance" and "gracious respect". His political style in relation to religion was characterised as one of "quiet, non-interfering, practical secularism"; his political rival Alex Salmond credits this with enabling the "Time for Reflection" system at Holyrood, implemented as an alternative to the Westminster parliamentary prayers model.

On 20 July 1964, Dewar married Alison Mary McNair, with whom he had two children: a daughter, Marion, and a son, Ian. In 1972, McNair separated from Dewar and entered a relationship with the then Derry Irvine, a prominent Scottish barrister in London. Dewar and his wife divorced in 1973, and he never remarried. Dewar and Lord Irvine of Lairg never reconciled, even though they later served in the same Cabinet from May 1997 until 1999.

In September 2009, Dennis Canavan said Dewar reacted callously when Canavan's son was diagnosed with skin cancer in 1989. The disease eventually killed him. Canavan said Dewar remarked, "Oh no! That's all we need. He was mad enough before but I shudder to think what he'll be like now."

Dewar amassed a personal fortune in excess of £2,000,000 including public utility shares, antiques and artwork with a value of over £400,000.

== Death and funeral ==
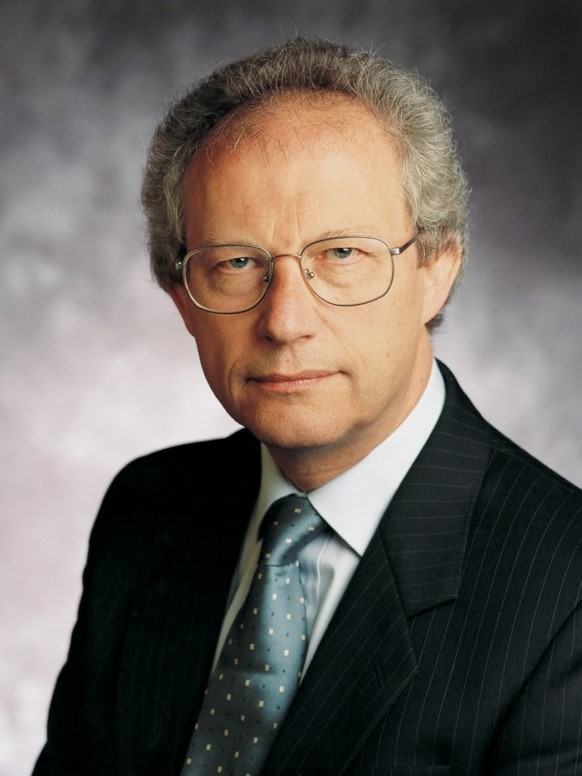
Dewar was succeeded as first minister by his Minister for Enterprise and Lifelong Learning, Henry McLeish on 27 October 2000 following Dewar's death

In early 2000, Dewar was admitted to the Glasgow Royal Infirmary after tests at Stobhill Hospital highlighted "minor irregularity" in his heart. In May 2000, tests revealed he had a faulty aortic valve and he underwent a four-hour heart operation to repair a leaking heart valve. His personal spokesperson, David Whitton, stated "he is as concerned about his health as anyone else would be". Although Dewar was not going under surgery, considerations over whether to cancel foreign trips to Japan were under close watch.

Dewar was forced to take a three-month break and Deputy First Minister Jim Wallace took over as acting first minister. After returning to office, Dewar was described as being "visibly tired" and fears for his health at this stage were officially dismissed following a First Minister's Question Time.

Dewar dealt with the 2000 exam results controversy and the lorry drivers' strike, and attended the Labour Party conference in Brighton, but on 29 September 2000 he told the historian Tom Devine in Dublin that if he did not feel any better, he would have to reappraise the situation in a few months' time.

On 10 October 2000, Dewar sustained a seemingly harmless fall outside his official residence at Bute House following a meeting of the Scottish Cabinet. He seemed fine at first, but later that day suffered a massive brain haemorrhage which was possibly triggered by the anticoagulant medication he was taking following his heart surgery. At 7pm, five hours after his fall, Dewar was admitted to the Western General Hospital in Edinburgh after his condition rapidly deteriorated. By 9pm, he was put on a life-support machine in the hospital's intensive care unit. Dewar's condition worsened and he failed to regain consciousness. On 11 October at 12:18pm, after his children gave permission for his life support to be switched off, Dewar was officially pronounced dead, aged 63.

=== Funeral ===
Dewar's funeral service was held at Glasgow Cathedral, he was cremated on 18 October 2000 and his ashes were scattered at Lochgilphead in Argyll.

=== Guests ===
==== Royal family ====
- The Duke of Rothesay

==== Heads of government ====
- Tony Blair, Prime Minister of the United Kingdom, and Cherie Blair
- Jim Wallace, Acting First Minister of Scotland
- Bertie Ahern, Taoiseach (Irish Prime Minister)
- David Trimble, First Minister of Northern Ireland
- Rhodri Morgan, First Secretary of Wales

==== Politicians ====
- Members of the Scottish Executive Cabinet, including;
  - Wendy Alexander, Minister for Communities
  - Henry McLeish, Minister for Enterprise and Lifelong Learning
- Members of the Cabinet of the United Kingdom, including;
  - Gordon Brown, Chancellor of the Exchequer, and Sarah Brown
  - Jack Straw, Home Secretary
- John Swinney, Leader of the Scottish National Party
- Charles Kennedy, Leader of the Liberal Democrats
- Neil Kinnock, Former Leader of the Labour Party
- Menzies Campbell, Liberal Democrats Member of Parliament
- James Douglas-Hamilton, Conservative Member of Parliament

==== Other dignitaries ====
- Ruth Wishart, Broadcaster and friend
- Lord Robertson, Secretary General of NATO
- Alastair Campbell, Downing Street Press Secretary
- Lord Hardie, Senator of the College of Justice
- John Monks, General Secretary of the Trades Union Congress (TUC)

=== Reactions and aftermath ===
Dewar's death came as a shock to Scotland. The UK Foreign Secretary described his death as "a tragedy for Donald and a tragedy for Scotland." Henry McLeish said: "this is a day of enormous sadness for Scotland and for me personally. Donald was devolution. The architect of the most successful constitutional change this century."

"Although he has become something of a political legend, Donald would have abhorred any attempt to turn him into some kind of secular saint. He would have been horrified at a Diana-style out-pouring of synthetic grief at his untimely death." — Iain Macwhirter, Sunday Herald, 15 October 2000.

Glasgow University contemporary Menzies Campbell said: "Donald Dewar's death has left an aching void in the hearts of his friends and the whole of Scotland. It will be a long time before we see his like again".

Dewar was succeeded by Henry McLeish as First Minister.

== Legacy ==
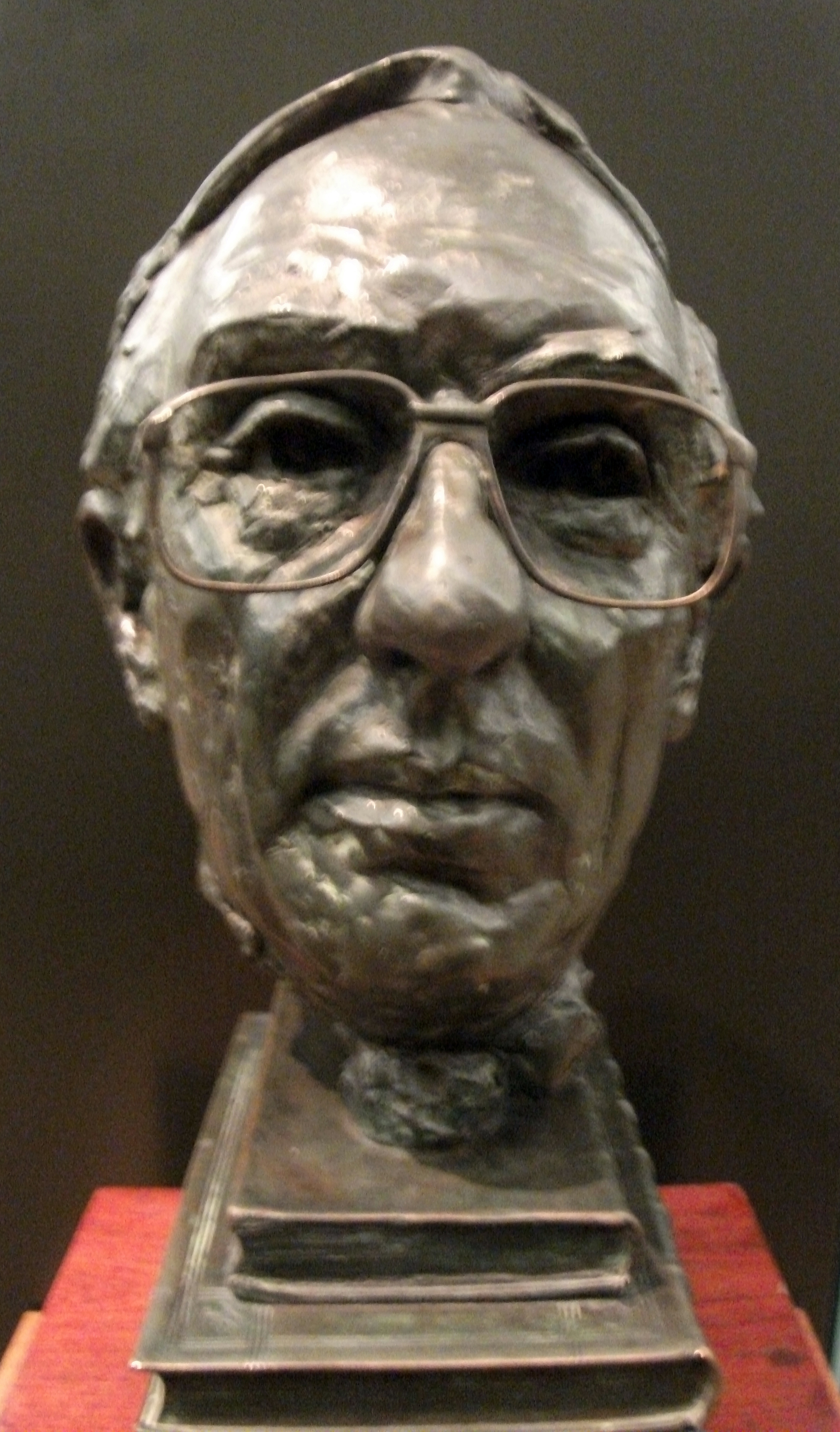
Bust of Donald Dewar by Archie Forrest in the Kelvingrove Art Gallery and Museum, Glasgow

Dewar's commitment to re-establishing the Scottish Parliament and his tireless work on the Scotland Act 1998 has led to his epithet the "Father of the Nation" and the "Father of Devolution". His advocacy for Scottish devolution began in the 1960s, at a time when devolution was fairly unpopular among Labour politicians. However, he persevered to gain support from all parties. Although Dewar did not associate with Scottish nationalism or support attempts for independence, he was a "great unionist" and saw the new Parliament as a "journey not a destination", which left many Labour supporters questioning devolution. His leadership prioritised semi-proportional representation for Scottish parliamentary elections. At the time, many thought this, and devolution, would "end the Scottish National Party's success". However, in the late-2000s Labour's popularity plummeted in Scotland while the SNP's popularity grew rapidly.

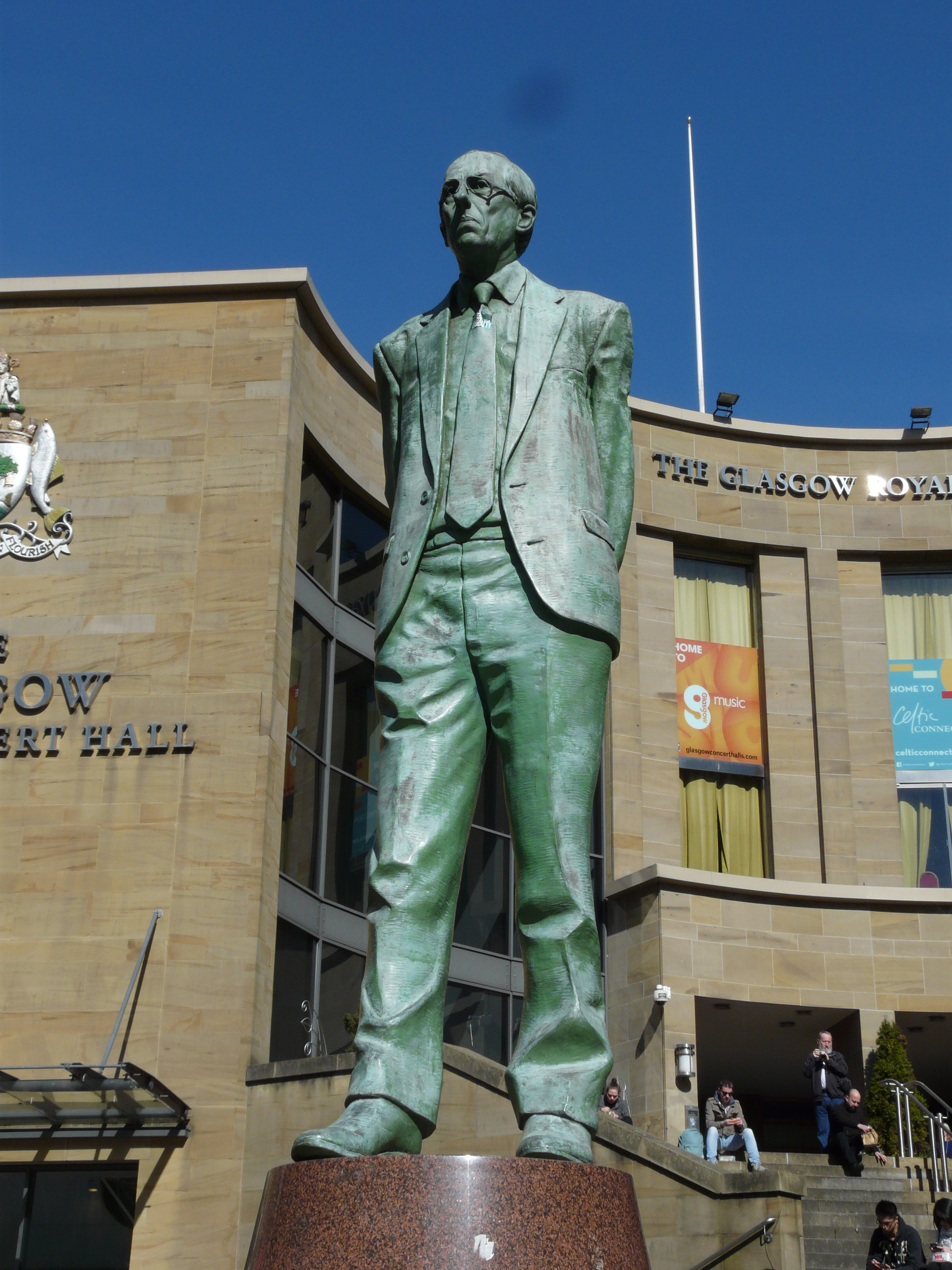
In 2002, a nine-foot (2.7 m) bronze statue of Dewar was erected outside Glasgow's Royal Concert Hall in a ceremony attended by then-Prime Minister Tony Blair, and other Scottish politicians.

Dewar received nicknames such as "Donald Dour" for his stiff, matter-of-fact tone and "The Gannet" due to his large appetite.

In May 2002, then Prime Minister Tony Blair unveiled a statue of Dewar at the top of Glasgow's Buchanan Street. In keeping with his famously unkempt appearance, it showed Dewar wearing a slightly crumpled jacket.

The statue was taken down in October 2005 to be cleaned, and was re-erected on a 6-foot (1.8 m) high plinth in December to protect it from vandalism. On the base of the statue was inscribed the opening words of the Scotland Act: "There Shall Be A Scottish Parliament", a phrase to which Dewar himself famously said, "I like that!"

Dewar called the Old Royal High School on Calton Hill in Edinburgh a "nationalist shibboleth", mainly because it had been the proposed site of the Scottish Assembly in the 1979 referendum. Dewar's opposition to the Calton Hill site partly contributed to the selection of the Holyrood site, which proved expensive.

The First ScotRail Class 334 train 334001 was named Donald Dewar in his memory. The "Dewar Arts Award" was created by the Scottish Executive in 2002 dedicated to his memory. This award supports talented young Scottish artists.

After Dewar's death, Glasgow University established a scholarship scheme for students with poorer financial circumstances.

== Sources ==
- Hutcheon, Paul (3 August 2009). "Dewar savaged as 'hypocritical and petty' in Canavan book". The Herald. Glasgow.
- Torrance, David (2006), The Scottish Secretaries, Birlinn
- "Lockerbie Bombing: 10th Anniversary". Edinburgh: Government of the United Kingdom. 22 December 1998.
- "Lawyer in Irvine". Irvine: Usman. 21 December 1999. Archived from the original on 6 July 2016.
- MacAskill, Ewen; Seenan, Gerard (14 May 1999). "PR deal will end councils stranglehold". The Guardian. London.
- "UK Politics – Dewar appointed as first minister". BBC News. 17 May 1999. a.
- "Dewar's statement to Parliament". BBC News. 16 June 1999. b.

Parliament of the United Kingdom
| Preceded by Priscilla Buchan | Member of Parliament for Aberdeen South; 1966–1970 | Succeeded by Iain Sproat |
| Preceded by William Small | Member of Parliament for Glasgow Garscadden; 1978–1997 | Constituency abolished |
| New constituency | Member of Parliament for Glasgow Anniesland; 1997–2000 | Succeeded by John Robertson |
Political offices
| Preceded by Michael Forsyth | Secretary of State for Scotland; 1997–1999 | Succeeded by John Reid |
| New office | First Minister of Scotland; 1999–2000 | Succeeded by Jim Wallace; Acting |
Party political offices
| New office | Leader of the Scottish Labour Party; 1999–2000 | Succeeded by Henry McLeish |
Scottish Parliament
| New parliament Scotland Act 1998 | Member of the Scottish Parliament for Glasgow Anniesland; 1999–2000 | Succeeded by Bill Butler |
