= Jim Roberts (cricketer) =

Scottish cricketer (1933–2021)

Personal information
- Full name: James Brown Roberts
- Born: 11 October 1933; Dundee, Angus, Scotland
- Died: 15 April 2021 (aged 87); Strathaven, Lanarkshire, Scotland
- Batting: Right-handed
- Bowling: Right-arm fast-medium

Domestic team information
- Years: Team
- 1956–1959: Scotland

Career statistics
Competition	First-class
Matches	10
Runs scored	154
Batting average	12.83
100s/50s	–/–
Top score	31*
Balls bowled	1,119
Wickets	13
Bowling average	33.38
5 wickets in innings	–
10 wickets in match	–
Best bowling	3/70
Catches/stumpings	4/–
- Source: Cricinfo, 20 June 2022

James Brown Roberts (11 October 1933 — 15 April 2021) was a Scottish first-class cricketer.

Roberts was born at Dundee in October 1933. He was educated at the Royal High School, Edinburgh. Roberts initially played his club cricket for the East of Scotland, before moving to Clydesdale Cricket Club when he moved to Glasgow for his work in the finance industry. He made his debut for Scotland in first-class cricket against Yorkshire at Hull in 1956, with Roberts playing first-class cricket for Scotland on a further nine occasions to 1959. Playing primarily as a seam bowler, he took 13 wickets at an average of 33.38, with best figures of 3 for 70. As a lower order batsman, he scored 154 runs at an average 12.38, with a highest score of 31 not out. Roberts later had a spell as a national selector for the Scottish cricket team. He died at Strathaven in April 2021.
