= David Fraser (cricketer) =

Scottish cricketer

Personal information
- Full name: David Dempster Fraser
- Born: 9 April 1943 (age 83); Duddingston, Midlothian, Scotland
- Batting: Right-handed
- Bowling: Right-arm fast-medium

Domestic team information
- Years: Team
- 1967–1969: Scotland

Career statistics
Competition	First-class
Matches	4
Runs scored	0
Batting average	–
100s/50s	–/–
Top score	0*
Balls bowled	630
Wickets	8
Bowling average	45.37
5 wickets in innings	–
10 wickets in match	–
Best bowling	3/29
Catches/stumpings	1/–
- Source: Cricinfo, 27 October 2022

David Dempster Fraser (born 9 April 1943) is a Scottish former first-class cricketer.

== Early life and education ==
Fraser was born in April 1943 at Duddingston, Midlothian. He was educated at the Royal High School, Edinburgh. A club cricketer for Royal High School Former Pupils, Fraser made his debut in first-class cricket for Scotland against the Marylebone Cricket Club at Glasgow in 1967.

== Achievements ==
He made three further first-class appearances for Scotland, against Warwickshire at Edgbaston on their 1967 tour of England, followed by appearances against Ireland in 1968 and the touring New Zealanders in 1969. Considered one of the best opening bowlers in Scotland, he took 8 wickets with his fast-medium bowling at an average of 45.37, with best figures of 3 for 29. Outside of cricket, he was an accountant by profession.
