= David Addison-Smith =

Scottish cricketer and solicitor

Personal information
- Full name: David Lind Addison-Smith
- Born: 9 January 1873; Edinburgh, Midlothian, Scotland
- Died: 2 November 1937 (aged 64); Leith, Midlothian, Scotland
- Batting: Unknown
- Bowling: Slow left-arm orthodox

Domestic team information
- Years: Team
- 1905: Scotland

Career statistics
Competition	First-class
Matches	1
Runs scored	59
Batting average	29.50
100s/50s	–/–
Top score	45
Balls bowled	102
Wickets	1
Bowling average	108.00
5 wickets in innings	–
10 wickets in match	–
Best bowling	1/91
Catches/stumpings	2/–
- Source: Cricinfo, 5 November 2022

David Addison-Smith (9 January 1873 – 2 November 1937) was a Scottish first-class cricketer and solicitor.

The son of R. Addison-Smith, he was born at Edinburgh in January 1873. He was educated at both the Royal High School of Edinburgh and Craigmount High School. After completing his education, he trained to become a solicitor and was admitted to practice as one in June 1895. He practised as an agent for the poor in civil cases, and later replaced his deceased father as law agent to the City of Edinburgh Council. He was also a partner in the family law firm R. Addison-Smith & Co. A keen cricketer, Addison-Smith played club cricket for Grange. At the turn of the 20th century, he was considered the best all-rounder in Scottish cricket, completing the double of 1,000 runs and 100 wickets in the 1900 season. Having played for Scotland in minor matches since 1892, Addison-Smith played in their inaugural first-class match against the touring Australians at Edinburgh in 1905. Opening the batting twice in the match, he was dismissed for 14 runs in Scotland's first innings by Bill Howell, while in their second innings he was dismissed for 45 runs by Charlie McLeod. With his slow left-arm orthodox bowling, he took the wicket of McLeod in the Australians first innings. Addison-Smith died at Leith in November 1937.
