= Glasgow Scotstoun =

Parliamentary constituency in the United Kingdom, 1950–1974

- Former burgh constituency for the House of Commons
- Subdivisions of Scotland: County of city of Glasgow

1950–1974
- Seats: One
- Created from: Glasgow Hillhead, Glasgow Maryhill and Glasgow Partick
- Replaced by: Glasgow Garscadden

Glasgow Scotstoun was a burgh constituency of the House of Commons of the Parliament of the United Kingdom from 1950 until 1974. It elected one Member of Parliament (MP) using the first-past-the-post voting system.

== Boundaries ==
The Representation of the People Act 1948 provided that the constituency was to consist of "The following wards (as so constituted) of the county of the city of Glasgow, namely, Knightswood, Whiteinch and Yoker."

The Parliamentary Constituencies (Scotland) (Glasgow Scotstoun, Glasgow Hillhead and Glasgow Woodside) Order 1955 (SI 1955/25) redefined the constituency as consisting of "The following wards of the county of the city of Glasgow, namely, Knightswood, Yoker and that part of Whiteinch ward which is not included in the Hillhead constituency."

Glasgow Scotstoun's boundaries were very similar to the post-2005 Glasgow North West Westminster constituency and the post-2011 Glasgow Anniesland Holyrood constituency.

== Members of Parliament ==
Election	Member	Party
1950	Sir Arthur Young, Bt	Conservative
1950 by-election	Sir James Hutchison	Conservative
1959	Willie Small	Labour
Feb 1974	constituency abolished	

== Election results ==
=== Elections in the 1950s ===
General election 1950: Glasgow Scotstoun
Party	Candidate	Votes	%	±%
Unionist	Arthur Young	19,294	46.54	
Labour Co-op	William Bargh	19,055	45.96	
Liberal	William Ferguson	2,023	4.88	
Communist	Robert McIlhone	1,088	2.62	
Majority		239	0.58	
Turnout		41,460	84.61	
Registered electors		49,004		
Unionist win (new seat)				

By-election, 1950: Glasgow Scotstoun
Party	Candidate	Votes	%	±%
Unionist	James Hutchison	18,494	50.88	+4.34
Labour Co-op	William Bargh	17,175	47.25	+1.29
Ind. Labour Party	David Gibson	680	1.87	N/A
Majority		1,319	3.63	+3.04
Turnout		36,349		
Unionist hold		Swing	+1.53	

General election 1951: Glasgow Scotstoun
Party	Candidate	Votes	%	±%
Unionist	James Hutchison	21,497	50.74	+4.20
Labour	John Robertson	20,872	49.26	+3.30
Majority		625	1.48	+0.90
Turnout		42,369	85.05	+0.44
Registered electors		49,814		
Unionist hold		Swing	+0.45	

General election 1955: Glasgow Scotstoun
Party	Candidate	Votes	%	±%
Unionist	James Hutchison	18,654	50.58	−0.16
Labour Co-op	Howell James	18,226	49.42	+0.16
Majority		428	1.58	−0.32
Turnout		36,880	79.53	−5.52
Registered electors		46,370		
Unionist hold		Swing	-0.16	

General election 1959: Glasgow Scotstoun
Party	Candidate	Votes	%	±%
Labour	William Small	24,690	53.66	+4.24
Unionist	James Bias	21,320	46.34	−4.24
Majority		3,370	7.32	N/A
Turnout		46,010	81.75	+2.22
Registered electors		56,278		
Labour gain from Unionist		Swing	+4.24	

=== Elections in the 1960s ===
General election 1964: Glasgow Scotstoun
Party	Candidate	Votes	%	±%
Labour	William Small	27,036	61.60	+7.94
Unionist	Ronald B Anderson	16,856	38.40	−7.94
Majority		10,180	23.20	+15.88
Turnout		43,892	78.63	−3.12
Registered electors		55,819		
Labour hold		Swing	+7.94	

General election 1966: Glasgow Scotstoun
Party	Candidate	Votes	%	±%
Labour	William Small	27,320	61.80	+0.20
Conservative	Anna Douglas	14,493	32.78	−5.62
Communist	Hugh David Boyd	2,395	5.42	New
Majority		12,827	29.02	+5.82
Turnout		44,208	74.33	−4.30
Registered electors		59,478		
Labour hold		Swing	+2.91	

=== Elections in the 1970s ===
General election 1970: Glasgow Scotstoun
Party	Candidate	Votes	%	±%
Labour	William Small	26,492	57.42	−4.38
Conservative	Norman J Mountney	14,487	31.40	−1.38
SNP	Alec Mitchell	4,313	9.35	New
Communist	Hugh David Boyd	846	1.83	−3.59
Majority		12,005	26.02	−3.00
Turnout		46,138	70.35	−3.98
Registered electors		65,586		
Labour hold		Swing	-1.50	
