= West Bromwich by-election =

West Bromwich by-election may refer to one of three parliamentary by-elections held for the British House of Commons constituency of West Bromwich:

- 1941 West Bromwich by-election
- 1963 West Bromwich by-election
- 1973 West Bromwich by-election

See also

- West Bromwich (UK Parliament constituency)
