= Peter Snape =

British politician (1942–2026)

The Right Honourable The Lord Snape
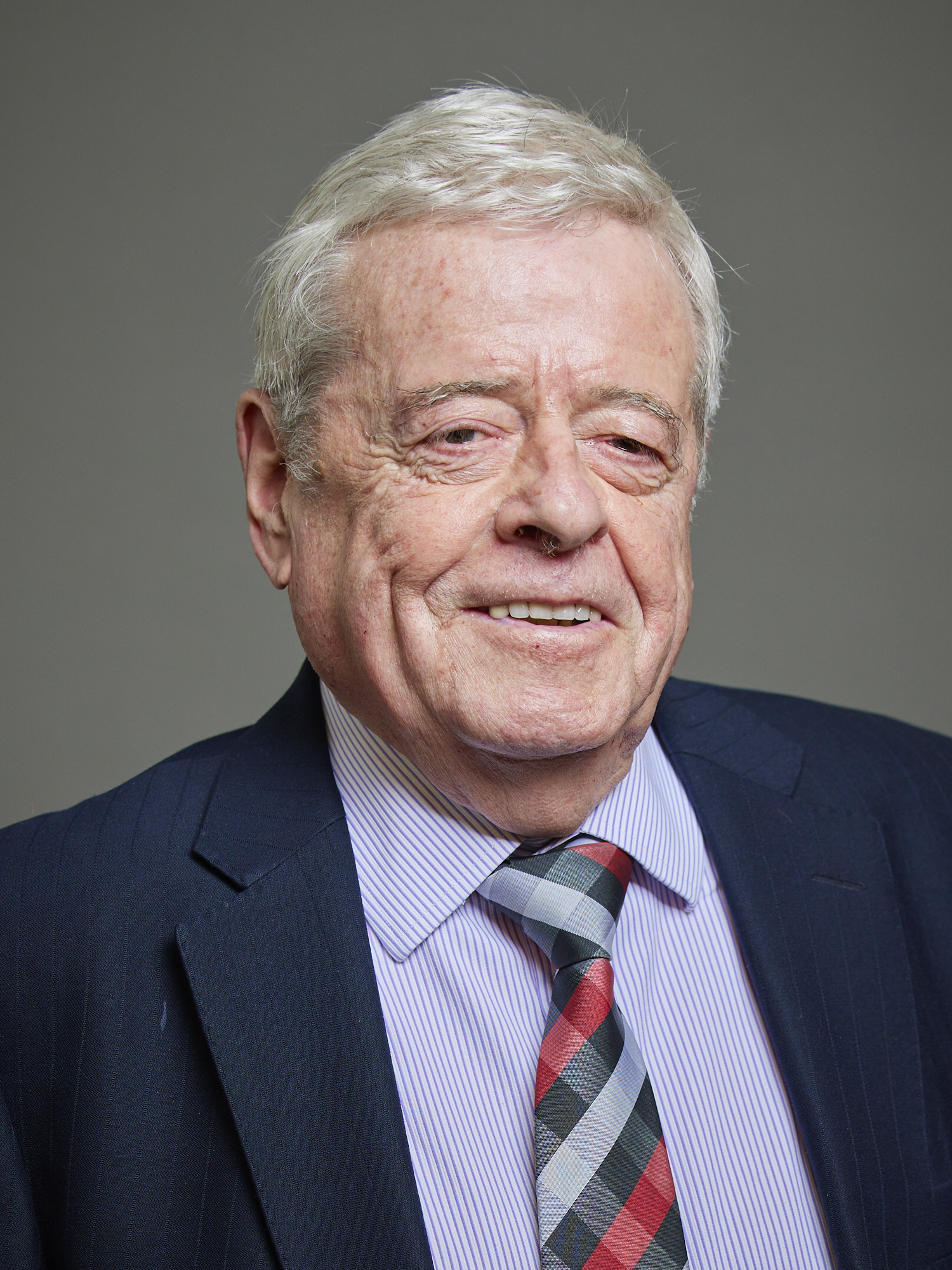
- Official portrait, 2023

Member of the House of Lords
- Lord Temporal
- Life peerage 9 June 2004 – 13 August 2026

Member of Parliament for West Bromwich East
- In office 28 February 1974 – 14 May 2001
- Preceded by: Constituency established
- Succeeded by: Tom Watson

Personal details
- Born: Peter Charles Snape; 12 February 1942 Stockport, England
- Died: 13 August 2026 (aged 84)
- Party: Labour

Peter Charles Snape, Baron Snape (12 February 1942 – 13 August 2026) was a British Labour Party politician. He served as Member of Parliament (MP) for West Bromwich East from February 1974 until he stood down in the 2001 election. Snape was the chairman of his hometown football club, Stockport County, as well as being a major shareholder in the club at the time of his chairmanship. He became vice-chairman of the All-Party Parliamentary Group on Speedway Racing in July 2015.

== Education ==
Snape was educated at a Roman Catholic primary school in Stockport, followed by St Bede's College, Manchester and Dialstone School in Bramhall.

== Career ==
A railwayman by profession, Snape once lived at Greenwood Gardens, Bredbury, in the Borough of Stockport and was the Bredbury and Romiley Urban District councillor representing the Bredbury South ward. He was elected as Labour Member of Parliament for West Bromwich East in 1974, after which he moved to live in Buglawton in Congleton, Cheshire. He retained links with the Bredbury area, serving on multiple occasions as a director of the Stockport County Football Club. He held a number of government posts.

Snape was the member who formally proposed Michael Martin to be the new speaker in 2000. He stood down in the 2001 election and was created a life peer as Baron Snape, of Wednesbury in the County of West Midlands on 9 June 2004.

== Orange juice incident ==
During the 1992 general election campaign, Conservative MP Edwina Currie poured a glass of orange juice over Snape shortly after an edition of the Midlands-based debate show Central Weekend had finished airing. Speaking about the incident later, Currie said, "I just looked at my orange juice, and looked at this man from which this stream of abuse was emanating, and thought 'I know how to shut you up.'"

== Cash for influence allegations ==
In late January 2009, The Sunday Times alleged that Snape was one of four Labour Lords who had agreed to support legislative changes that were favourable to large businesses in exchange for cash. Two of its reporters, posing as lobbyists for a foreign company looking to set up a chain of shops in the UK, approached a range of peers to see if they could be bribed to help the company to obtain an exemption from the Business Rates Supplements Bill. The paper stated that Snape agreed to do so in exchange for a fee of £24,000.

The House of Lords Sub-committee on Lords' Interests was asked to report on the matter. Although the sub-committee found that Snape "expressed a clear willingness to breach the Code of Conduct", the Privileges Committee considered the matter and took further evidence, concluding that he did not "express clear willingness to [act] in return for financial inducement".

They found no reason to doubt Snape's "assertion that his intention to consult the Registrar before taking any steps was genuine", stating that this was pre-empted by the journalists "telephon[ing] him within 24 hours to reveal the sting". However, they felt his conversation with the journalists "demonstrated an inappropriate attitude to the rules governing the conduct of Members" and they therefore invited him to make a personal statement of apology to the House.

The Sunday Times agreed to publish the findings of the Privileges Committee and agreed to pay a "substantial sum" towards Snape's legal costs.

== Personal life ==
Snape was married three times: To Winifred Grimshaw from 1963 to 1980, with whom he had two daughters; to teacher Janet Manley, from 2004 until her death in 2024; and to former Labour MP Lynda Waltho, from 2026 until his death.

Snape died of cancer on 13 August 2026, aged 84.

== Arms ==
Coat of arms of Peter Snape

Adopted
2006
Coronet
Coronet of a Baron
Crest
A Demi Unicorn Azure armed winged and unguled Or supporting with both feet a Grenade Azure fired Or
Escutcheon
Azure within each of two pairs of Endorses Argent a Lozenge throughout all between three Lozenges throughout in fess Or.
Supporters
On either side a Snipe reguardant Azure beaked and legged Or
Motto
LABOR NON NEQUIQUAM
Latin: "NOT WORKING IN VAIN"
Badge
Two Snipe's Heads addorsed their necks in saltire and conjoined in base Azure beaked Or
Symbolism
Baron Snape had a long association with Stockport whose Arms feature three gold lozenges on a blue field. The endorses suggest railway lines with the smaller lozenges being a vehicle thereon. The snipe are clearly a punning allusion on the grantee's name.

== Sources ==
- Leigh Rayment's Historical List of MPs

Parliament of the United Kingdom
New constituency	Member of Parliament for West Bromwich East; February 1974 – 2001	Succeeded by Tom Watson
