= West Bromwich East =

UK Parliament constituency (since 1974)

Coordinates: 52.54°N 1.98°W

- Former borough constituency for the House of Commons
- Boundary of West Bromwich East in West Midlands

- Location of West Midlands within England
- County: West Midlands
- Electorate: 63,008 (December 2010)

1974–2024
- Seats: One
- Created from: West Bromwich
- Replaced by: West Bromwich

West Bromwich East was a constituency (Note: A borough constituency (for the purposes of election expenses and type of returning officer)) in the West Midlands in the House of Commons of the UK Parliament. It was represented from 1974 until 2019 by members of the Labour Party, and by the Conservatives from 2019 until 2024. (Note: As with all constituencies, the constituency elects one Member of Parliament (MP) by the first past the post system of election at least every five years.)

Further to the completion of the 2023 Periodic Review of Westminster constituencies, the seat was abolished and subjected to major boundary changes as a result of the realignment of the boundary between this seat and West Bromwich West, resulting in the loss of the Friar Park and Hateley Heath wards in exchange for the Oldbury and Tividale wards. The replacement seat also includes the Rowley ward from the (to be abolished) constituency of Halesowen and Rowley Regis and will be reformed as West Bromwich, to be first contested at the 2024 general election.

== Constituency profile ==
West Bromwich itself is the main town, with a programme of investment in 21st century apartments similar to nearby Birmingham. Since the recessions of the 1970s and early 1980s, West Bromwich East has suffered from high unemployment, and as a result of the current recession, which began in 2008, unemployment peaked at 14.3%. Only Birmingham, Ladywood nearby had higher unemployment rates in all of Britain.

Workless claimants who were registered jobseekers stood at 7.6% of the population in November 2012; this was higher than the national average of 3.8%, based on a statistical compilation by The Guardian. However, this was lower than in West Bromwich West, with 8.1% of its constituents of working age in receipt of this benefit, which is seen as the lower gauge of the breadth of unemployment.

In the 2016 EU referendum, the constituency voted to leave by 68%, putting it in the top 10% of constituencies in terms of preference for leave.

== Boundaries ==
Map of boundaries 2010-2024

West Bromwich East was one of four constituencies covering the Metropolitan Borough of Sandwell, covering the east and northeast of the borough. It included most of the town of West Bromwich and the part of Great Barr that is in Sandwell.

1974–1983: The County Borough of West Bromwich wards of Charlemont, Friar Park, Great Barr, Hateley Heath, Newton, Sandwell, and Tantany.

1983–1997: The Metropolitan Borough of Sandwell wards of Charlemont, Friar Park, Great Barr, Hateley Heath, Newton, and West Bromwich Central.

1997–2010: The Metropolitan Borough of Sandwell wards of Charlemont, Friar Park, Great Barr, Greets Green and Lyng, Hateley Heath, Newton, and West Bromwich Central.

2010–2024: The Metropolitan Borough of Sandwell wards of Charlemont with Grove Vale, Friar Park, Great Barr with Yew Tree, Greets Green and Lyng, Hateley Heath, Newton, and West Bromwich Central.

The seat formerly shared some wards with West Bromwich West: before 2010 instead placed in the latter seat were a small minority of 1,697 electors in the west of the wards of Friar Park and Greets Green and Lyng, also a negligible portion of Wednesbury South was contained in West Bromwich East. (Note: Consisting of 48 electors at the time of reassessment.)

== Political history ==
The seat was held by the Labour Party for the first several decades of its existence, often with substantial majorities. At the 2019 general election, it fell to the Conservatives for the first time, on a swing in excess of 12%.

== Members of Parliament ==
Election	Member	Party
Feb 1974	Peter Snape	Labour
2001	Tom Watson	Labour
2019	Nicola Richards	Conservative

== Elections ==
=== Elections in the 2010s ===
General election 2019: West Bromwich East
Party	Candidate	Votes	%	±%
Conservative	Nicola Richards	16,804	46.7	▲8.5
Labour	Ibrahim Dogus	15,211	42.3	▼15.7
Brexit Party	Christian Lucas	1,475	4.1	New
Liberal Democrats	Andy Graham	1,313	3.6	▲2.0
Green	Mark Redding	627	1.7	▲0.3
Independent	George Galloway	489	1.4	New
Yeshua	Colin Rankine	56	0.2	New
Majority		1,593	4.4	N/A
Turnout		35,975	57.9	▼3.4
Conservative gain from Labour		Swing	▲12.1	

General election 2017: West Bromwich East
Party	Candidate	Votes	%	±%
Labour	Tom Watson	22,664	58.0	▲7.8
Conservative	Emma Crane	14,951	38.2	▲13.3
Liberal Democrats	Karen Trench	625	1.6	▼0.4
Green	John Macefield	533	1.4	▼0.3
Independent	Colin Rankine	325	0.8	New
Majority		7,713	19.8	▼5.5
Turnout		39,098	61.3	▲2.4
Labour hold		Swing	▼2.8	

General election 2015: West Bromwich East
Party	Candidate	Votes	%	±%
Labour	Tom Watson	18,817	50.2	▲3.7
Conservative	Olivia Seccombe	9,347	24.9	▼4.0
UKIP	Steve Latham	7,949	21.2	▲18.6
Liberal Democrats	Flo Clucas	751	2.0	▼11.2
Green	Barry Lim	628	1.7	New
Majority		9,470	25.3	▲7.7
Turnout		37,492	58.9	▼1.5
Labour hold		Swing	▲3.9	

General election 2010: West Bromwich East
Party	Candidate	Votes	%	±%
Labour	Tom Watson	17,657	46.5	▼9.2
Conservative	Alistair Thompson	10,961	28.9	▲6.1
Liberal Democrats	Ian Garrett	4,993	13.2	▲0.8
BNP	Terry Lewin	2,205	5.8	▼0.6
English Democrat	Mark Cowles	1,150	3.0	New
UKIP	Steve Grey	984	2.6	▲0.9
Majority		6,696	17.6	▼15.2
Turnout		37,950	60.4	▲2.2
Labour hold		Swing	▼7.7	

=== Elections in the 2000s ===
General election 2005: West Bromwich East
Party	Candidate	Votes	%	±%
Labour	Tom Watson	19,741	55.6	▼0.3
Conservative	Rosemary Bromwich	8,089	22.8	▼3.2
Liberal Democrats	Ian Garrett	4,386	12.4	▼1.4
BNP	Carl Butler	2,329	6.6	New
UKIP	Steven Grey	607	1.7	▼0.9
Socialist Labour	Judith Sambrook	200	0.6	▼1.2
Independent	Margaret Macklin	160	0.5	New
Majority		11,652	32.8	▲2.9
Turnout		35,512	58.6	▲5.2
Labour hold		Swing	▲1.5	

General election 2001: West Bromwich East
Party	Candidate	Votes	%	±%
Labour	Tom Watson	18,250	55.9	▼1.3
Conservative	David McFarlane	8,487	26.0	▲1.6
Liberal Democrats	Ian Garrett	4,507	13.8	▼1.1
UKIP	Steven Gray	835	2.6	New
Socialist Labour	Satbir Johal	585	1.8	New
Majority		9,763	29.9	▼2.9
Turnout		32,664	53.4	▼12.0
Labour hold		Swing	▼1.5	

=== Elections in the 1990s ===
General election 1997: West Bromwich East
Party	Candidate	Votes	%	±%
Labour	Peter Snape	23,710	57.2	▲10.0
Conservative	Brian Matsell	10,126	24.4	▼15.3
Liberal Democrats	Martyn G. Smith	6,179	14.9	▲1.8
Referendum	Graham Mulley	1,472	3.5	New
Majority		13,584	32.8	▲26.3
Turnout		41,487	65.4	▼10.3
Labour hold		Swing	▲13.6	

General election 1992: West Bromwich East
Party	Candidate	Votes	%	±%
Labour	Peter Snape	19,913	46.2	▲3.6
Conservative	Crispin Blunt	17,100	39.7	▼0.6
Liberal Democrats	Martyn G. Smith	5,630	13.1	▼4.0
National Front	John Lord	477	1.1	New
Majority		2,813	6.5	▲4.2
Turnout		43,120	75.7	▲2.5
Labour hold		Swing	▲2.1	

=== Elections in the 1980s ===
General election 1987: West Bromwich East
Party	Candidate	Votes	%	±%
Labour	Peter Snape	18,162	42.6	+4.5
Conservative	Roger Woodhouse	17,179	40.3	+2.9
Liberal	Martyn G. Smith	7,268	17.1	−7.4
Majority		983	2.3	+1.6
Turnout		42,609	73.2	+3.0
Labour hold		Swing		

General election 1983: West Bromwich East
Party	Candidate	Votes	%	±%
Labour	Peter Snape	15,894	38.1	−8.9
Conservative	Charles Cole	15,596	37.4	−4.8
Liberal	Martyn G. Smith	10,200	24.5	+16.5
Majority		298	0.7	−4.1
Turnout		41,690	70.2	−0.9
Labour hold		Swing		

=== Elections in the 1970s ===
General election 1979: West Bromwich East
Party	Candidate	Votes	%	±%
Labour	Peter Snape	19,279	47.0	−3.5
Conservative	J Wright	17,308	42.2	+10.8
Liberal	Martyn G. Smith	3,228	7.9	−5.9
National Front	C Allsopp	1,175	2.9	−1.4
Majority		1,971	4.8	−14.3
Turnout		40,990	71.1	+3.5
Labour hold		Swing		

General election October 1974: West Bromwich East
Party	Candidate	Votes	%	±%
Labour	Peter Snape	19,942	50.5	−2.3
Conservative	David Mellor	12,413	31.4	−8.8
Liberal	JPT Hunt	5,442	13.8	New
National Front	G Bowen	1,692	4.3	−2.7
Majority		7,529	19.1	+6.5
Turnout		39,489	67.6	−4.3
Labour hold		Swing		

General election February 1974: West Bromwich East
Party	Candidate	Votes	%	±%
Labour	Peter Snape	21,895	52.8	−2.4
Conservative	DW Bell	16,686	40.2	−4.6
National Front	Martin Webster	2,907	7.0	New
Majority		5,209	12.6	
Turnout		41,488	71.9	
Labour win (new seat)				

== See also ==
- List of parliamentary constituencies in the West Midlands (county)
- Charlemont and Grove Vale
