= Arthur Dugdale =

Arthur Dugdale CMG DSO TD
- Born: 2 February 1869; Burnley, Lancashire, England
- Died: 27 April 1941 (aged 72); Sezincote House, Moreton-in-Marsh, Gloucestershire
- Military career
- Allegiance: United Kingdom
- Branch: British Army
- Rank: Colonel
- Commands: Queen's Own Oxfordshire Hussars
- Conflicts: First World War
- Awards: Distinguished Service Order; Order of St Michael and St George; Territorial Decoration

Colonel Arthur Dugdale CMG DSO TD (2 February 1869 – 27 April 1941) was a British Army officer. He was Commander of the Queen's Own Oxfordshire Hussars during the First World War.

Dugdale was born in Burnley, Lancashire, the son of James Dugdale (1835–1915). He was a first cousin of Conservative MP Thomas Dugdale, 1st Baron Crathorne. When he was 15, James Dugdale purchased the majestic Sezincote House in the Cotswolds. Arthur was educated at Winchester College and at Christ Church, Oxford.

During the First World War, he commanded the Queen's Own Oxfordshire Hussars. He was awarded the Territorial Decoration on 20 June 1913, appointed a Companion of the Order of St Michael and St George in the 1915 Birthday Honours and awarded the Distinguished Service Order in the 1919 New Year Honours.

At Adlestrop, Gloucestershire on 24 July 1895 he married Jessie Stanley Arnold, daughter of Colonel Stanley Arnold CB JP, of Barton House in Barton-on-the-Heath, Warwickshire. They were divorced on 5 June 1899.

In 1904, he married Ethel Innes, (know to the family as "Outoo") eldest daughter of Colonel John Sherston DSO and sister of Brigadier John Reginald Vivian Sherston DSO OBE MC and Geoffrey Sherston. She would become a suffragette. They had a son, John Dugdale, a journalist and Labour politician. His niece through Ethel was the British-Dutch resistance member Door de Graaf.

Dudale died at Sezincote House, aged 71.
