= John Dugdale (Labour politician) =

British newspaper journalist and politician (1905–63)

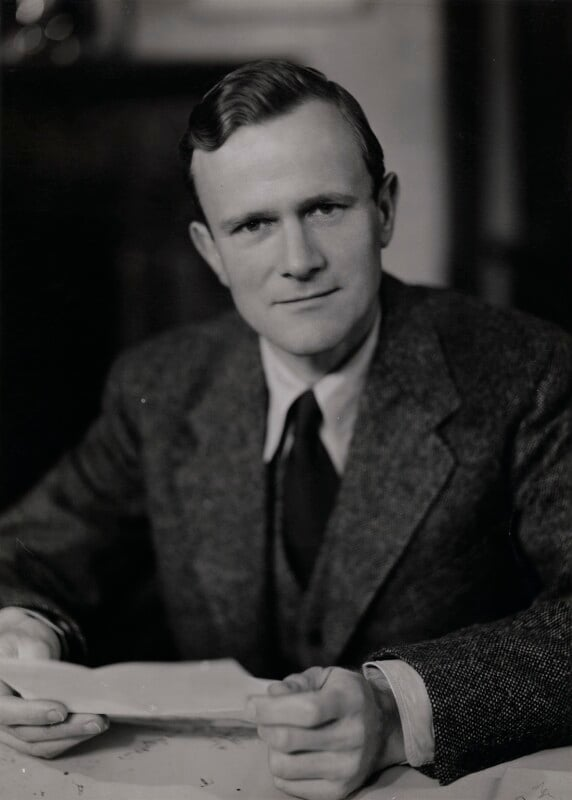
Dugdale in 1947

John Dugdale (16 March 1905 – 12 March 1963) was a British newspaper journalist and politician. Well-connected with the Labour Party establishment, he worked as Private Secretary to Clement Attlee and was appointed a Minister in his post-war government.

== Early career ==
Dugdale was from an upper-class family, the only son of Ethel Innes "Outoo" (née) Sherston and Colonel Arthur Dugdale CMG DSO who was Commander of the Queen's Own Oxfordshire Hussars during the First World War. He was first cousin to Door de Graaf and second cousin of Conservative MP Thomas Dugdale, who was Minister of Agriculture, Fisheries and Food from 1951 to 1954. He was sent to Wellington College, from where he moved to Christ Church, Oxford. On leaving Oxford, Dugdale joined the Diplomatic Service and was stationed in Peking as an attaché in the British embassy.

== Journalism and politics ==
This life did not suit him and Dugdale then went into journalism. He was a correspondent for The Times on the Yangtze River during troubles there in 1930. In the 1931 general election, Dugdale fought the constituency of Leicester South as a Labour Party candidate. In the new Parliament, he was appointed as Parliamentary Private Secretary by Clement Attlee, who had become Deputy Leader of the Labour Party largely by default of being the only former Minister to survive the election.

== Local government ==
He was elected to London County Council in 1934 from Islington South. He enjoyed his time on the LCC and local government in general, becoming vice-president of the Association of Municipal Corporations. At the 1935 general election he tried again to get into Parliament, this time for Cardiff Central, but was again defeated; he fought a byelection in York in 1937. Dugdale married Irene Haverson, granddaughter of George Lansbury, in December 1938.

== Entry to Parliament ==
Dugdale resigned as Attlee's Secretary and enlisted in the Army during the Second World War and was an Officer. He had edited a book of Attlee's speeches called The Road to War which was published in 1940. However, when the Labour Member of Parliament (MP) for West Bromwich Frederick Roberts resigned due to ill health, Dugdale was chosen to follow him, and he was elected unopposed at the by-election in April 1941.

In December 1941, Dugdale was an organiser of a Labour rebellion in the House of Commons over National Service. His group put down an amendment insisting that National Service in industry should happen in conjunction with nationalisation of industries involved in the war effort. The Labour whips did not support the amendment. In 1942 he was part of an all-party group which pressed for wider Sunday opening of cinemas and theatres, decrying the campaigning of the Lord's Day Observance Society. He also took up his interest in China, becoming Secretary of the All-Party Group on China when it was formed in 1943.

== Ministerial Office ==
During the last months of the war, Dugdale was Parliamentary Private Secretary to Clement Attlee. When Attlee formed his government after the 1945 general election, Dugdale was made Parliamentary and Financial Secretary to the Admiralty. The job involved a great deal of travelling to visit Royal Navy bases which were scattered across the world. His health was not always good during his time in office. In the 1949 Birthday Honours he was appointed to the Privy Council.

== Colonial office ==
In a reshuffle in February 1950, Dugdale was moved to be Minister of State at the Colonial Office. He endorsed the fight against communist insurgents in the Federation of Malaya. In the summer of 1950 he went on a tour of East Africa, including the Tanganyika groundnut scheme.

== Opposition spokesman ==
When the Labour Party went into opposition in 1951, Dugdale remained a spokesperson on Colonial affairs. He opposed the plan to unite Northern Rhodesia, Southern Rhodesia and Nyasaland. In 1956 he asked Parliamentary questions on the mysterious death of Lionel Crabb, who had disappeared while apparently on an intelligence mission to spy on a visiting Soviet warship. In 1958 Dugdale stood for the Shadow Cabinet, but finished bottom of the poll with only 36 votes. He kept up travelling, including a visit to Uganda in 1959, during which he opposed the government's policy of reserving seats in the Uganda Parliament for the Indian minority after independence, which he blamed for civil unrest in the colony.

== Campaigns ==
After the 1959 general election, Dugdale took issue with those who claimed that a pledge of nationalisation had cost votes for the Labour Party. In late 1959 he was one of the first to call for a cricket boycott on South Africa until the policy of apartheid was ended. When he won a place in the ballot for Private Members' Bills in November 1960, he introduced a Bill to make the conditions of farm animals more humane, although it was unsuccessful.

Dugdale's deep belief in the Commonwealth led him to oppose the Macmillan government's application to join the European Economic Community. He demanded that Macmillan accept the resignation of the First Lord of the Admiralty over the Vassall spy case. While speaking on the Defence Estimates in the House of Commons on 11 March 1963, Dugdale was taken ill and rushed to hospital; he died during the night.

He had some degree of deafness or hearing loss after childhood illness, and in 1959 he co-founded the Commonwealth Society for the Deaf, now Sound Seekers with Lady Edith Templer, wife of Gerald Templer.

Parliament of the United Kingdom
Preceded by Frederick Roberts	Member of Parliament for West Bromwich; 1941 – 1963	Succeeded by Maurice Foley
Political offices
Preceded by Sir Victor Warrender	Parliamentary and Financial Secretary to the Admiralty; 1945 – 1950	Succeeded by James Callaghan
Preceded by The Earl of Listowel	Minister of State at the Colonial Office; 1950–1951	Succeeded by Alan Lennox-Boyd
