= Ethel Margery Templer =

Ethel Margery Davie, Lady Templer (23 July 1904 – 24 March 1997) was a lieutenant colonel in the St John Ambulance Brigade during World War II, the founder of Lady Templer Hospital in Malaya and active during the Malaya Emergency. She was the wife of Sir Gerald Templer, and when he was British High Commissioner of Malaysia, she was known as the "First Lady of Malaysia".

== Biography ==
Ethel Margery Davie was born in Devon to Charles Davie, a retired solicitor, and his wife Beatrice, on 23 July 1904. An intelligent child, Davies' father reportedly removed her from school after the headmistress suggested she take an entrance exam to Oxford. She first met Gerald Templar when staying with her grandparents in 1920. The two were engaged in 1924, married on 8 September 1926, and, according to her obituary in The Times, for many years she "made a successful career as an officer's wife, resolutely in the background and supportive to a man who could at times be prickly". Templer ran social clubs. During the Second World War, she lived in Woodford, Wiltshire and was a lieutenant-colonel in the St John Ambulance Brigade. They would have a daughter in 1934 and a son in 1945.

In Malay with her husband, Templer learned to speak and broadcast the Malay language, and founded the Lady Templer Hospital. The hospital began treating solely tuberculosis, and was later made a general hospital. With the help of Margaret Herbison, Templer founded a Women's Institute-like organisation. During the Malayan Emergency, communists reportedly warned against Templer attempting to trick women into joining her organisation, saying "This woman bandit is cunning."

She was later involved with the Commonwealth Society for the Deaf and the SSAFA. Templer died on 24 March 1997, aged 93. A biographer of Gerald Templer wrote that "Peggie had a strong will and a determination to achieve what she wanted which would sometimes show through the very genuine sympathy and warmth which she constantly conveyed to all around her."
