= Ernest Spencer =

British politician

Spencer in 1895.

Sir James Ernest Spencer DL JP (5 May 1848 – 29 June 1937) was a British Conservative politician and member of parliament 1886–1906.

== Biography ==
Spencer was born in 1848, the youngest son of John Spencer, iron master, of Phoenix House, West Bromwich. He was educated privately, and was a chairman of the family company, J. E. and S. Spencer Ltd, and a director of several other companies, including Kelly's Directories Ltd. In 1884 he was called to the bar by the Middle Temple, and joined the Oxford Circuit. From 1892 to 1914 he served as counsel to the Austro-Hungarian consulate. He was a justice of the peace (JP) and a deputy lieutenant (DL) for Staffordshire. He was a member of the British Beekeepers Association in 1915 and became president of the organisation in 1932.

In politics, he unsuccessfully contested the West Bromwich constituency in the general election in November 1885, but was elected as a member of parliament in the election the following year. He served as MP for West Bromwich from 1886 until he retired in the 1906 election.

For his services to politics he was appointed a knight Bachelor in the November 1901 Birthday Honours list, and received the knighthood from King Edward VII on 10 December 1901.

He died at his home, at Oxshott, on 29 June 1937.

== Family ==
Spencer married, in 1886, Helen Williamson, daughter of Thomas Williamson, of the Bombay Civil Service. Lady Spencer died in 1928.

Parliament of the United Kingdom
Preceded by John Horton Blades	Member of Parliament for West Bromwich; 1886–1906	Succeeded by Alfred Hazel
