= Lady Elizabeth Basset =

English author and courtier (1908–2000)

Lady Elizabeth Basset DCVO
- Born: 5 March 1908; Knightsbridge, London
- Died: 30 November 2000 (age 92); London, England, UK
- Title: Woman of the Bedchamber (1959-81)
- Spouse: Ronald Lambart Basset (m. 1931)
- Children: Bryan Ronald, Peter Francis

Lady Elizabeth Basset DCVO (née Legge; 5 March 1908 – 30 November 2000) was an English author and courtier.

== Biography ==
Basset was born at 8 Prince's Gate, Knightsbridge, the second daughter of the 7th Earl of Dartmouth and Lady Ruperta Wynn-Carrington, daughter of the Marquess of Lincolnshire. She was educated at home.

On 31 October 1931, she married Ronald Lambert Basset (1898–1972), senior representative of the ancient Basset family of Tehidy in Cornwall. They had two children, industrialist Bryan Ronald Basset CBE (1932–2010) and Peter Francis Basset (1935–1954). During the Second World War, she ran a small farm in North Devon.

In 1959, Queen Elizabeth the Queen Mother, asked Basset to be a Woman of the Bedchamber. She held that position until 1981. She was active as a Lady-in-Waiting from 1982 to 1993. She retired at the age of 85.

She was appointed a Commander of the Royal Victorian Order in 1976 and a dame of the same order in 1989.

Lady Elizabeth authored a devotional book, Love Is My Meaning, and four anthologies.

Lady Elizabeth Basset died in London in 2000, aged 92.

== Bibliography ==
- Basset, Elizabeth (1973). Love is My Meaning: An Anthology of Assurance (2nd ed.). London: Darton, Longman and Todd. ISBN 9780232517033. OCLC 13793386.
- ———————— (1978). Each in His Prison: An Anthology. London: S.P.C.K. ISBN 9780281036004. OCLC 5355238.
- ———————— (1981). The Bridge is Love: An Anthology of Hope. London: Darton, Longman, and Todd. ISBN 9780232515411. OCLC 9306333.
- ———————— (1994). Interpreted by Love: An Anthology of Praise. London: Darton, Longman & Todd. ISBN 9780232520729. OCLC 31609899.
- ———————— (1999). Beyond the Blue Mountains: Wisdom and Compassion on Living and Dying; An Anthology. London: Medio Media. ISBN 9780966694130. OCLC 41157529.
