= The Railwaymen =

The Railwaymen is the nickname of multiple association football clubs:

- CFR Cluj, a Romanian professional football club
- Crewe Alexandra F.C., an English professional football club
- Dundalk F.C., an Irish professional football club
- Leigh Genesis F.C., an English amateur football club
- FC Rapid București, a Romanian professional football club
- Shildon A.F.C., an English amateur football club

== See also ==
- The Railway Man
