= Alfred Hazel =

British politician (1869–1944)

Alfred Hazel

Alfred Ernest William Hazel CBE KC MP (20 February 1869 – 20 August 1944) was a British Liberal Party Member of Parliament (MP) and legal academic at the University of Oxford.

== Background ==
He was educated at West Bromwich Wesleyan School and King Edward's School, Birmingham before going to study Classics and Law at Jesus College, Oxford. He graduated with first-class honours and won the Eldon Law Scholarship. He was called to the bar by Lincoln's Inn in 1898, and was appointed to a Fellowship in Law at Jesus College in the same year.

== Politics ==
He was MP for West Bromwich between 1906 (when the Liberal Party won a large majority) and January 1910 (when the Liberal Party lost 125 seats, including West Bromwich).

General election 1906: West Bromwich
Party	Candidate	Votes	%	±%
Liberal	Alfred Ernest William Hazel	5,475	56.2	n/a
Conservative	Viscount Lewisham	4,259	43.8	n/a
Majority		1,216	12.4	n/a
Turnout			90.8	n/a
Liberal gain from Conservative		Swing	n/a	

General election January 1910: West Bromwich
Party	Candidate	Votes	%	±%
Conservative	Viscount Lewisham	5,672	53.5	
Liberal	Alfred Ernest William Hazel	4,937	46.5	
Majority		735	7.6	
Turnout				
Conservative hold		Swing		

General election December 1910: West Bromwich
Party	Candidate	Votes	%	±%
Conservative	Viscount Lewisham	5,010	50.0	
Liberal	Alfred Ernest William Hazel	5,008	50.0	
Majority		2	0.0	
Turnout			88.7	
Conservative hold		Swing		

He was re-selected as prospective Liberal candidate for West Bromwich and was to fight a general election expected in 1914/15 which was postponed due to the outbreak of war. When the election eventually took place in 1918, the partners in the Coalition Government decided to endorse his Unionist opponent so he withdrew from the contest. He did not stand for parliament again.

== Career outside politics ==
He was Reader in Constitutional Law at the Inns of Court from 1910 to 1926. In 1915, he also became University Lecturer on Criminal Law and the Law of Evidence at Oxford, a position he held until 1922, when he was appointed All Souls Reader in English Law (until 1933).

Between 1915 and 1919, he was Deputy Controller in the Priority Department of the Ministry of Munitions. He was appointed a Commander of the Order of the British Empire in the 1918 New Year Honours for his efforts during the First World War. In 1925, he was appointed Principal of Jesus College, and in 1930 he was appointed to the King's Counsel. He was also Recorder of Burton-on-Trent between 1912 and 1938. Some accommodation for students at Jesus College is now named after Hazel.

== Personal life ==
In 1919, he married Ethel Percival, with whom he had one son. He died in Oxford in 1944.

Parliament of the United Kingdom
Preceded by Sir James Ernest Spencer	Member of Parliament for West Bromwich; 1906–1910	Succeeded by Viscount Lewisham
