= John Horton Blades =

English politician (1841–1916)

John Horton Blades (1841–1916) was an English brick maker and Liberal politician who sat in the House of Commons from 1885 to 1886.

Blades was born at West Bromwich, the son of Brownlow W. Blades. He was a manufacturer of blue-bricks and sanitary pipes at West Bromwich. He was an alderman of West Bromwich and a temperance campaigner, being a trustee of the Gospel Blue Ribbon Mission.

Blades was elected Member of Parliament (MP) for West Bromwich at the 1885 general election, but did not defend the seat at the 1886 general election. He made no contributions during his year in parliament.

Blades lived at Oakhurst, West Bromwich and died at West Bromwich at the age of 75.

Blades married Sarah Collumbell of Derby in 1865.

Parliament of the United Kingdom
New constituency	Member of Parliament for West Bromwich; 1885 – 1886	Succeeded by James Ernest Spencer
