= Maurice Foley (politician) =

British politician (1925–2002)

Maurice Anthony Foley (9 October 1925 – 8 February 2002) was a British Labour Party politician. Born in Durham and educated at a local grammar school, he joined the Transport and General Workers' Union, and stood unsuccessfully for the Labour Party in Bedford at the 1959 general election. He was elected as Member of Parliament (MP) for West Bromwich at a by-election in 1963. From 1967 to 1968, he was Under-Secretary of State for the Navy. Before that, whilst serving as a junior government minister with special responsibility for immigrants, he featured in the launch (broadcast on 10 October 1965) of a new BBC TV programme for immigrants, titled Apna Hi Ghar Samajhiye (meaning "Make Yourself at Home"). From 1970 to 1973, he was an Opposition Spokesman on Foreign Affairs.

Foley resigned his seat in 1973, having been appointed as Deputy Director General for Development of the European Commission. At the resulting by-election he was succeeded as MP by a future Speaker of the House of Commons, Betty Boothroyd.

Parliament of the United Kingdom
Preceded by John Dugdale	Member of Parliament for West Bromwich; 1963 – 1973	Succeeded by Betty Boothroyd
