= William Legge, 7th Earl of Dartmouth =

British peer and Conservative politician (1881–1958)

Lieutenant-Colonel The Right Honourable The Earl of Dartmouth GCVO TD
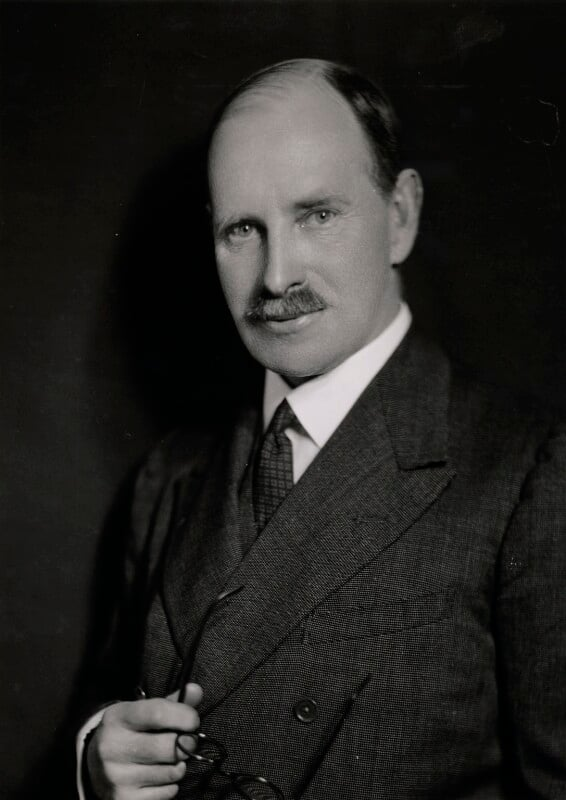
- Dartmouth in the 1930s

Member of the House of Lords
- Lord Temporal
- In office 11 March 1936 – 28 February 1958
- Preceded by: The 6th Earl of Dartmouth
- Succeeded by: The 8th Earl of Dartmouth

Member of Parliament for West Bromwich
- In office January 1910 – 1918
- Preceded by: Alfred Hazel
- Succeeded by: Frederick Roberts

Personal details
- Born: William Legge; 22 February 1881
- Died: 28 February 1958 (aged 77); Bilston, Staffordshire, England
- Spouse: Lady Ruperta Wynn-Carington (m. 1905)
- Children: Lady Mary Cecilia Findlay; Lady Elizabeth Basset; Lady Diana Matthews; William Legge, Viscount Lewisham; Lady Barbara Kwiatkowski; Josceline Chichester, Marchioness of Donegall
- Parent(s): William Legge, 6th Earl of Dartmouth; Lady Mary Coke

Lieutenant-Colonel William Legge, 7th Earl of Dartmouth (22 February 1881 – 28 February 1958), styled Viscount Lewisham between 1891 and 1936, was a British hereditary peer and Conservative politician, who was Acting Lord Great Chamberlain 1928–1936.

== Background ==
Legge was the eldest son of the 6th Earl of Dartmouth, and his wife, Lady Mary (née Coke), daughter of the 2nd Earl of Leicester. He was educated at Eton and Christ Church, Oxford. He was commissioned as a Second lieutenant in the Staffordshire Yeomanry (Queen's Own Royal Regiment) on 11 June 1902.

== Political and military career ==
In 1907, he joined the London County Council and entered Parliament in 1910 as Member of Parliament for West Bromwich, a seat he held until 1918. While a lieutenant in the Staffordshire Yeomanry, he was appointed honorary colonel of the 7th Battalion, Duke of Wellington's Regiment, on 27 April 1910. On 23 April 1912, he was promoted to captain in the Staffordshire Yeomanry, and received a temporary promotion to major on 1 November 1914. He served with the Staffordshire Yeomanry in the Sinai and Palestine Campaign in the First World War, for which he was awarded the Territorial Decoration, and made an officer of the Order of the Nile. On 13 December 1917, he was promoted acting lieutenant-colonel while commanding a Yeomanry regiment. He ceased command on 24 June 1918 and reverted to the rank of major. On 22 November 1922, he resigned his honorary colonelcy. Lewisham was appointed a deputy lieutenant of Staffordshire on 18 November 1920. He was High Bailiff of Westminster from 1930 to 1942 and was made a GCVO for his services on 1 January 1934. Legge inherited his father's titles in 1936.

== Family ==
Viscount Lewisham, as he was then styled, married Lady Ruperta Wynn-Carington, third daughter of Charles Wynn-Carington, 1st Marquess of Lincolnshire, on 7 December 1905. They had six children:

- Lady Mary Cecilia Legge (1906–2003), married Noel Findlay.
- Lady Elizabeth Legge (1908–2000), married Ronald Lambert Basset.
- Lady Diana Legge (1910–1970), married (1) Hon. John Hamilton-Russell, son of 9th Viscount Boyne (killed 1943); (2) Adrian Matthews.
- William Legge, Viscount Lewisham (1913–1942), killed at the Second Battle of El Alamein.
- Lady Barbara Legge (1916–2013), married Adam Kwiatkowski.
- Lady Josceline Gabrielle Legge (1918–1995), married Hon. Dermot Chichester, who would later accede to the titles Baron Templemore and Marquess of Donegall.

Following the death of his father-in-law in 1928, Lord Dartmouth acted as Deputy Lord Great Chamberlain until the death of George V in 1936. Lord Dartmouth died in February 1958, aged 77. As he had no surviving male issue, he was succeeded by his younger brother, Humphry Legge.

== Arms ==

Parliament of the United Kingdom
Preceded by Alfred Hazel	Member of Parliament for West Bromwich; January 1910 – 1918	Succeeded by Frederick Roberts
Court offices
Preceded by The Marquess of Lincolnshire	Lord Great Chamberlain acting 1928–1936	Succeeded by The Marquess of Cholmondeley
Honorary titles
Preceded by The Lord Muir Mackenzie	High Bailiff of Westminster; 1930–1942	Succeeded by Sir Henry Willink
Peerage of Great Britain
Preceded by William Legge	Earl of Dartmouth; 1936–1958; Member of the House of Lords (1936–1958)	Succeeded by Humphry Legge
Peerage of England
Preceded by William Legge	Baron Dartmouth; 1936–1958	Succeeded by Humphry Legge
