= Alexander Ramsay (West Bromwich MP) =

British Conservative Party politician (1887–1969)

Alexander Ramsay (12 January 1887 – 17 October 1969) was a British Conservative Party politician.

He was elected at the 1931 general election as Member of Parliament (MP) for West Bromwich, defeating the sitting Labour MP Frederick Roberts. Ramsay did not defend the seat at the 1935 general election (when it was regained by Roberts), and did not stand for Parliament again.

Parliament of the United Kingdom
Preceded by Frederick Roberts	Member of Parliament for West Bromwich; 1931 – 1935	Succeeded by Frederick Roberts
