= Newton, West Midlands =

Ward in England

Newton is a ward in Sandwell, West Midlands, England. On the eastern bank of the River Tame, it is currently represented by 3 Labour Party councillors, who sit on the Metropolitan Borough Council.

== Politics ==
Newton is part of the West Bromwich parliamentary constituency for elections to the House of Commons. The local MP is currently Sarah Coombes from the Labour Party.
