= Frederick Roberts (British politician) =

British Labour MP (1876–1941)

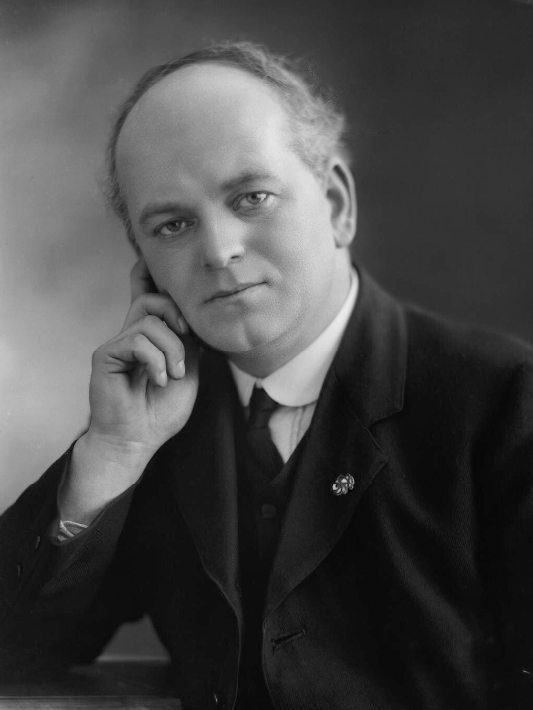
- Roberts in 1924

Member of Parliament
- Constituency: West Bromwich
- In office 1918–1931
- In office 1935–1945

Personal details
- Born: 2 July 1876
- Died: 23 October 1941 (aged 65)
- Party: Labour

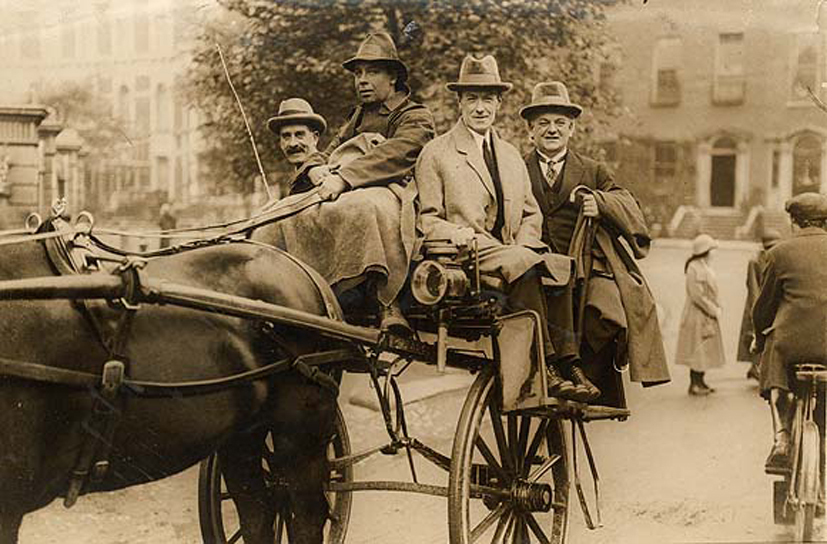
Roberts on the far right, holding the umbrella.

Frederick Owen Roberts (2 July 1876 – 23 October 1941) was a Labour Party politician in the United Kingdom.

Roberts worked as a compositor and became active in the Typographical Association, serving on its executive council. He was also active in the Labour Party, and served on its National Executive Committee for many years.

He was elected at the 1918 general election as member of parliament (MP) for West Bromwich, defeating the sitting Conservative MP Viscount Lewisham. He held the seat until the Conservatives regained it in 1931, but was re-elected at the 1935 general election.

He was sworn as a Privy Councillor in 1924, when he was appointed as Minister of Pensions in Ramsay MacDonald's First Labour Government. He held the same post in the 1929–1931 Labour Government.

He resigned his seat on 3 April 1941, and died later that year, aged 65.

== Notes ==
Parliament of the United Kingdom
Preceded by Viscount Lewisham	Member of Parliament for West Bromwich; 1918–1931	Succeeded by Alexander Ramsay
Preceded by Alexander Ramsay	Member of Parliament for West Bromwich; 1935–1941	Succeeded by John Dugdale
Political offices
Preceded by George Tryon	Minister of Pensions; 1924	Succeeded by George Tryon
Preceded by George Tryon	Minister of Pensions; 1929–1931	Succeeded by George Tryon
Party political offices
Preceded by Robert Williams	Chair of the Labour Party; 1926 – 1927	Succeeded by George Lansbury
