= Door de Graaf =

British-Dutch resistance member (1920–2011)

- Born: Dorothy Sherston; 1 March 1920; Milnthorpe, Westmorland, Cumbria
- Died: 2 January 2011 (aged 90); Zeist
- Other names: Dodie Sherston, Dorothy Tazelaar
- Occupations: SOE, translator

Dorothy "Dodie" Sherston (1 March 1920 - 2 January 2011), later known as Door de Graaf, was a British-Dutch resistance member and translator who worked for the Special Operations Executive (SOE). Sherston was involved in supporting the Dutch Engelandvaarders who fled to England to fight with the Allies against the Nazis during the Second World War. She later became a campaigner for mental health support in the Netherlands.

== Early life ==
Dorothy Sherston, often affectionately called Dodie, was born on 1 March 1920 on the Dallam Tower estate in the village of Milnthorpe, Westmorland, now part of the county of Cumbria in north-west England. She was the daughter of Geoffrey Sherston and Dorothy Peart Robinson. Her mother died from puerperal fever two days after giving birth to her. Geoffrey remarried shortly after the death of his wife, to her first cousin Monica Barrett and they had three children: Heather, Jill and Jack Sherston, half siblings to the young Dodie.

She grew up in various country houses which her father managed and attended Felixtowe College. She spent many holidays with her paternal aunt Ethel "Outoo" Dugdale, at her home Sezincote in Gloucestershire. Aunt Outoo was a suffragette and mother of John Dugdale, later an MP, and had a strong influence over Dodie as a child and young woman.

== Second World War ==
When the Second World War broke out, Sherston was 19 years old and keen to join the war effort. She joined the Ministry of Economic Warfare, where she checked notes of lading for signs of fraud or hidden weapons, but reportedly never found any. During the Blitz she drove an ambulance through London, where large parts of the city had been destroyed by bombing.

== Engelandvaarders and the SOE ==
After a visit to the cinema with her aunt Ethel Dugdale, where they watched The Silver Fleet about the Dutch Navy, Sherston and her aunt met the Dutch pilot Cor Sipkes in a restaurant in London's Chinatown, where they all shared a table. He introduced her to the Dutch refugees, the Engelandvaarders, who had a refuge in Bayswater called Oranjehaven where they were welcomed and cared for, and she started to work there.

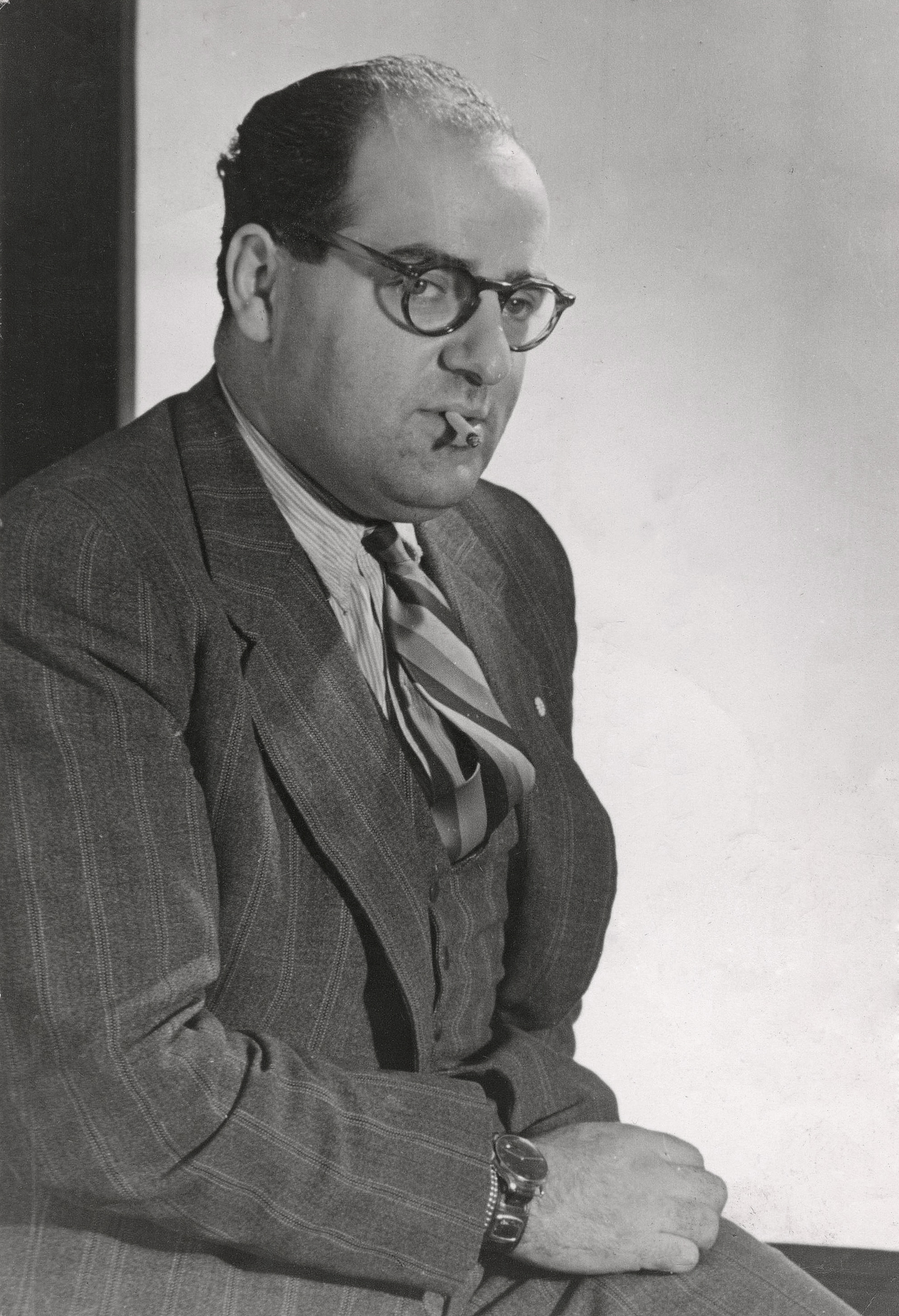
Sally Noach, Lyon 1942

Here she befriended Sally Noach, a Dutch Jewish refugee who had secured the escape of hundreds of Jews in Lyon, before escaping to Britain himself in 1942. He taught her Dutch. In time, Sherston became the hostess for Oranjehaven and was nicknamed Door. She received the refugees and helped them to find their feet, so that later, as agents of the SOE, they could fight alongside the Allies.

It was through this work that she met and married her first husband, Peter Tazelaar, a member of the Dutch resistance, whose exploits (such sneaking past guards in a tuxedo) are thought to have inspired elements of the James Bond stories. Sherston initially kept their marriage secret from her family as Tazelaar was part Indonesian and her father would have disapproved. They lived in the basement of the Oranjehaven.The marriage did not last long after she met Kas de Graaf in 1944.

Kas de Graaf was also a member of the Dutch resistance and arrived in London in January 1944 to warn the SOE that their network in Holland had been under the control of Das Englandspiel, a German counter-espionage operation, for more than two years. As a consequence, agents dropped over Holland had been falling straight into the grasp of the Gestapo. Kas de Graaf became second-in-command of a reorganised SOE Dutch network, running its agents. Dodie Sherston, with her experience working with the Engelandvaarders and ability to speak Dutch was recruited to be the department's new assistant. They became a couple, and Sherston left her husband Peter Tazelaar for de Graaf.

== Postwar ==
After the war Sherston worked in Holland for a further year as part of the recovery support process before being demobbed. Sherston and de Graaf were married in 1946, her name becoming Door de Graaf. The couple settled in Holland and had four children: Jeff, Martje, Kasper and Marc.

After her marriage Door de Graaf worked as a translator, first for Shell, then for the International Court of Justice in The Hague and later for the Ministry of Foreign Affairs.

== 1960s and 1970s ==
By the mid-sixties, the de Graaf marriage was at an end. Feminism was on the rise and Door de Graaf, who believed that women should be able to develop personally, professionally and artistically in a safe place, founded a Vrouwenschool (Women's School).

She also made great efforts to find good psychological care for her eldest son, who had long-term psychological problems. Frustrated by the shortcomings of the bureaucratic, process-driven mental health care available at the time, in the early 1970s she founded Cliëntenbond (the Clients' Union), with other parents dealing with similar challenges. It is still active today and a key element of the Netherlands' mental health care provision.

== Anthroposophy ==
In 1980 de Graaf-Sherston started providing psychotherapy training based on anthroposophical principles, such as: Het kind in jezelf (The child in you), Vrede op mensenmaat (Peace on a human scale) en Oefengroep Authenciteit (Authencity Exercise Group). In the same year she met the Steiner teacher and artist Frans Reuvers and they often delivered anthroposophical courses together, becoming life partners for the next thirty years. de Graaf-Sherston was committed to the underprivileged and the outcasts. She supported environmental campaigns and opposed war. Together with Reuvers, she regularly visited Morocco, where they forged close ties with the local population.

== Later life and death ==
In 1998 Door de Graaf-Sherston's eldest son Jeff died at the age of 51. She lived in the Netherlands for over sixty years, but maintained contact with her half-sisters and half-brother, meeting in 2000 for a reunion dinner in Richmond a few months before her half-brother Jack died. In May 2010 her partner Frans Reuvers died. After living for a further six months in their home in Zutphen, she moved to Huize Valckenbosch in Zeist, a residential care home run on anthroposophical principles.

Dorothy de Graaf-Sherston died there seven months later, on 2 January 2011 at the age of 90.
