= Gerald Templer =

Chief of the Imperial General Staff

Field Marshal Sir Gerald Templer KG GCB GCMG KBE DSO
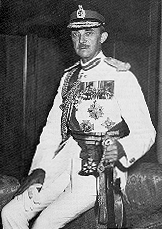
- General Sir Gerald Templer in Malaya, 1953
- Born: 11 September 1898; Colchester, Essex, England
- Died: 25 October 1979 (aged 81); Chelsea, London, England
- Burial place: St. Michael's churchyard, Wilsford, Salisbury, Wiltshire, England
- Military career
- Allegiance: United Kingdom
- Branch: British Army
- Service years: 1916–1958
- Rank: Field Marshal
- Nickname: "Tiger of Malaya"
- Service number: 15307
- Units: Royal Irish Fusiliers; Loyal Regiment (North Lancashire)
- Commands: Chief of the Imperial General Staff (1955–1958); Eastern Command (1950–1952); 6th Armoured Division (1944); 56th (London) Infantry Division (1943–1944); 1st Infantry Division (1943); XI Corps (1943); II Corps (1942–1943); 47th (London) Infantry Division (1942); 210th Independent Infantry Brigade (Home) (1940–1941); 9th Battalion, Royal Sussex Regiment (1940)
- Conflicts: First World War; Hundred Days Offensive; Arab revolt in Palestine; Second World War; North African campaign; Italian campaign; Battle of Anzio; Battle of Monte Cassino; Gothic Line offensive; Western Allied invasion of Germany; Malayan Emergency; Suez Crisis
- Awards: Knight Companion of the Order of the Garter; Knight Grand Cross of the Order of the Bath; Knight Grand Cross of the Order of St Michael and St George; Knight Commander of the Order of the British Empire; Companion of the Distinguished Service Order; Mentioned in Despatches (2); Commander of the Legion of Merit (United States); Commander of the Order of Leopold II (Belgium); Croix de guerre (Belgium); Grand Officer of the Order of Orange-Nassau with Swords (Netherlands); Grand Commander of the Order of the Defender of the Realm (Malaya)

Field Marshal Sir Gerald Walter Robert Templer (11 September 1898 – 25 October 1979) was a senior British Army officer. He fought in both the world wars and was involved in the British response to the 1936–1939 Arab revolt in Palestine. As Chief of the Imperial General Staff, the professional head of the British Army between 1955 and 1958, Templer was Prime Minister Anthony Eden's chief military adviser during the Suez Crisis. He is also credited as a founder of the United Kingdom's National Army Museum.

Templer is best known for implementing strategies that heavily contributed to the defeat of the Malayan National Liberation Army (MNLA) during the Malayan Emergency. Some historians have described his methods as a successful example of a "hearts and minds" campaign, while other scholars have dismissed this as a myth due to his over-reliance on population control and coercion. Templer also oversaw, ordered, and personally approved of many controversial policies and numerous atrocities committed by his troops. These including the use of internment camps called "New Villages", the forced relocation of ethnic minorities, forced conscription, collective punishment against civilians, the hiring of specialist Iban-headhunters to decapitate suspected communists, pioneering the use of Agent Orange (later used in Vietnam), and the use of scorched earth policies to deprive the MNLA of resources.

Many of the counter-insurgency strategies he pioneered were later imitated by the United States in Vietnam.

== Early life and education ==
Gerald Walter Robert Templer was born on 11 September 1898 at 15 Wellesley Road, in Colchester, Essex, the son (and only child) of Lieutenant-Colonel Walter Francis Templer, of the Royal Irish Fusiliers, and Mabel Eileen Templer (née Johnston). Of Irish descent, Templer attended an infant school at Rosslyn, Scotland, before being sent to Edinburgh Academy in 1904, later attending a preparatory boarding school at Connaught House, Weymouth, from 1909 until 1911. In January 1912 he was sent to Wellington College, Berkshire and stayed there until shortly after his 17th birthday in September 1915, a year into the First World War. His time at Wellington was, due mainly to initially being severely bullied, not the happiest period of his life, as he later wrote "I loathed and detested my four years at Wellington", although he also admitted to making numerous friends there.

== First World War ==
From Wellington he then entered the Royal Military College, Sandhurst in December 1915 and, after attending a shortened course for the war, was commissioned as a second lieutenant into his father's regiment, the Royal Irish Fusiliers, on 16 August 1916, just under a month before his 18th birthday. In contrast to his time at Wellington, Templer greatly enjoyed Sandhurst, and later wrote with amusement that he "was a completely undistinguished cadet from every point of view and passed out – nobody failed at that stage of the First World War because we were so badly needed as cannon fodder – in July 1916, a couple of months before my eighteenth birthday". Due to his age, however, he was unable to serve overseas and was sent to the 3rd (Reserve) Battalion in Buncrana in Inishowen, on the north coast of County Donegal, in Ulster, Ireland.

Templer remained with the battalion until mid-October 1917 when, now aged 19, he was sent to the 7th/8th (Service) Battalion on the Western Front. The battalion was a Kitchener's Army unit serving as part of the 49th Brigade of the 16th (Irish) Division. However, he was posted to 'C' Company of the 1st Battalion in mid-November a Regular Army unit, then serving in the 107th Brigade of the 36th (Ulster) Division. Soon after Templer's arrival, the battalion took part in the Battle of Cambrai in late November, although Templer himself took no part in the battle and the battalion, and his 'C' Company in particular, sustained heavy losses. In early February 1918 Templer's battalion, the 1st Irish Fusiliers, was transferred to the 108th Brigade, due to a severe manpower shortage in the British Expeditionary Force (BEF) on the Western Front, which necessitated the reduction of all British brigades from four to three battalions. He was promoted to lieutenant on 16 February 1918. On 20 March Templer, seriously ill, passed out while in the trenches, suffering from acute diphtheria, and he was later evacuated to England. The German Army launched their Spring Offensive the day after and, while he was away his battalion sustained over 770 casualties out of a strength of some 800 men. He returned to the battalion, now composed of mainly teenagers, and fought with it in the Hundred Days Offensive, which saw the war turn in favour of the Allies and eventually resulted in the Armistice with Germany being signed and the war ending on 11 November 1918. Templer was considerably lucky during the war, having not been wounded, although, as with many others of his generation, it left its mark on him in other ways. He wrote, many years later, "I still sometimes in my sleep at night hear the screams of the wounded horses, galloping on the ground, tripping over barbed wire, and treading on their own guts. It was a terrible thing to have to witness, worse in some ways than the human casualties". A week before his death Templer had this dream again, over sixty years after the war.

== Interwar period ==
He remained in the army during the interwar period and served with his battalion, still the 1st Irish Fusiliers, after briefly returning to England, in operations in Persia (now Iran) and Iraq in 1919–20 as part of a multi-national attempt to prevent the spread of bolshevism, which was followed by service in Egypt. Returning to England with the battalion, where it was amalgamated with the 2nd Battalion in November 1922, Templer was a reserve for the 1924 Summer Olympics as a 120-yard hurdler, although in the end he did not compete. In January 1925 the battalion again returned to Egypt, where it remained until October 1927 when it was sent to India, although Templer did not accompany them. Just before the battalion sailed for India he had returned to England to attend the Staff College, Camberley, which he did from 1928 to 1929, and was the youngest student there, aged just 29. Among his many fellow students were men such as John Harding, Richard McCreery, Gordon MacMillan, Alexander Galloway, Gerard Bucknall, Philip Gregson-Ellis, Alexander Cameron and Cameron Nicholson. In the year senior to him were Eric Dorman-Smith, John Hawkesworth, John Whiteley, Evelyn Barker, Oliver Leese, Ronald Penney, Robert Bridgeman, Philip Christison and numerous others while, in Templer's second year, in the year below, were George Erskine, Harold Freeman-Attwood, Neil Ritchie, Herbert Lumsden, Reginald Denning and Maurice Chilton. Templer's instructors there included Bernard Paget, Henry Pownall and Bernard Montgomery. Due to the Royal Irish Fusiliers being reduced to a single battalion in 1922, and thus promotion in the regiment being slower than in the rest of the army, Templer was forced to transfer to the Loyal Regiment (North Lancashire), to gain a promotion to captain, which was backdated to 11 August 1928. After graduation from the Staff College, Templer joined the 2nd Battalion of his new regiment, then stationed at Aldershot, in January 1930.

He later became a General Staff Officer Grade 3 (GSO3) with the 3rd Division on Salisbury Plain in 1931. While there his immediate superior, Colonel Edmund Osborne, the division's GSO1, who took a disliking to Templer, wrote a confidential report, severely criticizing Templer's performance and recommending he be retired from the army. Surviving this, Templer then was GSO2 at HQ Northern Command in York in 1933 before returning to the 2nd Loyals to be a company commander at Tidworth in April 1935. While at Northern Command he first met Harold Alexander, then a colonel, who was his superior as GSO1, and the two remained great friends until Alexander's death in 1969. In January 1936 Templer, along with a large draft of replacements from the 2nd Loyals, was deployed to Palestine to serve with the 1st Loyals, with Templer commanding 'A' Company, during the Arab revolt there, for which he was appointed a Companion of the Distinguished Service Order (DSO) on 6 November 1936 and mentioned in dispatches. His experience in Palestine had a profound impact on him, as he said in 1970 in a BBC interview, "I've felt terribly strongly all my life, from my youth, on racial and religious clashes – ever since my boyhood in Ireland. That was a feeling that which was strengthened by my service in Palestine in 1935–6, the Jew-Arab problems: I felt them bitterly in my heart". In July 1937 he left Palestine and returned to England, where he became GSO2 of the 53rd (Welsh) Infantry Division, a Territorial Army (TA) formation, where he came to the attention of senior officers. In April 1938 Templer transferred back as a captain in the Royal Irish Fusiliers, although he remained seconded for staff duties. He was promoted to major on 1 August 1938 and posted to the War Office as a GSO2 at the Directorate of Military Intelligence (DMI) in October. In this role he helped in the creation and training of the Intelligence Corps.

== Second World War ==
At the outbreak of the Second World War in September 1939 Templer was an acting lieutenant-colonel, and, on 4 September, the day after war was declared, he was chosen to be one of two GSO1s to the DMI of the British Expeditionary Force (BEF), Major-General Noel Mason-MacFarlane, replacing the original choice, Kenneth Strong. He soon found himself in France. Templer's duties were mainly concerned with counter-intelligence and security. The German Army attacked in the West on 10 May 1940, although Templer himself was then on leave but was back in France and discovered Mason-MacFarlane was in Brussels, with the intelligence staff moving behind him but was a long distance from GHQ BEF, resulting in poor communications. On 17 May General Lord Gort, the BEF's Commander-in-Chief (C-in-C), feared for the BEF's right flank along the River Scarpe and, due to a shortage of troops, ordered Mason-MacFarlane to form "Macforce" to hold the river with whatever troops could be found. Templer subsequently became GSO1 of "Macforce". The only unit of any size then available was Brigadier John Smyth's 127th Brigade, detached from its parent 42nd Division, which was soon strengthened by armoured cars of Lieutenant-Colonel George Hopkinson's "Hopkinson Mission", and some scattered artillery and engineer units. The 127th Brigade was soon replaced by the 139th Brigade (also detached its parent 46th Division) and "Macforce" continued taking on scattered units and, after a few small skirmishes but no major engagements, was eventually disbanded. With the BEF retreating to Dunkirk, both Mason-MacFarlane and Templer were evacuated to England, arriving there on 27 May.

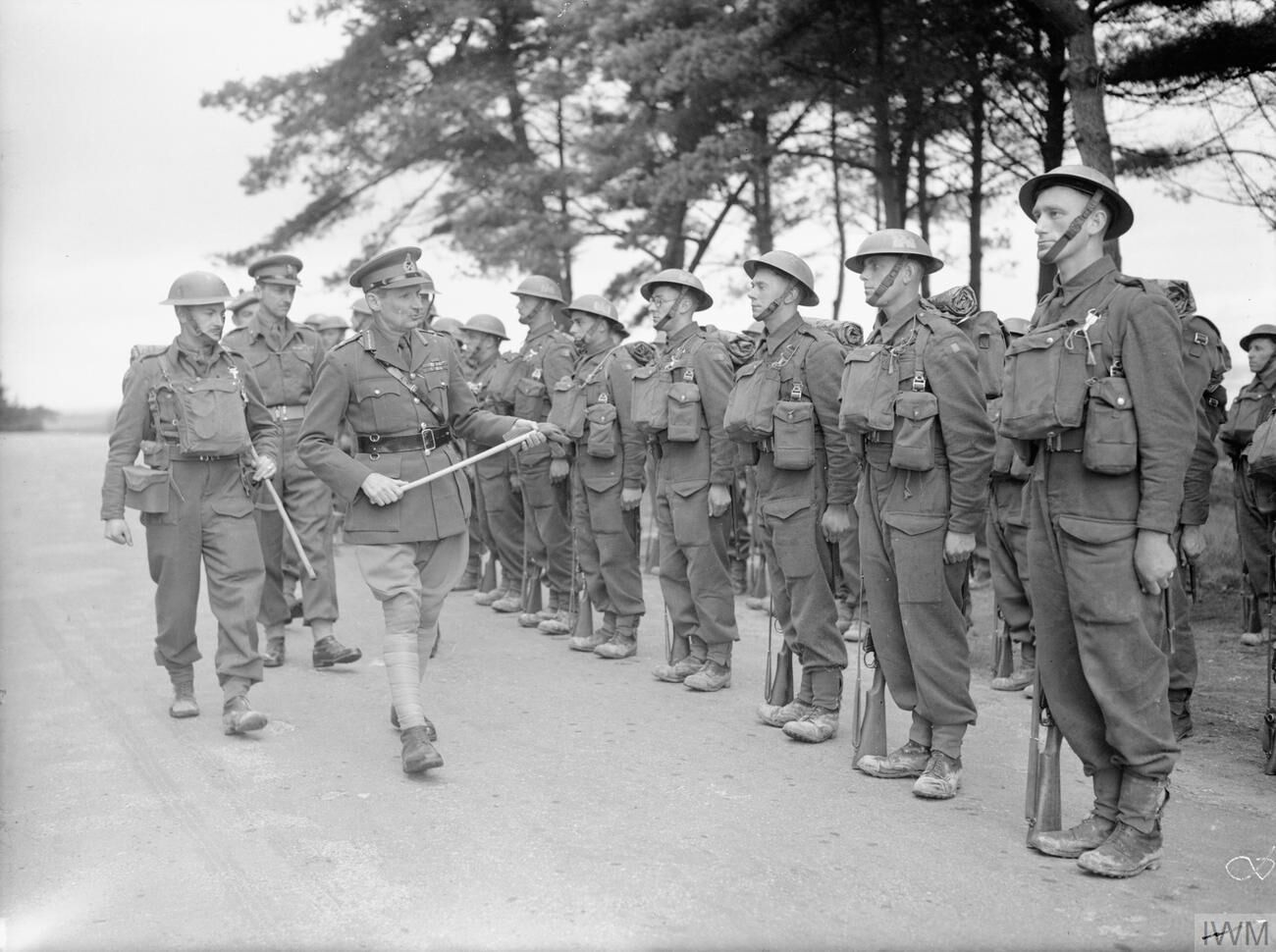
Lieutenant-General Bernard Montgomery inspecting men of the 7th Battalion, Suffolk Regiment, at Sandbanks near Poole, 22 March 1941. Also pictured, to his right wearing a peaked cap, is Brigadier Gerald Templer.

Soon after returning to England Templer was, in mid-June, ordered to Chichester to raise the 9th Battalion of the Royal Sussex Regiment, one of many then being raised in the aftermath of Dunkirk. The battalion was to be based around a small cadre of Regular soldiers from the 2nd Battalion, Royal Sussex who, like Templer, had recently returned from France, and the rest of the battalion was to consist of newly called up conscripts, most of whom were in their late twenties with no previous military experience. The battalion moved to Ross-on-Wye soon after its official formation on 4 July 1940. The task was made more difficult by the lack of rifles and other necessary equipment but Templer tried his best to train his men instil in them a regimental pride.

In early November he was given the command of the 210th Independent Infantry Brigade (Home), composed of five battalions, all less than six months old, in Dorset, with responsibility for the defence of the coast in the event of a German invasion between Lyme Regis and Poole. The brigade was then serving under V Corps, commanded by Lieutenant-General Bernard Montgomery, one of Templer's instructors at the Staff College, who thought highly of him and the two, who shared similar outlooks on training and waging war, established a close working relationship. Captain Michael Joseph, a company commander in the 9th Battalion, Queen's Own Royal West Kent Regiment, part of the 210th Brigade, claimed Templer "understood the difficulties and the problems of the platoon commander, which is more than can be said of some others". Work on the beach defences combined with training and continued throughout the winter and into the spring, and in late April 1941 the brigade, now with a slightly different composition, came under the command of the Dorset County Division, one of the newly created British County Divisions formed specifically for static defence. However, on 7 April Montgomery was promoted to the command of XII Corps in Kent and Sussex and recommended to the War Office that Templer be the Brigadier General Staff (BGS) of V Corps, which now came under the command of Lieutenant-General Edmond Schreiber. Like Montgomery, Schreiber formed a high opinion of Templer and they got along well together. The summer was spent mainly on numerous exercises. In early March 1942 Schreiber was promoted to command of "Force 110", later redesignated as the First Army, and V Corps passed to Lieutenant-General Charles Allfrey. Soon afterwards, however, Templer received note that he was to take over the command of a division. Templer was promoted to substantive colonel on 6 October 1941, with seniority from 1 July.

Templer became General Officer Commanding (GOC) of the 47th (London) Infantry Division, based in Winchester, Hampshire as an acting major-general on 10 April 1942, serving under V Corps. The division – comprising the 25th, 140th and 141st Infantry Brigades and supporting units – was a second-line TA formation, formerly the 2nd London Division, redesignated the 47th Division in November 1940. Placed on the Lower Establishment in December 1941, the division was understrength in manpower and equipment and men were constantly posted as drafts overseas, but the men were well-trained, due to their previous GOC, Major-General John Utterson-Kelso, one of the best trainers in the British Army. According to a battalion commander, Lieutenant-Colonel Kenneth Darling, commanding the 11th Battalion, Royal Fusiliers, Templer "inspired the Division with enthusiasm, keenness and efficiency", and "made them believe they were going to meet the Germans – and beat them. He inculcated a tremendous fighting spirit". Another junior staff officer, Edward Jones, believed Templer to be very nervy but keen, claiming he never slept during an exercise, no matter the length and believed he would burn himself out.

He did not remain there for much longer, however, as, in September 1942, he was promoted to become GOC II Corps as the British Army's youngest acting lieutenant-general. However, the corps was actually II Corps District, a static formation, with responsibility for the defence of northern East Anglia against invasion. By this time, the threat of invasion had much receded and, by early 1943, much of Templer's command had been posted away, the 1st Division moving to North Africa and the 76th Division being reduced to a reserve division, leaving Templer with little more than 30 Home Guard battalions. Then, in April 1943, he took command of XI Corps, with the 54th and 61st Divisions and numerous smaller units under command, after II Corps was disbanded. His corps responsibility was for the defence of all of East Anglia. Despite this, Templer was growing impatient at training troops and wished for a field command. To this end, in July, he approached General Sir Bernard Paget, the Commander-in-Chief, Home Forces (and formerly one of Templer's instructors at the Staff College), and offered to give up his rank of acting lieutenant-general so that he could command a division on active service. His offer was accepted and, together with Gerard Bucknall (a fellow student at the Staff College who, like Templer, had risen rapidly but was presumably sharing his mindset), Templer, reverting to major-general on 30 July, flew out to Algiers, arriving there the day after.

Templer became GOC of the 1st Infantry Division, which had come under his command while he was GOC II Corps, on 31 July 1943. The division, with the 2nd, 3rd Infantry Brigades and the 24th Guards Brigade and supporting units, was based south of Tunis and had recently fought, with great distinction, in the final phases of the Tunisian campaign, where it had gained three Victoria Crosses (VC) in the space of a week. The division was then training for future participation in the Italian campaign. In late August General Sir Harold Alexander, commanding the Allied 15th Army Group, along with numerous and senior US and British generals, arrived to present the VC to Lance Corporal John Kenneally of the 1st Battalion, Irish Guards. Shortly afterwards, the division was involved in a divisional parade, with General Dwight "Ike" Eisenhower, the Supreme Allied Commander in the theatre, reviewing the entire division. Templer himself wrote about the moment, saying:

I think it was the proudest moment of my life. In his address Ike said, 'When it gives me, your Supreme Commander and an American general, as proud to see you, the 1st Division of the British Army, on parade today as if you were the 1st Division of the American Army, then we are really getting somewhere!' It was a magnificent parade, and as far as I know, unique.

Despite managing to concentrate the division and get it training in mountain warfare, Templer was not destined to lead the 1st Division into battle, although he was later to meet it again in Italy.

On 10 October 1943, Major-General Douglas Graham, the GOC of the 56th (London) Infantry Division, then fighting in Italy, was seriously injured when his jeep tumbled into a shell crater and Templer was ordered to Italy to replace him. He arrived in Italy on 15 October, when the division was in the middle of crossing the Volturno. The division, a first-line TA formation, with the 167th, 168th and 169th Infantry Brigades and supporting troops, along with the 201st Guards Brigade under Brigadier Julian Gascoigne temporarily attached, had taken part in the Allied invasion of Italy at Salerno the month before as part of British X Corps, under Lieutenant-General Richard McCreery (a fellow student of Templer's at the Staff College in the late 1920s), and had suffered heavy casualties, and the division was still understrength.

In February 1944, the division, now under U.S. VI Corps, fought in the Battle of Anzio where Templer temporarily commanded the British 1st Infantry Division after the GOC, Major-General Ronald Penney, was wounded by shellfire. He was appointed a Companion of the Order of the Bath on 24 August 1944 in recognition of his services in Italy.

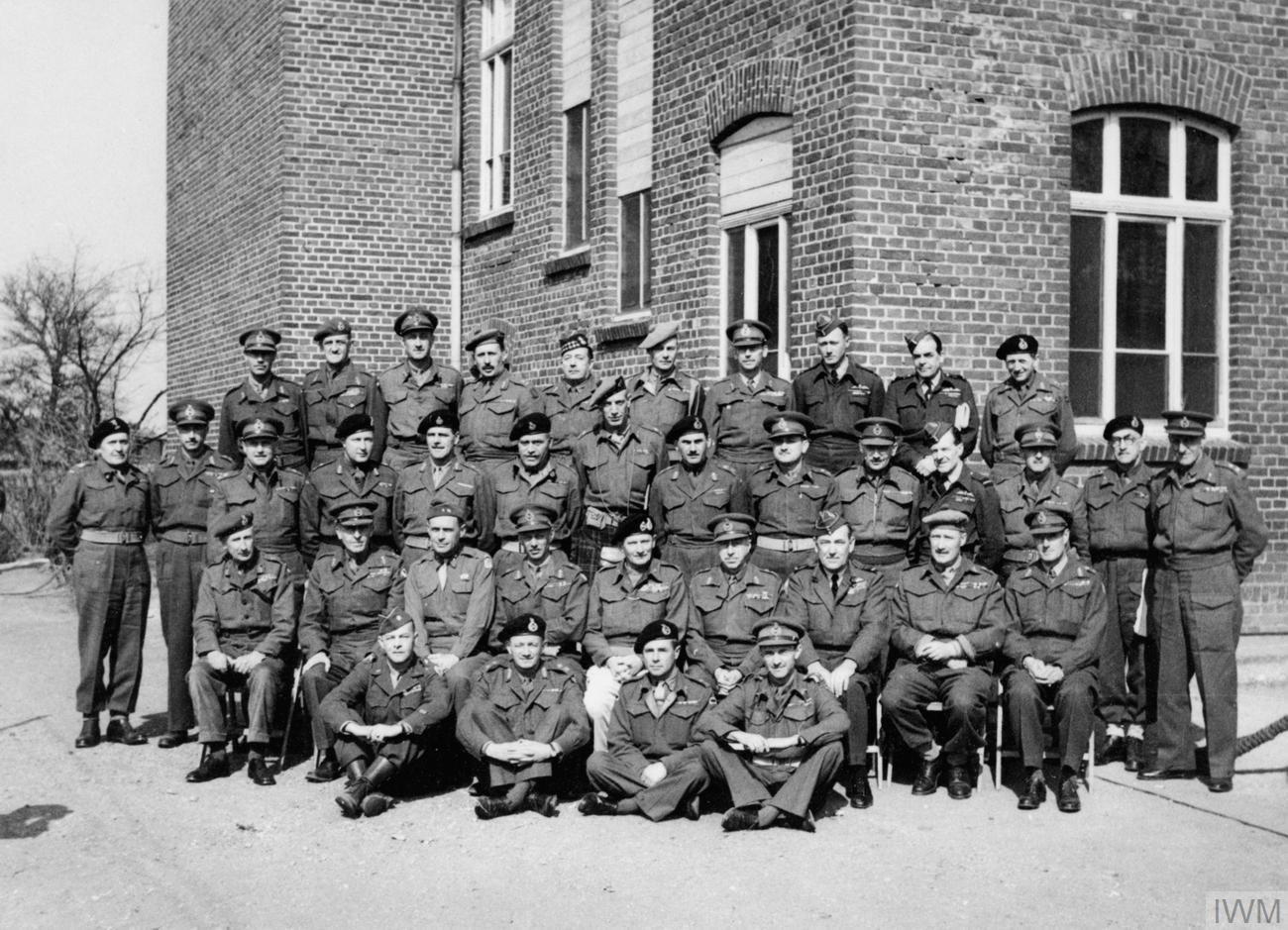
Field Marshal Sir Bernard L. Montgomery poses for a group photograph with his staff, corps and divisional commanders at Walbeck, Germany, 22 March 1945. Pictured sitting on the ground, fourth on the right, is Major-General G. W. R. Templer.

In late July 1944, Templer briefly became GOC 6th Armoured Division before being severely injured by a land mine in August, after being GOC for twelve days. Promoted to major-general on 17 April 1945, he spent the rest of the war on intelligence duties in 21st Army Group HQ as well as briefly heading the German Directorate of the Special Operations Executive (SOE). He was mentioned in dispatches on 8 November 1945 in recognition of his services in North West Europe.

== Postwar ==
On 17 October 1946, Templer was awarded the Legion of Merit in the Degree of Commander by the President of the United States for his conduct during the war. He was also appointed a Commander of the Order of Leopold II of Belgium and Croix de guerre and a Grand Officer of the Order of Orange Nassau of the Netherlands with Swords.

He served as Deputy Chief of Staff for the British Element (CCG/BE) of the Allied Control Commission for Germany after the Second World War, for which he was appointed a Companion of the Order of St Michael and St George in the King's Birthday Honours 1946.

He first came to public notice in 1945 while acting as Director of the Military Government in the British Zone of Germany, when he fired the mayor of Cologne, Konrad Adenauer, for "laziness and inefficiency". This became an issue in 1954, when it was mooted he should become commander of the British Army of the Rhine; fearing an adverse reaction from Adenauer – who was now Chancellor – the British Prime Minister, Winston Churchill demurred and Templer was not appointed after his tour in Malaya ended.

Templer became Director of Military Intelligence at the War Office in March 1946, then Vice Chief of the Imperial General Staff in February 1948. Having been promoted to lieutenant-general on 5 April 1948 and appointed a Knight Commander of the Order of the British Empire in the New Year Honours 1949, he moved on to be General Officer Commanding Eastern Command on 18 February 1950. He was promoted to general on 4 June 1950, advanced to Knight Commander of the Order of the Bath in the King's Birthday Honours 1951, and appointed Aide-de-Camp General to the King on 30 August 1951. He also became a Knight of the Venerable Order of Saint John.

== High Commissioner for Malaya ==
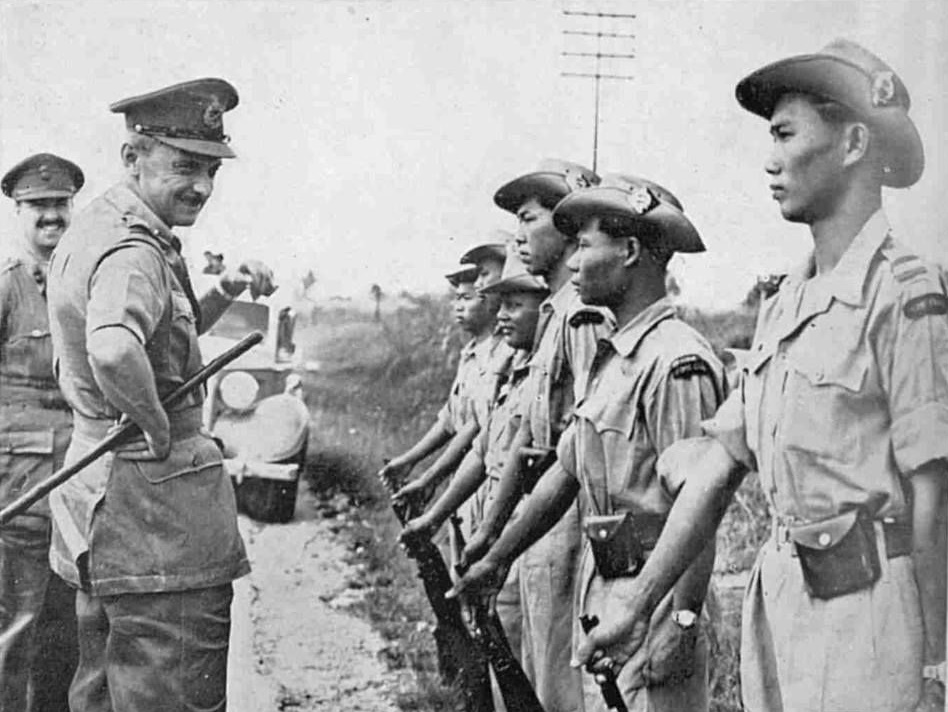
Sir Gerald Templer and his assistant, Major Lord Wynford inspecting the members of Kinta Valley Home Guard (KVHG) in Perak, c. 1952.

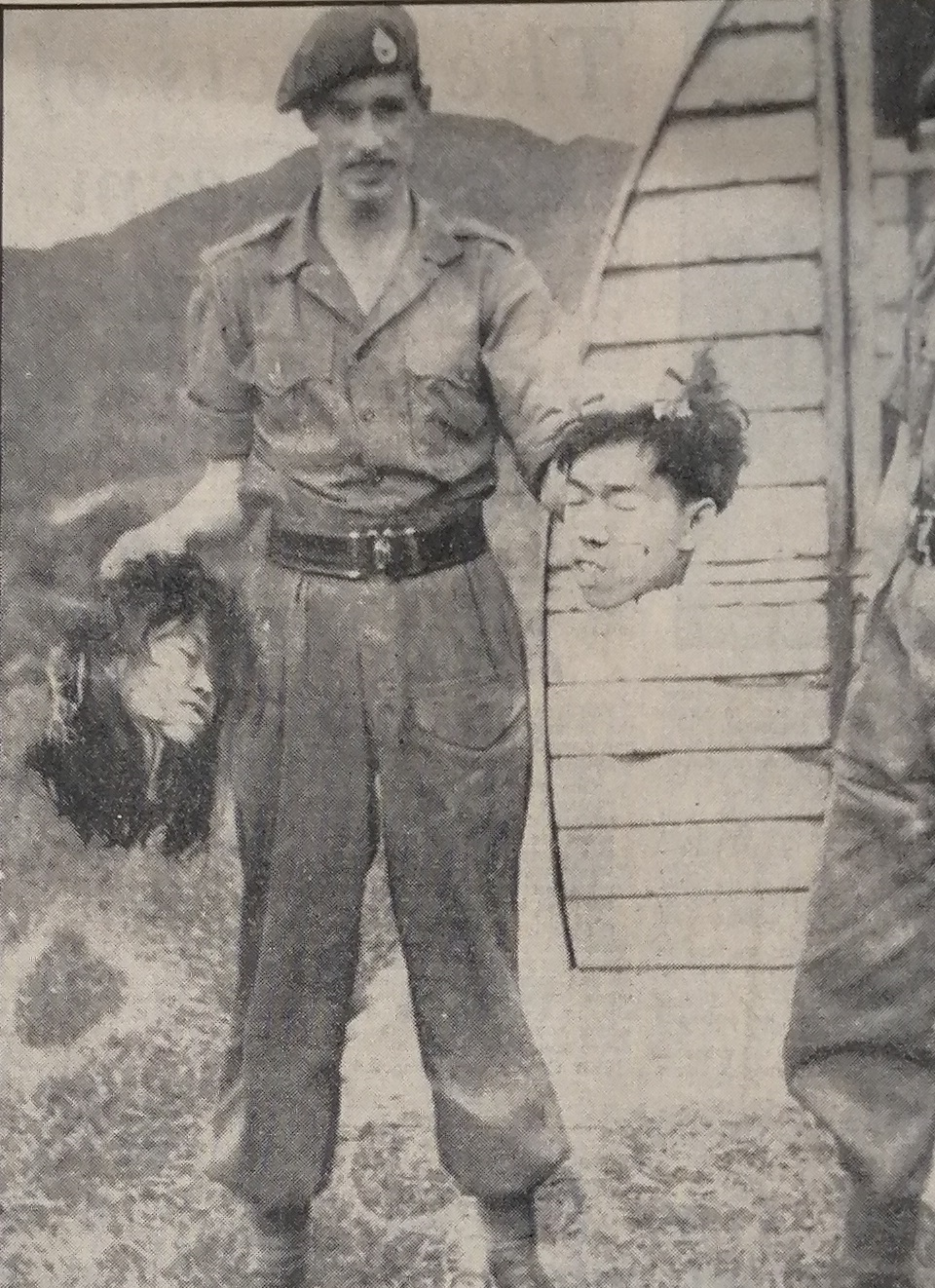
A British Royal Marine in Malay poses with the heads of two MNLA guerrillas. Templer oversaw and defended the practice of decapitating suspected pro-independence fighters during the Malayan Emergency

On 22 January 1952, Winston Churchill appointed Templer British High Commissioner for Malaya to deal with the Malayan Emergency. Working closely with Robert Thompson, the Permanent Secretary of Defence for Malaya, Templer's tactics against the Malayan National Liberation Army (MNLA) were held up by Heathcote as "one of the most successful of the British Army's counter-insurgency campaigns". In military terms Templer concentrated his efforts on intelligence. Templer famously remarked that, "The answer [to the uprising] lies not in pouring more troops into the jungle, but in the hearts and minds of the people."

He instituted incentive schemes for rewarding surrendering rebels and those who encouraged them to surrender and used strict curfews and tight control of food supplies to force compliance from rebellious areas to flush out guerillas. Crops grown by the communists in response to these measures were sprayed with herbicide and defoliants (2,4,5-trichlorophenoxyacetic acid), the practice of which prepared the way for American use of Agent Orange in Vietnam. Restrictions on food and curfews were lifted on so-called White Areas which had been found to be free of communist incursion.

In private correspondences with Colonial Secretary Oliver Lyttleton, Templer defended the practice of British troops employing Dayak headhunters to cut the heads off suspected MNLA guerillas. The widespread use of decapitations by Templer's troops in Malaya was exposed to the public by a British communist newspaper called The Daily Worker when they published the first known photographs of the decapitations in April 1952.

During his time in Malaya, Templer became commonly known as the "Tiger of Malaya", a title previously enjoyed by the Japanese general Tomoyuki Yamashita, who had captured Singapore and Malaya in 1942. In response to an article in Time magazine that "the jungle had been stabilised", he declared "I'll shoot the bastard who says that this emergency is over". The Malayan government eventually declared the Emergency over in 1960. He was advanced to Knight Grand Cross of the Order of St Michael and St George for his work as High Commissioner in the Coronation Honours List in June 1953.

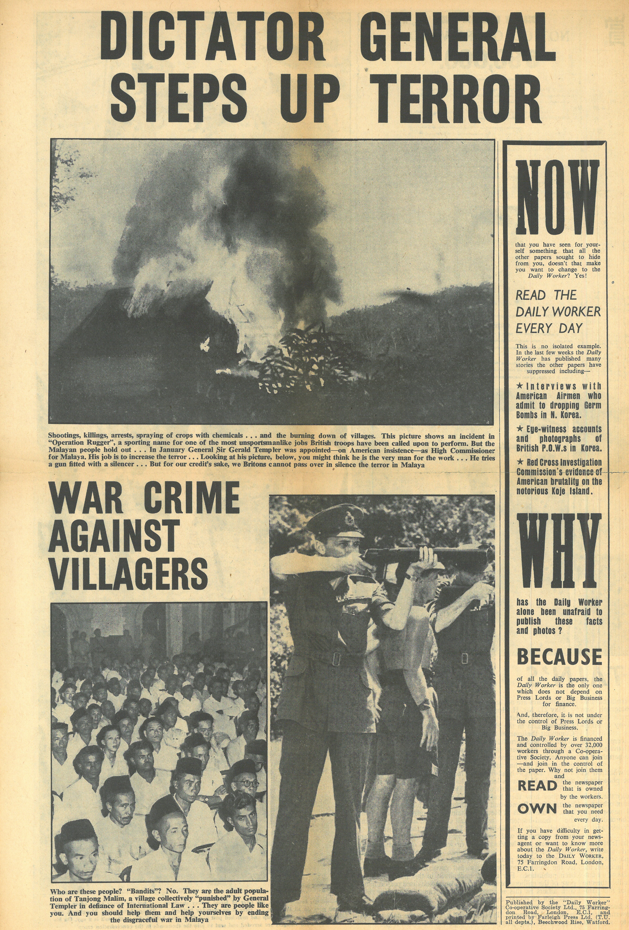
Page of a 1952 Daily Worker leaflet accusing Templer of committing atrocities in Malaya.

Although Templer's actions were successful in helping to defeat the MNLA, they required the use of many controversial strategies, including the continued use of internment camps known as "New Villages", the forced relocation of ethnic minorities, forced conscription, collective punishment against civilians, the hiring of specialist headhunters to decapitate suspected communists, herbicidal warfare through the use of Agent Orange, and the widespread killing of livestock and destruction of food crops to deprive the MNLA of resources.

In 1952 the poet Randall Swingler wrote a poem about Templer titled "The Ballad of Herod Templer". The poem is believed to have been inspired by the British-Malayan headhunting scandal.

The Malaysian Government arranged for the Main Hall at the Royal Military College, Kuala Lumpur in Sungai Besi, which had been established in 1952, to be named the "Tun Templer Hall" in his honour. They also named after him Templer's Park, a nature reserve established in 1955 in Rawang, as well as the Selangor state assembly constituency surrounding it.

== Later military career ==
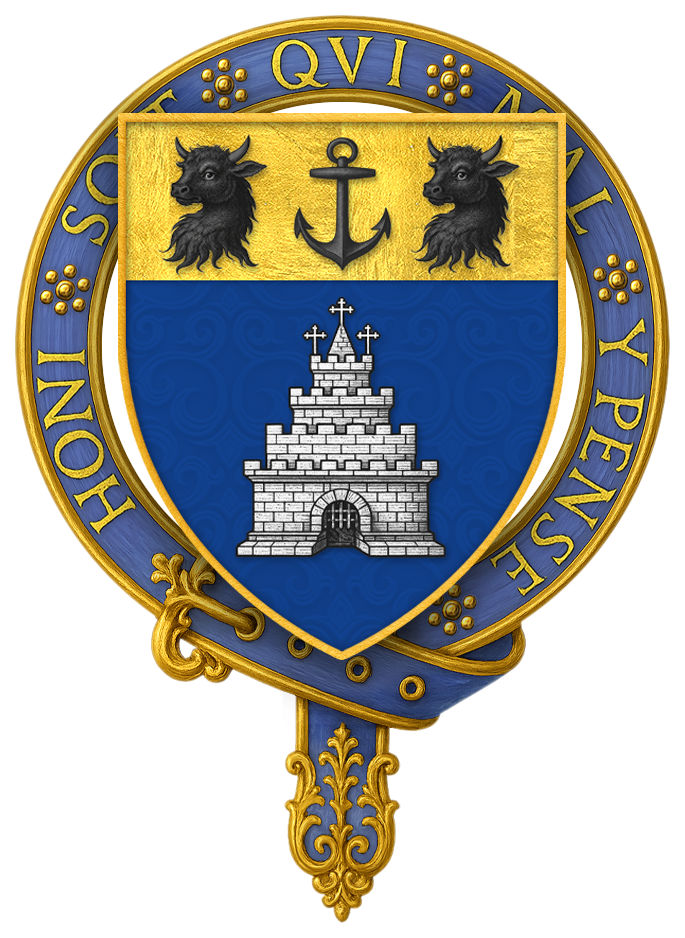
Garter-encircled arms of Sir Gerald Templer

Advanced to Knight Grand Cross of the Order of the Bath in the Queen's Birthday Honours 1955, Templer was appointed Chief of the Imperial General Staff on 29 September 1955. In this capacity he advised the British Government on the response to the Suez Crisis. He was promoted to field marshal on 27 November 1956 and retired on 29 September 1958.

Templer was also appointed Colonel of the Royal Irish Fusiliers from 1946, Colonel of the Malay Federation Regiment from 1954, Colonel of the 7th Duke of Edinburgh's Own Gurkha Rifles from 25 May 1956, Colonel of the Royal Horse Guards from 1963 and Colonel of the Blues and Royals from 1969. He was the first President of the Army Mountaineering Association, which was established in 1957.

In retirement, Templer focused on establishing the National Army Museum in London, which has named its library, archive and reading room as "The Templer Study Centre" in his honour. The Malaysian Government conferred on him the award of Grand Commander of the Order of the Defender of the Realm, which carries with it the title Tun, on 13 October 1960. He was also appointed a Knight Companion of the Order of the Garter on 16 September 1963 and Constable of the Tower on 1 August 1965. He chaired a committee of the rationalisation of air power in 1965 and was appointed Lord Lieutenant of Greater London on 28 December 1966. He died of lung cancer at his home in Chelsea on 25 October 1979. He was buried in the Churchyard of St. Michael in the Wiltshire village of Wilsford cum Lake. There is a memorial plaque to him in the Guards' Chapel, Wellington Barracks, London.

In 1981 the Society for Army Historical Research established the Templer Medal, awarded annually to the author of the book published during that year that has made the most significant contribution to the history of the British Army, to commemorate Templer's life and achievements and to mark his presidency of the Society between 1965 and 1979.

== Family ==
On 8 September 1926 he married Edith Margery (Peggie) Davie in the church of Plympton St Mary, Devon. Gerald had first met her in 1921, and again in 1924, and they were engaged after 10 days. Lady Templer was one of the co-founders of the Commonwealth Society for the Deaf, now Sound Seekers. They had a daughter, Jane Frances, born in 1934, and a son, John Miles, born in 1945. Jane Frances married Daniel O'Donovan (The O'Donovan), son of her father's old friend from the Royal Irish Fusiliers, Brigadier Morgan O'Donovan.

== Bibliography ==
- Barber, Noel (1989). The War of Running Dogs. Arrow Books. ISBN 0-09-962110-X.
- Cloake, John (1985). Templer, Tiger of Malaya: the life of field marshal Sir Gerald Templer. London, Harrap. ISBN 978-0-245-54204-6.
- Doherty, Richard (2004). Ireland's Generals in the Second World War. Four Courts Press. ISBN 9781851828654.
- Heathcote, Tony (1999). The British Field Marshals 1736–1997. Barnsley (UK): Pen & Sword. ISBN 0-85052-696-5.
- Lapping, Brian (1985). End of Empire. St Martin's Press. ISBN 978-0-312-25071-3.
- Marks, Leo (1998). Between Silk and Cyanide: A Codemaker's Story 1941-1945. HarperCollins. ISBN 0-684-86780-X.
- Mead, Richard (2007). Churchill's Lions: A Biographical Guide to the Key British Generals of World War II. Stroud: Spellmount. ISBN 978-1-86227-431-0.
- Neillands, Robin (1997). A fighting retreat : the British Empire 1947–97. London, Hodder. ISBN 978-0-340-63520-9.
- Parkinson, C. Northcote (1966). A Law Unto Themselves: Twelve Portraits. John Murray.
- Ramakrishna, Kumar (2002). Emergency Propaganda: The Winning of Malayan Hearts and Minds 1948–1958. Curzon Press, Richmond. ISBN 978-0-7007-1510-7.

Military offices
Preceded by John Utterson-Kelso	GOC 47th (London) Infantry Division; April–September 1942	Succeeded by Alfred Robinson
Preceded by James Steele	GOC II Corps; 1942–1943	Succeeded by Herbert Lumsden
Preceded by Gerard Bucknall	GOC XI Corps; April – July 1943	Post disbanded
Preceded by Walter Clutterbuck	GOC 1st Infantry Division; July – October 1943	Succeeded by Ronald Penney
Preceded by Douglas Graham	GOC 56th (London) Infantry Division; 1943–1944	Succeeded by John Whitfield
Preceded by Vyvyan Evelegh	GOC 6th Armoured Division; July – August 1944	Succeeded by Horatius Murray
Preceded by Freddie de Guingand	Director of Military Intelligence; 1946–1948	Succeeded by Douglas Packard
Preceded by Sir Frank Simpson	Vice Chief of the Imperial General Staff; 1948–1950	Succeeded by Sir Nevil Brownjohn
Preceded by Sir Evelyn Barker	GOC-in-C Eastern Command; 1950–1952	Succeeded by Sir George Erskine
Preceded by Sir John Harding	Chief of the Imperial General Staff; 1955–1958	Succeeded by Sir Francis Festing
Honorary titles
Preceded by Sir Richard Howard-Vyse	Colonel of the Royal Horse Guards; 1951–1962	Consolidated to form Blues and Royals
Government offices
Preceded by Sir Henry Gurney	British High Commissioner in Malaya; 1952–1954	Succeeded by Sir Donald MacGillivray
Honorary titles
Preceded by The Earl Alexander of Tunis	Constable of the Tower of London; 1965–1970	Succeeded by Sir Richard Hull
Preceded by The Earl Alexander of Tunis	Lord Lieutenant of Greater London; 1966–1973	Succeeded by The Lord Elworthy
