= Sarah Coombes =

British politician

Sarah Coombes MP
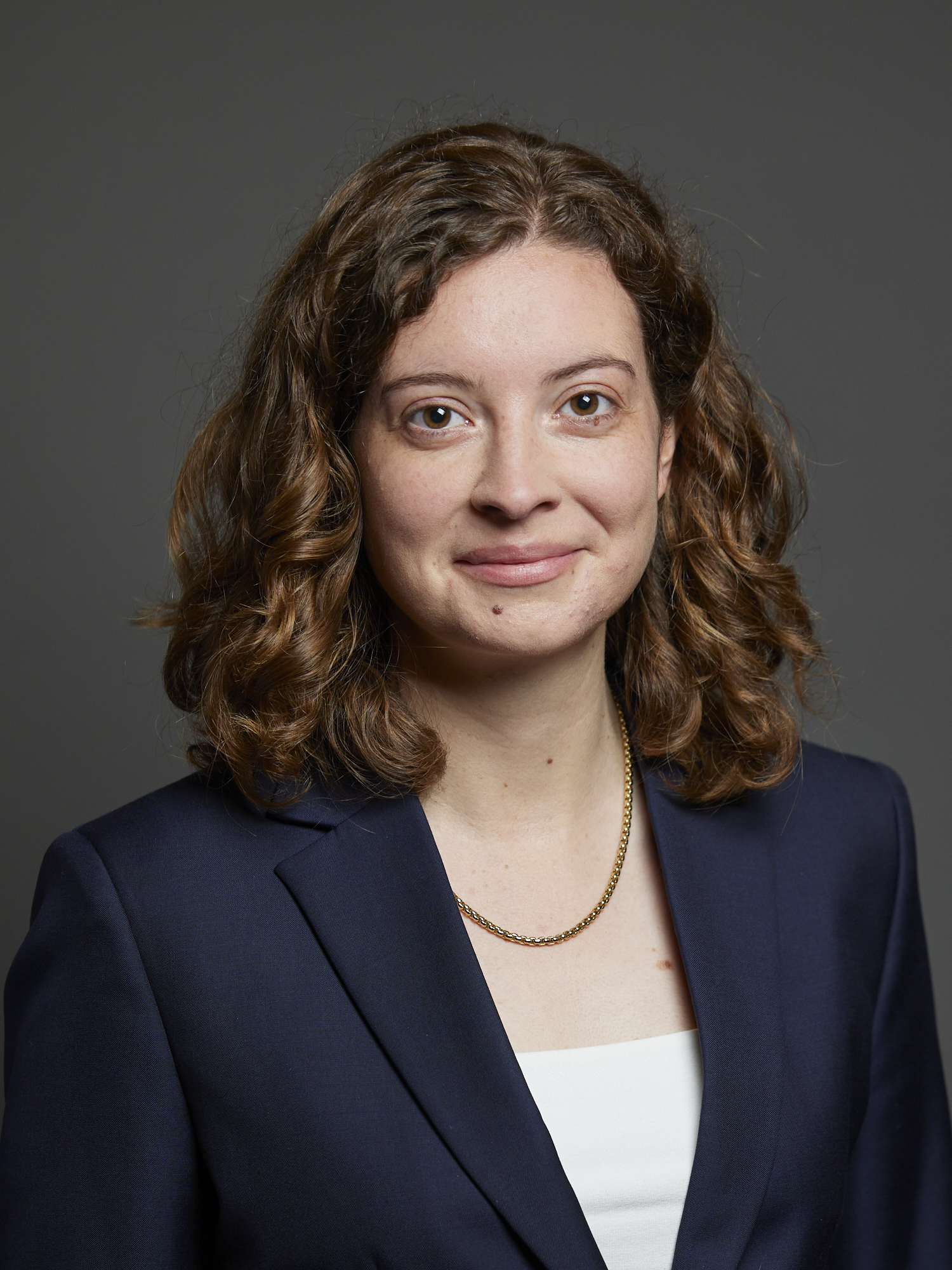
- Official portrait, 2024

Member of Parliament for West Bromwich
- Incumbent
- Assumed office 4 July 2024
- Preceded by: Constituency Established
- Majority: 9,554 (26.1%)

Assistant Government Whip
- Incumbent
- Assumed office July 2026
- Prime Minister: Andy Burnham

Parliamentary Private Secretary to Home Secretary
- In office September 2025 – July 2026
- Prime Minister: Keir Starmer

Parliamentary Private Secretary to Leader of the House of Commons
- In office July 2024 – September 2025
- Prime Minister: Keir Starmer

Personal details
- Born: November 1991 (age 34) London
- Party: Labour
- Education: Jesus College, Oxford
- Website: Official website

Sarah Tattum Coombes (born November 1991) is a British Labour Party politician who has been the Member of Parliament for West Bromwich since 2024.

== Education ==
Coombes was educated at Queens Park Community School in London and read history and politics at Jesus College, Oxford from 2010 to 2013.

== Political career ==
Coombes previously worked for Tom Watson as his head of policy and communications for three years when he was Labour deputy leader and subsequently as an advisor for the Mayor of London, Sadiq Khan.

Coombes was elected as Member of Parliament for West Bromwich in the 2024 United Kingdom general election, which includes West Bromwich, Oldbury, Great Barr, Yew Tree, Tividale and Rowley.

In July 2024, Coombes was appointed parliamentary private secretary to the Leader of the House of Commons.

In February 2025, Coombes started a campaign to crack down on the use of illegal vehicle "ghost" number plates which cannot be recognised by automatic number-plate recognition cameras.

From September 2025 Coombes was parliamentary private secretary to the Home Secretary. Since July 2026, Coombes has held the position of Assistant Whip.
