= 1941 West Bromwich by-election =

UK parliamentary by-election

The 1941 West Bromwich by-election was a parliamentary by-election held for the British House of Commons constituency of West Bromwich in Staffordshire on 16 April 1941. The seat had become vacant on the resignation of the Labour Member of Parliament Frederick Roberts, who had held the seat from 1918 to 1931 and again from the 1935 general election; he died later in 1941.

The Labour candidate, John Dugdale, was returned unopposed. Most by-elections during World War II were unopposed, since the major parties had agreed not to contest by-elections when vacancies arose in seats held by the other parties; contests occurred only when independent candidates or minor parties chose to stand.

== See also ==
- West Bromwich (UK Parliament constituency)
- 1963 West Bromwich by-election
- 1973 West Bromwich by-election
- The town of West Bromwich
- Lists of United Kingdom by-elections
