= 1963 West Bromwich by-election =

UK parliamentary by-election

The 1963 West Bromwich by-election was a by-election held for the British House of Commons constituency of West Bromwich in Staffordshire on 4 July 1963. It was won by the Labour Party candidate Maurice Foley.

== Vacancy ==
The seat had become vacant when the sitting Labour Member of Parliament (MP), John Dugdale had died at the age of 58 on 23 March 1963. He had held the seat since a by-election in 1941.

== Candidates ==
The Labour Party candidate was 37-year-old Maurice Foley. The Conservative candidate was Mr G. Hawkins, and the Liberal Party — which had not contested the seat since 1929 — fielded N. R. W. Mawle.

== Result ==
The result was a victory for the Labour candidate, Maurice Foley, who took the seat with a slightly increased share of the vote. He held the seat until his resignation in 1973.

West Bromwich by-election, 1963
Party	Candidate	Votes	%	±%
Labour	Maurice Foley	20,510	58.7	+1.3
Conservative	George Hawkins	8,246	26.5	−16.1
Liberal	N. R. W. Mawle	6,161	17.6	New
Majority		12,264	35.2	+20.4
Turnout		34,917		
Labour hold		Swing		

== Last result ==
General election 1959: West Bromwich
Party	Candidate	Votes	%	±%
Labour	John Dugdale	26,702	57.4	−4.2
Conservative	Anthony Hubert Windrum	19,809	42.6	+4.4
Majority		6,893	14.8	−8.8
Turnout		46,511	72.6	+2.4
Labour hold		Swing	−4.2	

== See also ==
- West Bromwich (UK Parliament constituency)
- West Bromwich
- 1941 West Bromwich by-election
- 1973 West Bromwich by-election
- List of United Kingdom by-elections

== Sources ==
- British Parliamentary by-elections: West Bromwich 1963
- 1959 general election results at Richard Kimber's political science resources
- Leigh Rayment's Historical List of MPs
