= The Railway Man =

Railwayman or The Railway Man may refer to:

- Railwayman, a person who works in rail transport
- The Railway Man (book), an autobiography by Eric Lomax, published in 1995
- The Railway Man (film), a film adaptation of the book, starring Colin Firth and Nicole Kidman
- The Railwayman (periodical), publication by the Department of Railways New South Wales, Australia
- The Railway Men, a 2023 Netflix series
- Lech Poznań, a Polish professional football club nicknamed the Railwayman

== See also ==
- The Railwaymen (disambiguation), nickname of multiple football clubs
- The Railway Station Man, a 1992 film
