= West Bromwich (constituency) =

UK Parliament constituency (1885–1974, 2024 onwards)

- Former borough constituency for the House of Commons
- Boundary of West Bromwich in West Midlands region
- Major settlements: West Bromwich, Oldbury, Rowley Regis

1885–February 1974
- Seats: One
- Created from: Wednesbury
- Replaced by: West Bromwich East, West Bromwich West

2024–present
- Created from: West Bromwich East, West Bromwich West

West Bromwich is a borough constituency represented in the House of Commons of the Parliament of the United Kingdom by Sarah Coombes of the Labour Party since 2024.

The seat centres on West Bromwich, in the West Midlands. It was originally established in 1885 but was abolished in 1974. Further to the completion of the 2023 Periodic Review of Westminster constituencies, the seat was re-established for the 2024 general election.

== Boundaries ==
1885–1918: The municipal borough of West Bromwich.

1918–1974: The County Borough of West Bromwich.

2024–present: The Metropolitan Borough of Sandwell wards of: Charlemont with Grove Vale; Great Barr with Yew Tree; Greets Green and Lyng; Newton; Oldbury; Rowley; Tividale; West Bromwich Central.

The revived seat comprises the majority of the abolished West Bromwich East seat, together with the Oldbury and Tividale wards from West Bromwich West and the Rowley ward from Halesowen and Rowley Regis (both also abolished).

== History ==
The constituency was created by the Redistribution of Seats Act 1885 for the 1885 general election. It was abolished for the February 1974 general election, when it was divided into West Bromwich East and West Bromwich West. Most of the original West Bromwich constituency formed the new West Bromwich East constituency, while the new West Bromwich West constituency consisted largely of Tipton and Wednesbury - both of which had been added to an expanded West Bromwich borough in 1966. In 1974, just after the February general election, the borough of West Bromwich ceased to exist when it merged with the short-lived County Borough of Warley (which was centred on Oldbury, Smethwick and Rowley Regis) to form Sandwell.

== Members of Parliament ==
=== MPs 1885–1974 ===
| Election | Member | Party | Notes |
|---|---|---|---|
| 1885 | John Horton Blades | Liberal | |
| 1886 | Sir Ernest Spencer | Conservative | |
| 1906 | Alfred Hazel | Liberal | |
| Jan 1910 | William Legge | Conservative | |
| 1918 | Frederick Roberts | Labour | |
| 1931 | Alexander Ramsay | Conservative | |
| 1935 | Frederick Roberts | Labour | Resigned 1941 |
| 1941 by-election | John Dugdale | Labour | Died March 1963 |
| 1963 by-election | Maurice Foley | Labour | Resigned 1973 |
| 1973 by-election | Betty Boothroyd | Labour | Subsequently, MP for West Bromwich West; later Speaker of the House of Commons |
| Feb 1974 | constituency abolished: see West Bromwich East and West Bromwich West | | |

=== MPs since 2024 ===
| Election | Member | Party | Notes |
|---|---|---|---|
| 2024 | Sarah Coombes | Labour | |

== Elections ==
=== Elections in the 2020s ===
General election 2024: West Bromwich
| Party | Candidate | Votes | % | ±% |
|---|---|---|---|---|
| Labour | Sarah Coombes | 16,872 | 46.2 | +4.1 |
| Conservative | Will Goodhand | 7,318 | 20.1 | −27.2 |
| Reform UK | Ray Nock | 7,101 | 19.5 | +15.7 |
| Green | Gita Joshi | 2,036 | 5.6 | +3.7 |
| Independent | Mohammed Yasin | 1,707 | 4.7 | N/A |
| Liberal Democrats | Parmjit Singh Gill | 1,314 | 3.6 | +0.1 |
| UKIP | Sam Harding | 133 | 0.4 | N/A |
| Majority | | 9,554 | 26.1 | |
| Turnout | | 36,481 | 49.2 | |
| Labour win (new seat) | | | | |

== Elections 1885–February 1974 ==
=== Elections in the 1880s ===
General election 1885: West Bromwich
| Party | Candidate | Votes | % | ±% |
|---|---|---|---|---|
| Liberal | John Horton Blades | 3,988 | 55.7 | |
| Conservative | Ernest Spencer | 3,171 | 44.3 | |
| Majority | | 817 | 11.4 | |
| Turnout | | 7,159 | 81.8 | |
| Registered electors | | 8,749 | | |
| Liberal win (new seat) | | | | |

Ernest Spencer

General election 1886: West Bromwich
| Party | Candidate | Votes | % | ±% |
|---|---|---|---|---|
| Conservative | Ernest Spencer | 3,660 | 54.2 | +9.9 |
| Liberal | Thomas James Moore | 3,091 | 45.8 | −9.9 |
| Majority | | 569 | 8.4 | N/A |
| Turnout | | 6,751 | 77.2 | −4.6 |
| Registered electors | | 8,749 | | |
| Conservative gain from Liberal | | Swing | +9.9 | |

=== Elections in the 1890s ===
General election 1892: West Bromwich
| Party | Candidate | Votes | % | ±% |
|---|---|---|---|---|
| Conservative | Ernest Spencer | 4,474 | 56.6 | +2.4 |
| Liberal | Thomas Lee Roberts | 3,429 | 43.4 | −2.4 |
| Majority | | 1,045 | 13.2 | +4.8 |
| Turnout | | 7,903 | 86.1 | +8.9 |
| Registered electors | | 9,174 | | |
| Conservative hold | | Swing | +2.4 | |

General election 1895: West Bromwich
| Party | Candidate | Votes | % | ±% |
|---|---|---|---|---|
| Conservative | Ernest Spencer | Unopposed | | |
| Conservative hold | | | | |

=== Elections in the 1900s ===
General election 1900: West Bromwich
| Party | Candidate | Votes | % | ±% |
|---|---|---|---|---|
| Conservative | Ernest Spencer | Unopposed | | |
| Conservative hold | | | | |

Alfred Hazel

General election 1906: West Bromwich
| Party | Candidate | Votes | % | ±% |
|---|---|---|---|---|
| Liberal | Alfred Hazel | 5,475 | 56.2 | New |
| Conservative | William Legge | 4,259 | 43.8 | N/A |
| Majority | | 1,216 | 12.4 | N/A |
| Turnout | | 9,734 | 90.8 | N/A |
| Registered electors | | 10,726 | | |
| Liberal gain from Conservative | | Swing | N/A | |

=== Elections in the 1910s ===
General election January 1910: West Bromwich
| Party | Candidate | Votes | % | ±% |
|---|---|---|---|---|
| Conservative | William Legge | 5,672 | 53.5 | +9.7 |
| Liberal | Alfred Hazel | 4,937 | 46.5 | −9.7 |
| Majority | | 735 | 7.0 | N/A |
| Turnout | | 10,609 | 93.9 | +3.1 |
| Registered electors | | 11,299 | | |
| Conservative hold | | Swing | +9.7 | |

General election December 1910: West Bromwich
| Party | Candidate | Votes | % | ±% |
|---|---|---|---|---|
| Conservative | William Legge | 5,010 | 50.0 | −3.5 |
| Liberal | Alfred Hazel | 5,008 | 50.0 | +3.5 |
| Majority | | 2 | 0.0 | −7.0 |
| Turnout | | 10,018 | 88.7 | −5.2 |
| Registered electors | | 11,299 | | |
| Unionist hold | | Swing | −3.5 | |

A petition was lodged regarding this election but was later dismissed. The first count had Legge on 5,046 votes, while Hazel had 5,041 votes. A recount put Legge on 5,029 votes, while Hazel had 4,987 votes. Further scrutiny led to the above results.

General Election 1914–15:

Another General Election was required to take place before the end of 1915. The political parties had been making preparations for an election to take place and by July 1914, the following candidates had been selected;

- Unionist: William Legge
- Liberal: Alfred Hazel

General election 1918: West Bromwich
| Party | | Candidate | Votes | % | ±% |
|---|---|---|---|---|---|
| | Labour | Frederick Roberts | 11,572 | 54.0 | New |
| C | Unionist | William Legge | 9,863 | 46.0 | −4.0 |
| Majority | | | 1,709 | 8.0 | N/A |
| Turnout | | | 21,435 | 65.4 | −23.3 |
| Registered electors | | | 32,777 | | |
| | Labour gain from Unionist | | Swing | | |
C indicates candidate endorsed by the coalition government.

Liberal candidate Alfred Hazel withdrew at the last minute

=== Elections in the 1920s ===
General election 1922: West Bromwich
| Party | Candidate | Votes | % | ±% |
|---|---|---|---|---|
| Labour | Frederick Roberts | 14,210 | 50.6 | −3.4 |
| Unionist | Herbert Edgar Parkes | 11,263 | 40.1 | −4.9 |
| Liberal | Aneurin Edwards | 2,622 | 9.3 | New |
| Majority | | 2,947 | 10.5 | +2.5 |
| Turnout | | 28,095 | 85.7 | +20.3 |
| Registered electors | | 32,768 | | |
| Labour hold | | Swing | +0.8 | |

General election 1923: West Bromwich
| Party | Candidate | Votes | % | ±% |
|---|---|---|---|---|
| Labour | Frederick Roberts | 12,910 | 44.8 | −5.8 |
| Unionist | Herbert Edgar Parkes | 11,146 | 38.7 | −1.4 |
| Liberal | Aneurin Edwards | 4,749 | 16.5 | +7.2 |
| Majority | | 1,764 | 6.1 | −4.4 |
| Turnout | | 28,805 | 85.0 | −0.7 |
| Registered electors | | 33,898 | | |
| Labour hold | | Swing | −2.2 | |

General election 1924: West Bromwich
| Party | Candidate | Votes | % | ±% |
|---|---|---|---|---|
| Labour | Frederick Roberts | 15,384 | 51.6 | +6.8 |
| Unionist | Henry Archibald Roger Graham | 14,413 | 48.4 | +9.7 |
| Majority | | 971 | 3.2 | −2.9 |
| Turnout | | 29,797 | 86.5 | +1.5 |
| Registered electors | | 34,503 | | |
| Labour hold | | Swing | −1.5 | |

General election 1929: West Bromwich
| Party | Candidate | Votes | % | ±% |
|---|---|---|---|---|
| Labour | Frederick Roberts | 19,621 | 52.1 | +0.5 |
| Unionist | J I Chesshire | 10,943 | 29.0 | −19.4 |
| Liberal | William Ramage | 7,119 | 18.9 | New |
| Majority | | 8,678 | 23.1 | +19.9 |
| Turnout | | 37,683 | 83.1 | −3.4 |
| Registered electors | | 45,371 | | |
| Labour hold | | Swing | +10.0 | |

=== Elections in the 1930s ===
General election 1931: West Bromwich
| Party | Candidate | Votes | % | ±% |
|---|---|---|---|---|
| Conservative | Alexander Ramsay | 17,729 | 45.71 | |
| Labour | Frederick Roberts | 17,204 | 44.36 | |
| Liberal | William Ramage | 3,851 | 9.93 | |
| Majority | | 525 | 1.35 | N/A |
| Turnout | | 38,784 | 81.66 | |
| Conservative gain from Labour | | Swing | | |

General election 1935: West Bromwich
| Party | Candidate | Votes | % | ±% |
|---|---|---|---|---|
| Labour | Frederick Roberts | 19,113 | 51.26 | |
| Conservative | Robert Ashton | 18,175 | 48.74 | |
| Majority | | 938 | 2.52 | N/A |
| Turnout | | 37,288 | 74.80 | |
| Labour gain from Conservative | | Swing | | |

=== Elections in the 1940s ===
1941 West Bromwich by-election
| Party | Candidate | Votes | % | ±% |
|---|---|---|---|---|
| Labour | John Dugdale | Unopposed | N/A | N/A |
| Labour hold | | | | |

General election 1945: West Bromwich
| Party | Candidate | Votes | % | ±% |
|---|---|---|---|---|
| Labour | John Dugdale | 27,979 | 69.9 | +18.6 |
| Conservative | Gerald Nabarro | 12,028 | 30.1 | −18.6 |
| Majority | | 15,951 | 39.8 | +37.3 |
| Turnout | | 40,007 | 72.5 | −2.3 |
| Labour hold | | Swing | +18.6 | |

- Changes are calculated against the results of the 1935 general election, rather than the uncontested 1941 by-election

=== Elections in the 1950s ===
General election 1950: West Bromwich
| Party | Candidate | Votes | % | ±% |
|---|---|---|---|---|
| Labour | John Dugdale | 31,564 | 65.40 | |
| Conservative | William Ward | 16,697 | 34.60 | |
| Majority | | 14,867 | 30.80 | |
| Turnout | | 48,261 | 82.84 | |
| Labour hold | | Swing | | |

General election 1951: West Bromwich
| Party | Candidate | Votes | % | ±% |
|---|---|---|---|---|
| Labour | John Dugdale | 30,845 | 64.22 | |
| Conservative | Gordon D Johnstone | 17,186 | 35.78 | |
| Majority | | 13,659 | 28.44 | |
| Turnout | | 48,031 | 80.51 | |
| Labour hold | | Swing | | |

General election 1955: West Bromwich
| Party | Candidate | Votes | % | ±% |
|---|---|---|---|---|
| Labour | John Dugdale | 26,242 | 61.80 | |
| Conservative | Francis John Vernon Hereward Dashwood, 11th Baronet | 16,222 | 38.20 | |
| Majority | | 10,020 | 23.60 | |
| Turnout | | 42,464 | 70.21 | |
| Labour hold | | Swing | | |

General election 1959: West Bromwich
| Party | Candidate | Votes | % | ±% |
|---|---|---|---|---|
| Labour | John Dugdale | 26,702 | 57.4 | −4.4 |
| Conservative | Anthony Hubert Windrum | 19,809 | 42.6 | +4.4 |
| Majority | | 6,893 | 14.8 | −8.8 |
| Turnout | | 46,511 | 72.6 | +2.4 |
| Labour hold | | Swing | −4.2 | |

=== Elections in the 1960s ===
1963 West Bromwich by-election
| Party | Candidate | Votes | % | ±% |
|---|---|---|---|---|
| Labour | Maurice Foley | 20,510 | 58.7 | +1.3 |
| Conservative | George Hawkins | 8,246 | 26.5 | −16.1 |
| Liberal | N. R. W. Mawle | 6,161 | 17.6 | New |
| Majority | | 12,264 | 35.2 | +20.4 |
| Turnout | | 34,917 | | |
| Labour hold | | Swing | | |

General election 1964: West Bromwich
| Party | Candidate | Votes | % | ±% |
|---|---|---|---|---|
| Labour | Maurice Foley | 22,942 | 55.1 | −2.3 |
| Conservative | George Hawkins | 18,664 | 44.9 | +2.3 |
| Majority | | 4,278 | 10.2 | −4.6 |
| Turnout | | 41,606 | 64.7 | −7.9 |
| Labour hold | | Swing | | |

General election 1966: West Bromwich
| Party | Candidate | Votes | % | ±% |
|---|---|---|---|---|
| Labour | Maurice Foley | 25,287 | 57.9 | +2.8 |
| Conservative | George Hawkins | 18,413 | 42.1 | −2.8 |
| Majority | | 6,874 | 15.8 | +5.6 |
| Turnout | | 43,700 | 68.8 | +4.1 |
| Labour hold | | Swing | | |

=== Elections in the 1970s ===
General election 1970: West Bromwich
| Party | Candidate | Votes | % | ±% |
|---|---|---|---|---|
| Labour | Maurice Foley | 23,412 | 55.2 | −2.7 |
| Conservative | George Hawkins | 18,976 | 44.8 | +2.7 |
| Majority | | 4,436 | 10.4 | −5.4 |
| Turnout | | 42,388 | 62.07 | −6.7 |
| Labour hold | | Swing | | |

By-election 1973: West Bromwich
| Party | Candidate | Votes | % | ±% |
|---|---|---|---|---|
| Labour | Betty Boothroyd | 15,907 | 53.21 | −2.02 |
| Conservative | David Bell | 7,582 | 25.36 | −19.41 |
| National Front | Martin Webster | 4,789 | 16.02 | New |
| Independent | Joshua Churchman | 1,616 | 5.41 | New |
| Majority | | 8,325 | 27.85 | |
| Turnout | | 29,894 | 43.6 | −18.5 |
| Labour hold | | Swing | | |
