= Sound Seekers =

British charity

Sound Seekers (formally known as the Commonwealth Society for the Deaf) was a British charity which works to improve the lives of deaf children and children with ear diseases in the developing countries of the Commonwealth of Nations. It provided specialist equipment, training and support to some of the poorest countries of the world, where people with the 'hidden disability' of deafness may otherwise not receive the help they need. In 2020, Sound Seekers merged with DeafKidz International, with the combined charity using the DeafKidz International name.

== History ==
Sound Seekers, formerly known as The Commonwealth Society for the Deaf, sprang from humble beginnings in 1959, initiated by Lady Templer (Edith Margery (Peggie) Davie), the wife of Gerald Templer the Governor of Malaya (now Malaysia), whose time there inspired her to assemble a group of ENT surgeons, audiologists, and educators of the deaf. She convinced them to travel back with her to Malaysia to offer their help to children affected by hearing loss and ear disease. They were able to buy a house in Penang, and a British teacher of the deaf, Joyce Hickes, volunteered to start a school. When she returned to England, she telephoned the Royal Commonwealth Society for the Blind to ask for advice about extending the work, only to be told that the M.P. John Dugdale had asked the same thing a week before. They subsequently met and decided to form the Commonwealth Society for the Deaf.

The first thirty years of the organisation's existence saw it operate at a comparatively low level of activity, carrying out focused pieces of research into deafness and sending small working groups of volunteers overseas to provide several weeks of practical assistance per year. Sound Seekers are now a well-established international NGO, and one of the few in the sector to be working internationally to help those with hearing loss, with the aim of building capacity of the countries we work in to deal with hearing loss in the future.

== Work ==
360 million people have disabling hearing loss across the world – 32 million of which are children – making up about 5% of the world's population. In developing countries, these people often have no access to basic hearing assessment, treatment, medicines or even transport to what limited facilities there are – let alone hearing aids. The first contact they might have with any kind of audiological specialist is sometimes provided by a Sound Seekers project.

Sound Seekers works in the following ways:

- Establishing and improving audiology services in developing countries of the Commonwealth to screen for, and treat, hearing loss and ear disease
- Providing HARK! (Hearing Assessment and Research Centre) mobile earcare clinics which deliver outreach audiology and ear disease treatment services as part of community healthcare programmes
- Supplying support to schools and associations for the deaf
- Training rural clinic technicians in audiology and audiology equipment maintenance, including the maintenance of hearing aids
- Informing rural communities about 'good ear health'
- Managing volunteers to go out and assist on projects

Sound Seekers has previously supported work all over the Commonwealth and currently focuses all of its projects in Africa, including countries such as Malawi, Zambia and The Gambia, working in partnership with a variety of schools and hospitals across the working countries.

== Projects ==
Cameroon

Sound Seekers is working with Mbingo Baptist Hospital – the second largest healthcare provider in Cameroon – to establish a basic audiology service. They sponsored a Cameroonian nurse to study a one-year diploma in Clinical Audiology and Public Health Ontology at the University of Nairobi, and has since returned to lead the audiology services at Mbingo. As well as supporting the hospital with general audiology equipment, such as hearing aids and ear moulds, it has also aided in arranging the hosting of Professor King Chung from Northern Illinois University. They hope to establish more links between the university and the hospital in the future.

The Gambia

The provision of a HARK vehicle is one of a number of ways that Sound Seekers is involved in The Gambia, allowing a medical team to undertake outreach audiology services in locations that would otherwise be difficult to access. As well as this, a static audiology service was set up at St. John's School for the Deaf – the only school of its kind in the country. They also aid Bansang Hospital in the East of the country, supporting the development of ear and hearing health services at the hospital.

Kenya

In Kenya, Sound Seekers is involved with the University of Nairobi to help deliver the Audiology Diploma Course, working closely with the course director and a consultant ENT specialist to deliver the diploma. Sound Seekers' partnership with the UCL Ear Institute will allow the University of Nairobi to benefit from their expertise, distance learning and connections to industry.

Malawi

After sponsoring two Malawian candidates through the Clinical Audiology and Public Health Ontology diploma at the University of Nairobi, both are now using their skills at Queen Elizabeth Central Hospital in Blantyre, where they have set up a basic audiology unit. The hospital also runs weekly HARK outreach clinics in Southern Malawi.The ABC Training Clinic in Lilongwe is something that Sound Seekers is also involved in, where they have received a new HARK vehicle to undertake outreach in Central Malawi.

Sound Seekers have also aided the set up of a teleaudiology service in Malawi, with the Queen Elizabeth Central Hospital now able to benefit from qualified audiologists in Lilongwe and Zambia, receiving improve patient management and technical support.

Sierra Leone

Working closely with St. Joseph's School for the Hearing Impaired in Makeni, Northern Province of Sierra Leone, Sound Seekers has set up a targeted audiological screening project with the help of an in-house audiologist at the school. In partnership with Holy Spirit Hospital and Loreto Clinic in Makeni, this project allows the screening and identifying of children particularly at risk of developing hearing loss, meaning they can receive the required medication and prevent delay to their education.

Zambia

With only one audiologist in a country of 14 million people, Alfred Mwamba works for Sound Seekers on a part-time basis, helping train a team of people at Ndola Central Hospital in the Copperbelt Region of Zambia. As well as sponsoring a Zambian clinical officer to study the Clinical Audiology and Public Health Ontology diploma at the University of Nairobi, Sound Seekers also provided a HARK vehicle for usage in outreach programs, as well as helped set up a teleaudiology link between Mwamba with his team in Ndola and to Malawi from his base in Lusaka.
