= 1973 West Bromwich by-election =

UK parliamentary by-election

← 1970	24 May 1973

Constituency of West Bromwich
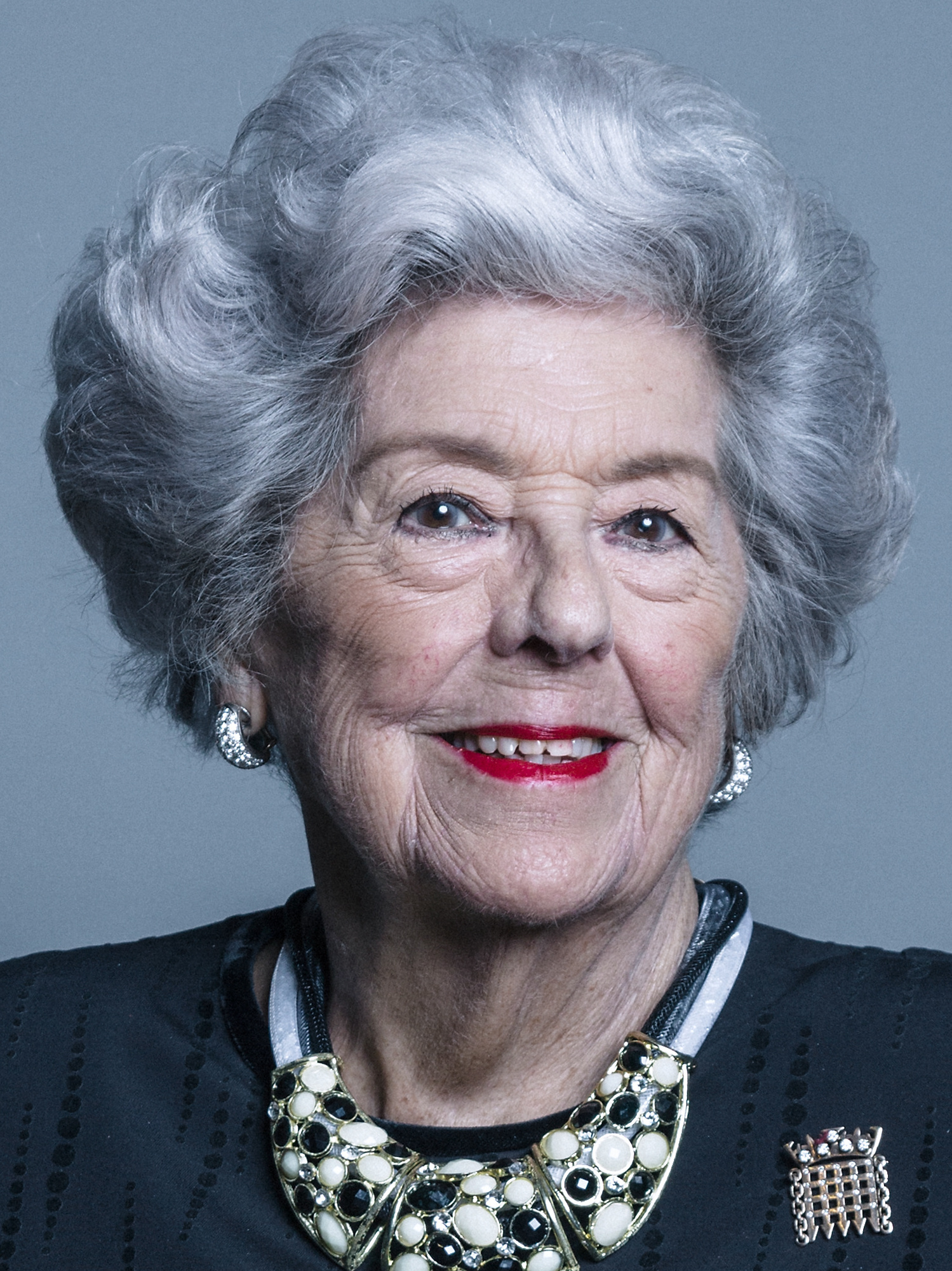
	First party	Second party
		Con
Candidate	Betty Boothroyd	David Bell
Party	Labour	Conservative
Popular vote	15,907	7,582
Percentage	53.21%	25.36%
Swing	▼2.02%	▼19.41%
	Third party	Fourth party
	NF	Ind.
Candidate	Martin Webster	Joshua Churchman
Party	National Front	Independent
Popular vote	4,789	1,616
Percentage	16.02%	5.41%
Swing	N/A	N/A
MP before election
Maurice Foley
Labour
Subsequent MP
Betty Boothroyd
Labour

The 1973 West Bromwich by-election of 24 May 1973 was held following the appointment of Labour Member of Parliament (MP) Maurice Foley to the European Commission. The constituency, held continuously by Labour since 1935, was retained in this by-election.

== Campaign ==
The election campaign was noted for the refusal of Enoch Powell, MP for neighbouring Wolverhampton South West, to endorse Conservative candidate David Bell; he felt that Bell was too far removed from his own policies on immigration and United Kingdom membership of the European Communities. Although Powell did not endorse any candidate, the National Front (NF) claimed that Powell's refusal to support Bell represented tacit endorsement of itself. On polling day Martin Webster captured 16% of the vote, an all-time high for the NF, which thereby saved its deposit.

In common with a number of by-elections at the time, the Liberal Party did not compete for this seat.

== Result ==
West Bromwich by-election, 1973
Party	Candidate	Votes	%	±%
Labour	Betty Boothroyd	15,907	53.21	−2.02
Conservative	David Bell	7,582	25.36	−19.41
National Front	Martin Webster	4,789	16.02	New
Independent	Joshua Churchman	1,616	5.41	New
Majority		8,325	27.85	
Turnout		29,894	43.6	
Labour hold		Swing		

== See also ==
- West Bromwich (UK Parliament constituency)
- 1941 West Bromwich by-election
- 1963 West Bromwich by-election
- The town of West Bromwich
- Lists of United Kingdom by-elections
