= Sandwell Metropolitan Borough Council elections =

Local government elections in Sandwell, England

Sandwell Borough Council elections are held three years out of every four, with a third of the council elected each time. Sandwell Metropolitan Borough Council is the local authority for the metropolitan borough of Sandwell in the West Midlands, England. Since the last boundary changes in 2026, 72 councillors have been elected from 24 wards.

== Election results ==
Composition of the council
Year	Labour	Conservative	Liberal Democrats (Note: Includes totals for the predecessors of the Liberal Democrats, the Liberal Party and SDP (both of which participated in the Alliance).)	BNP	Reform UK	Independents & Others	Council control after election
Local government reorganisation; council established (90 seats)
1973	67	23	0	0	0	0	Labour
1975	58	32	0	0	0	0	Labour
1976	51	39	0	0	0	0	Labour
1978	41	46	0	0	0	3	Conservative
New ward boundaries (72 seats)
1979	53	19	0	0	0	0	Labour
1980	54	17	1	0	0	0	Labour
1982	54	15	3	0	0	0	Labour
1983	54	13	5	0	0	0	Labour
1984	53	13	6	0	0	0	Labour
1986	55	11	6	0	0	0	Labour
1987	56	12	3	0	0	1	Labour
1988	57	13	0	0	0	2	Labour
1990	57	12	3	0	0	0	Labour
1991	50	16	6	0	0	0	Labour
1992	42	24	6	0	0	0	Labour
1994	43	22	7	0	0	0	Labour
1995	48	17	7	0	0	0	Labour
1996	60	2	9	0	0	1	Labour
1998	60	2	9	0	0	1	Labour
1999	61	2	9	0	0	0	Labour
2000	55	6	10	0	0	1	Labour
2002	56	9	6	0	0	2	Labour
2003	55	9	6	2	0	0	Labour
New ward boundaries (72 seats)
2004	53	12	6	1	0	0	Labour
2006	50	11	5	4	0	2	Labour
2007	51	10	6	4	0	1 (Note: 1 vacant seat)	Labour
2008	49	14	5	2	0	2	Labour
2010	56	12	4	0	0	0	Labour
2011	58	9	3	0	0	2 (Note: 1 Independent, 1 Independent Socialist)	Labour
2012	68	2	0	0	0	2	Labour
2014	70	1	0	0	0	1 (Note: 1 UKIP)	Labour
2015	69	0	0	0	0	3 (Note: 2 Independents, 1 UKIP)	Labour
2016	71	0	0	0	0	1	Labour
2018	72	0	0	0	0	0	Labour
2019	72	0	0	0	0	0	Labour
2021	58	9	0	0	0	4	Labour
2022	61	9	0	0	0	2	Labour
2023	60	12	0	0	0	0	Labour
2024	64	5	0	0	0	3	Labour
New ward boundaries (72 seats)
2026	28	0	0	0	41	3 (Note: 1 Independent, 2 Green)	Reform

== Council elections ==
- 1998 Sandwell Metropolitan Borough Council election
- 1999 Sandwell Metropolitan Borough Council election
- 2000 Sandwell Metropolitan Borough Council election
- 2002 Sandwell Metropolitan Borough Council election
- 2003 Sandwell Metropolitan Borough Council election
- 2004 Sandwell Metropolitan Borough Council election (whole council elected after boundary changes)
- 2006 Sandwell Metropolitan Borough Council election
- 2007 Sandwell Metropolitan Borough Council election
- 2008 Sandwell Metropolitan Borough Council election
- 2010 Sandwell Metropolitan Borough Council election
- 2011 Sandwell Metropolitan Borough Council election
- 2012 Sandwell Metropolitan Borough Council election
- 2014 Sandwell Metropolitan Borough Council election
- 2015 Sandwell Metropolitan Borough Council election
- 2016 Sandwell Metropolitan Borough Council election
- 2018 Sandwell Metropolitan Borough Council election
- 2019 Sandwell Metropolitan Borough Council election
- 2021 Sandwell Metropolitan Borough Council election
- 2022 Sandwell Metropolitan Borough Council election
- 2023 Sandwell Metropolitan Borough Council election
- 2024 Sandwell Metropolitan Borough Council election
- 2026 Sandwell Metropolitan Borough Council election (whole council elected after boundary changes)

== Borough result maps ==
2004 results map

2006 results map

2007 results map

2008 results map

2010 results map

2011 results map

2012 results map

2014 results map

2015 results map

2016 results map

2018 results map

2019 results map

2021 results map

2022 results map

2023 results map

2024 results map

2026 results map

== By-election results ==
=== 1994–1998 ===
Hateley Heath By-Election 10 July 1997
Party	Candidate	Votes	%	±%
Labour		481	48.1	−21.4
Liberal Democrats		288	28.8	+15.6
Conservative		144	14.4	−2.9
National Democrats		70	7.0	+7.0
Socialist		16	1.6	+1.6
Majority		193	19.3	
Turnout		999	10.2	
Labour hold		Swing		

Blackheath By-Election 23 October 1997
Party	Candidate	Votes	%	±%
Labour		1,053	71.0	−6.2
Liberal Democrats		283	19.1	+19.1
Conservative		148	10.0	−12.8
Majority		770	51.9	
Turnout		1,484	15.6	
Labour hold		Swing		

=== 1998–2002 ===
Rowley By-Election 22 October 1998
Party	Candidate	Votes	%	±%
Labour	Barbara Price	831	57.3	+0.3
Independent	Fred Hadley	423	29.2	−13.8
Conservative	Fredric Powles	104	7.2	+7.2
Liberal Democrats	Julai Garrett	91	6.3	+6.3
Majority		408	28.1	
Turnout		1,449		
Labour hold		Swing		

Hateley Heath By-Election 15 July 1999
Party	Candidate	Votes	%	±%
Labour	Joyce Edis	558	44.4	−9.8
Liberal Democrats	Rachel Cheeseman	483	38.5	+8.1
Conservative	Raymond Nock	215	17.1	+1.8
Majority		75	5.9	
Turnout		1,256	13.6	
Labour hold		Swing		

Bristnall By-Election 26 August 1999
Party	Candidate	Votes	%	±%
Labour	Malcolm Bridges	781	56.8	−4.8
Conservative	Nicholas Meacham	452	32.8	+4.2
Liberal Democrats	Mark Handy	143	10.4	+0.6
Majority		329	24.0	
Turnout		1,376	14.3	
Labour hold		Swing		

Hately Heath By-Election 18 November 1999
Party	Candidate	Votes	%	±%
Liberal Democrats	Rachael Cheeseman	573	48.6	+18.2
Labour	Michael Davies	466	39.5	−14.7
Conservative	Raymond Nock	141	11.9	−3.4
Majority		107	9.1	
Turnout		1,180	12.7	
Liberal Democrats gain from Labour		Swing		

St. Pauls By-Election 18 November 1999
Party	Candidate	Votes	%	±%
Independent	Kazi Rahman	907	50.6	+18.0
Labour	Jasbir Gill	731	40.8	−11.1
Conservative	Ewart Johnson	113	6.3	−5.1
Liberal Democrats	Roger Prior	39	2.2	−1.9
Majority		176	9.8	
Turnout		1,790	21.9	
Independent gain from Labour		Swing		

Rowley By-Election 7 June 2001
Party	Candidate	Votes	%	±%
Labour	Iris Boucher	3,142	63.1	+7.4
Conservative	David Gill	1,313	26.4	−1.9
Liberal Democrats	Walter Bowdler	528	10.6	+10.6
Majority		1,829	36.7	
Turnout		4,984		
Labour hold		Swing		

Wednesbury North By-Election 6 September 2001
Party	Candidate	Votes	%	±%
Conservative	Frank Betteridge	1,083	55.7	−6.5
Labour	Elaine Gailes	775	39.8	+2.0
Liberal Democrats	Lynne Yardley	88	4.5	+4.5
Majority		308	15.9	
Turnout		1,946	20.8	
Conservative hold		Swing		

=== 2002–2006 ===
Smethwick By-Election 19 September 2002
Party	Candidate	Votes	%	±%
Labour	Victor Silvester	1,334	66.1	−11.0
Conservative	Amrick Uppal	475	23.5	+0.6
Socialist Labour	Boota singh	210	10.4	+10.4
Majority		859	42.6	
Turnout		2,019	23.8	
Labour hold		Swing		

Old Warley By-Election 25 November 2004
Party	Candidate	Votes	%	±%
Labour	Trevor Crumpton	1,087	42.3	−1.8
Conservative	Leslie Pawlowski	778	30.3	−25.6
BNP	Simon Smith	410	15.9	+15.9
Liberal Democrats	Christopher Reed	293	11.4	+11.4
Majority		309	12.0	
Turnout		2,568	29.2	
Labour gain from Conservative		Swing		

=== 2006–2010 ===
Charlemont with Grove Vale By-Election 28 June 2007
Party	Candidate	Votes	%	±%
Conservative	Raymond Nock	870	34.5	−3.0
Labour	Ralph Perkins	801	31.7	+6.8
BNP	Arthur Copson	544	21.6	+1.3
Liberal Democrats	Martin Roebuck	238	9.4	−7.9
Green	Victoria Dunn	71	2.8	+2.8
Majority		69	2.8	
Turnout		2,524	27.4	
Conservative hold		Swing		

Princes End By-Election 6 December 2007
Party	Candidate	Votes	%	±%
Labour	Delia Edwards	796	48.1	+12.4
Conservative	Beatrice Owen	517	31.2	+11.4
BNP	Karen Parkes	314	19.0	−15.9
Liberal Democrats	Dorothy Brayshaw	29	1.8	+1.8
Majority		279	16.9	
Turnout		1,656	18.6	
Labour gain from BNP		Swing		

Newton By-Election 24 January 2008
Party	Candidate	Votes	%	±%
Labour	David Hosell	844	36.9	+2.6
Liberal Democrats	Michaela Allcock	809	35.4	−6.9
Conservative	Valerie Ward	587	25.7	+2.3
Green	David Hawkins	45	2.0	+2.0
Majority		35	1.5	
Turnout		2,285	25.9	
Labour gain from Liberal Democrats		Swing		

Wednesbury South By-Election 1 October 2009
Party	Candidate	Votes	%	±%
Labour	Olwen Jones	1,006	45.1	+6.7
Conservative	Mike Warner	946	42.4	+1.6
Liberal Democrats	Dorothy Brayshaw	168	7.5	+7.5
Green	Colin Bye	109	4.9	−0.2
Majority		60	2.7	
Turnout		2,229	23.5	
Labour hold		Swing		

=== 2010–2014 ===
Wednesbury North By-Election 18 November 2010
Party	Candidate	Votes	%	±%
Labour	Peter Hughes	1,322	62.1	+23.9
Conservative	Mike Warner	643	30.2	−9.0
National Front	Ade Woodhouse	76	3.6	+3.6
Liberal Democrats	Mary Wilson	45	2.1	−8.4
Green	Colin Bye	42	2.9	+2.0
Majority		679	31.9	
Turnout		2,128	21.4	
Labour gain from Conservative		Swing		

=== 2014–2018 ===
Newton By-Election 9 July 2015
Party	Candidate	Votes	%	±%
Labour	Keith Allcock	1,152	59.1	+11.1
Conservative	Tony Ward	452	23.2	−5.6
UKIP	Steve Latham	310	15.9	−7.3
Green	Murray Abbott	36	1.8	+1.8
Majority		700	35.9	
Turnout		1,950		
Labour hold		Swing		

Blackheath By-Election 10 September 2015
Party	Candidate	Votes	%	±%
Labour	Danny Millard	915	51.4	+7.0
Conservative	Shirley Ching	544	30.5	−0.6
UKIP	Ian Keeling	287	16.1	−8.4
Green	Ben Groom	35	2.0	+2.0
Majority		371	20.8	
Turnout		1,781		
Labour hold		Swing		

=== 2018–2022 ===
Tividale By-Election 15 July 2021
Party	Candidate	Votes	%	±%
Conservative	Emma Henlan	986	52.6	+20.7
Labour	Robert Hevican	810	43.2	−13.7
Independent	Energy Kutebura	40	2.1	+2.1
Liberal Democrats	Nicolas Bradley	30	1.6	+1.6
TUSC	Richard Gingell	9	0.5	+0.5
Majority		176	9.4	
Turnout		1,878	20.13	
Conservative gain from Labour		Swing	+17.2	

=== 2022–2026 ===
Wednesbury South By-Election 27 October 2022
Party	Candidate	Votes	%	±%
Labour	Jenny Chidley	854	51.3	−6.3
Conservative	Fajli Bibi	654	39.3	−3.1
Liberal Democrats	Manjit Singh Lall	77	4.3	+4.3
Green	Mark Nicholas Redding	56	3.4	+3.4
TUSC	Gareth Knox	23	1.4	+1.4
Majority		200	12.0	−3.2
Turnout		1,664	16.33	−8.8
Labour hold		Swing		
