= 2023 Sandwell Metropolitan Borough Council election =

2023 English local election

← 2022	4 May 2023	2024 →

24 of 72 seats on Sandwell Metropolitan Borough Council 37 seats needed for a majority

	First party	Second party
Leader	Kerrie Carmichael	David Fisher
Party	Labour	Conservative
Last election	21	3
Seats before	57	10
Seats after	60	12
	Third party	Fourth party
Party	Liberal Democrats	Independent
Last election	0	0
Seats before	2	2
Seats after	0	0
- Winner of each seat at the 2023 Sandwell Metropolitan Borough Council election
Leader before election
Kerrie Carmichael
Labour
Leader after election
Labour

The 2023 Sandwell Metropolitan Borough Council elections were held on 4 May 2023 alongside other local elections in the United Kingdom. One third of seats on Sandwell Metropolitan Borough Council are up for election.

Labour retained its majority on the council. Both Labour and the Conservatives gained seats, whilst the Liberal Democrats and independents lost all their seats, leaving only two parties represented on the council after the election.

== Background ==
Sandwell is a consistently Labour council. Labour have held majorities every election since its creation in 1973, apart from 1978 when the Conservatives gained the council. From 2018 to 2021, Sandwell was one of the few councils to be comprised fully of one party, with Labour in control of all 72 wards. In the most recent election in 2022 election Labour lost three seats, while the Conservatives gained three.

The seats up for election this year were last elected in 2019. In that election, Labour won all 24 seats with 58.6% of the vote, giving them full control of the council.

== Previous council composition ==
After 2022 election		Before 2023 election	
Party	Seats	Party	Seats
Labour	61	Labour	57
Conservative	9	Conservative	9
Liberal Democrats	0	Liberal Democrats	2
Independent	2	Independent	2
		vacant	1

== Results summary ==
2023 Sandwell Metropolitan Borough Council election
Party	This election			Full council			This election		
Party	Seats	Net	Seats %	Other	Total	Total %	Votes	Votes %	+/−
Labour	22	▲2	91.7	38	60	83.3	30,656	57.8	+0.3
Conservative	2	▲2	8.3	10	12	16.7	15,091	28.5	–5.9
Green	0	Steady	0.0	0	0	0.0	2,421	4.6	N/A
Liberal Democrats	0	▼2	0.0	0	0	0.0	2,288	4.3	+0.8
Independent	0	▼2	0.0	0	0	0.0	1,387	2.6	–0.9
Reform UK	0	Steady	0.0	0	0	0.0	894	1.7	+1.4
TUSC	0	Steady	0.0	0	0	0.0	253	0.5	±0.0
Yeshua	0	Steady	0.0	0	0	0.0	25	<0.1	–0.1

== Ward results ==
=== Abbey ===
Abbey (1)
Party	Candidate	Votes	%	±%
Labour Co-op	Jennifer Lynn Hemingway	1,586	66.17	−18.2
Green	Roderick Andrew Macrorie	357	14.89	N/A
Conservative	Soran Rauf	271	11.31	−4.1
Liberal Democrats	Lawrence Ngorand	90	3.76	N/A
TUSC	Bob Severn	80	3.34	N/A
Majority		1,229	51.28	
Rejected ballots		13	0.54	
Registered electors		8,484		
Turnout		2,397	28.25	
Labour Co-op gain from Independent				

=== Blackheath ===
Blackheath (1)
Party	Candidate	Votes	%	±%
Labour	Jag Singh	866	47.82	−3.8
Conservative	Greg Stephen Allman	699	38.60	−9.8
Green	Deryn Guest	135	7.46	N/A
Liberal Democrats	Muhammad Ibrar Khan	102	5.63	N/A
Majority		167	9.22	
Rejected ballots		9	0.50	
Registered electors		9,185		
Turnout		1,811	19.72	
Labour hold				

=== Bristnall ===
Bristnall (1)
Party	Candidate	Votes	%	±%
Labour Co-op	Tom Johnston	1,023	50.07	+0.6
Conservative	Mo Sakhi	554	27.12	−11.5
Liberal Democrats	Clive Ernest Heywood	210	10.28	+4.6
Green	Paul Hinton	133	6.51	N/A
Reform UK	Pete Durnell	114	5.58	−.06
Majority		469	22.95	
Rejected ballots		9	0.44	
Registered electors		9,026		
Turnout		2,043	22.63	
Labour Co-op hold				

=== Charlemont with Grove Vale ===
Charlemont with Grove Vale (1)
Party	Candidate	Votes	%	±%
Conservative	Natalie Nadine Weston	1,307	48.62	−2.5
Labour	Elizabeth Ann Giles	1,065	39.62	+0.9
Liberal Democrats	Sadie Laureina Smith	149	5.54	−0.2
Reform UK	Graham Nock	106	3.94	+2.0
TUSC	Owen Lees	49	1.82	N/A
Majority		242	9.00	
Rejected ballots		11	0.41	
Registered electors		9,361		
Turnout		2,688	28.71	
Conservative gain from Labour				

=== Cradley Heath and Old Hill ===
Cradley Heath and Old Hill (1)
Party	Candidate	Votes	%	±%
Labour	John Tipper	1,185	58.12	+0.1
Conservative	Narinder Kaur Garcha	490	24.03	−5.8
Liberal Democrats	Nick Bradley	182	8.93	−0.7
Green	Paul William Connor	168	8.24	N/A
Majority		695	34.09	
Rejected ballots		15	0.74	
Registered electors		10,481		
Turnout		2,039	19.45	
Labour hold				

=== Friar Park ===
Friar Park (1)
Party	Candidate	Votes	%	±%
Labour	Terry Fitzgerald	840	55.23	−0.7
Conservative	Fajli Bibi	529	34.78	−7.4
Reform UK	Robert William White	71	4.67	N/A
Green	Aldo Mussi	48	3.16	N/A
Yeshua	Colin Nicholas Rankine	25	1.64	−0.3
Majority		311	20.45	
Rejected ballots		8	0.52	
Registered electors		8,816		
Turnout		1,521	17.25	
Labour hold				

=== Great Barr with Yew Tree ===
Great Barr with Yew Tree (1)
Party	Candidate	Votes	%	±%
Labour	Kay Allcock	1,292	50.63	+3.5
Conservative	Gurmail Kaur	828	32.44	−8.8
Liberal Democrats	Mark Stephen Pakeman Smith	303	11.87	+0.2
Reform UK	Geoff Sutton	120	4.70	N/A
Majority		464	18.19	
Rejected ballots		9	0.35	
Registered electors		9,789		
Turnout		2,552	26.07	
Labour hold				

=== Great Bridge ===
Great Bridge (1)
Party	Candidate	Votes	%	±%
Labour	Sahdaish Kaur Pall	1,058	50.45	−0.8
Conservative	Connor Daniel Michael Marshall	933	44.49	−4.2
Green	Awais Qaisar	92	4.39	N/A
Majority		125	5.96	
Rejected ballots		14	0.67	
Registered electors		9,809		
Turnout		2,097	21.38	
Labour hold				

=== Greets Green and Lyng ===
Greets Green and Lyng (1)
Party	Candidate	Votes	%	±%
Labour Co-op	Jackie Taylor	1,520	73.64	+10.4
Conservative	Bethany Sears	411	19.91	−16.9
Green	Bryony Morris	124	6.01	N/A
Majority		1,109	53.73	
Rejected ballots		9	0.44	
Registered electors		9,488		
Turnout		2,064	21.75	
Labour Co-op hold				

=== Hateley Heath ===
Hateley Heath (1)
Party	Candidate	Votes	%	±%
Labour	Kay Millar	1,430	70.48	+8.5
Conservative	Nathan Poole	439	21.64	−16.4
Reform UK	Jackie Nock	154	7.59	N/A
Majority		991	48.84	
Rejected ballots		6	0.30	
Registered electors		10,247		
Turnout		2,029	19.80	
Labour hold				

=== Langley ===
Langley (1)
Party	Candidate	Votes	%	±%
Labour	Gillian Ann Tromans	1,126	58.71	+6.9
Conservative	Dean Millard	632	32.95	−3.7
Liberal Democrats	Ejaz Ahmed	141	7.35	−4.1
Majority		494	25.76	
Rejected ballots		19	0.99	
Registered electors		9,528		
Turnout		1,918	20.13	
Labour gain from Independent				

=== Newton ===
Newton (1)
Party	Candidate	Votes	%	±%
Labour Co-op	Sajad Ashraf	1,004	47.07	−11.4
Conservative	Shola Sapara	690	32.35	+1.9
Green	Jeremy David Parker	282	13.22	N/A
Liberal Democrats	Guriqbal Singh	147	6.89	−4.2
Majority		314	14.72	
Rejected ballots		10	0.47	
Registered electors		8,658		
Turnout		2,133	24.64	
Labour Co-op gain from Liberal Democrats				

=== Old Warley ===
Old Warley (1)
Party	Candidate	Votes	%	±%
Labour Co-op	Chipiliro Kalebe-Nyamongo	1,132	41.81	−7.0
Conservative	Paul Michael Smith	1,001	36.98	−2.1
Liberal Democrats	Richard Daniel Jones	481	17.77	+5.6
Reform UK	Karl Terry Leech	77	2.85	N/A
Majority		131	4.83	
Rejected ballots		16	0.59	
Registered electors		9,193		
Turnout		2,707	29.45	
Labour Co-op gain from Liberal Democrats				

=== Oldbury ===
Oldbury (1)
Party	Candidate	Votes	%	±%
Labour	Suzanne Maria Hartwell	1,509	57.46	−1.6
Conservative	Abdul Qayyum	925	35.23	+0.6
Green	Paresh Patel	105	4.00	N/A
TUSC	Richard Gingell	78	2.97	−3.3
Majority		584	22.23	
Rejected ballots		9	0.34	
Registered electors		10,201		
Turnout		2,626	25.74	
Labour hold				

=== Princes End ===
Princes End (1)
Party	Candidate	Votes	%	±%
Conservative	Justyna Kordala	856	47.76	−3.1
Labour Co-op	Sohail Iqbal	784	43.75	−5.3
Reform UK	Chris Clemson	97	5.41	N/A
Green	Joseph Loudon	46	3.08	N/A
Majority		72	4.01	
Rejected ballots		9	0.50	
Registered electors		9,414		
Turnout		1,792	19.04	
Conservative gain from Labour				

=== Rowley ===
Rowley (1)
Party	Candidate	Votes	%	±%
Labour	Khayam Khan	958	49.13	−1.7
Conservative	Steve Hill	640	32.82	−16.4
Independent	David Hulme	162	8.31	N/A
Green	Rudi Sullivan	91	4.67	N/A
Liberal Democrats	Wikas Khan	90	4.62	N/A
Majority		318	16.31	
Rejected ballots		9	0.46	
Registered electors		9,818		
Turnout		1,950	19.86	
Labour hold				

=== Smethwick ===
Smethwick (1)
Party	Candidate	Votes	%	±%
Labour Co-op	Luke John Davies	1,612	76.11	+3.2
Conservative	Imran Qureshi	303	14.31	−12.8
Green	Joshi Gita	184	8.69	N/A
Majority		1,309	61.80	
Rejected ballots		19	0.90	
Registered electors		9,885		
Turnout		2,118	21.43	
Labour Co-op hold				

=== Soho and Victoria ===
Soho and Victoria (1)
Party	Candidate	Votes	%	±%
Labour	Ragih Muflihi	1,924	79.97	+26.3
Conservative	Jomir Ali	261	10.85	+0.4
Green	Jeremy Keith Alexander Rendell	200	8.31	N/A
Majority		1,663	69.12	
Rejected ballots		21	0.87	
Registered electors		10,969		
Turnout		2,406	21.93	
Labour hold				

=== St. Paul's ===
St Paul's (1)
Party	Candidate	Votes	%	±%
Labour	Muhammad Inamullah Loan	2,239	78.07	−4.9
Conservative	Mona Khurana	420	14.64	+3.5
Liberal Democrats	Keith John Wilmot	193	6.73	+0.8
Majority		1,819	63.43	
Rejected ballots		16	0.56	
Registered electors		10,572		
Turnout		2,868	27.13	
Labour hold				

=== Tipton Green ===
Tipton Green (1)
Party	Candidate	Votes	%	±%
Labour	Syeda Amina Khatun	1,472	50.76	+6.3
Independent	Richard James Elessing Jeffcoat	1,225	42.24	+2.8
Conservative	Kam Logani	198	6.83	−9.3
Majority		247	8.52	
Rejected ballots		5	0.17	
Registered electors		10,680		
Turnout		2,900	27.15	
Labour hold				

=== Tividale ===
Tividale (1)
Party	Candidate	Votes	%	±%
Labour	Wakas Younis	923	49.31	+0.4
Conservative	Bhupinder Kullar	767	40.97	−10.1
Green	Jujhar Singh	174	9.29	N/A
Majority		156	8.34	
Rejected ballots		8	0.43	
Registered electors		9,188		
Turnout		1,872	20.37	
Labour hold				

=== Wednesbury North ===
Wednesbury North (1)
Party	Candidate	Votes	%	±%
Labour	Nicola Marie Maycock	1,075	56.55	+3.3
Conservative	Nik Luzaic	581	30.56	−12.9
Green	Mark Redding	127	6.68	N/A
Reform UK	Steve Dabbs	88	4.63	N/A
TUSC	Gareth Knox	24	1.26	−1.9
Majority		494	25.99	
Rejected ballots		6	0.32	
Registered electors		9,244		
Turnout		1,901	20.56	
Labour hold				

=== Wednesbury South ===
Wednesbury South (1)
Party	Candidate	Votes	%	±%
Labour	Kulwant Singh Uppal	1,358	58.61	+1.0
Conservative	Steve Simcox	766	33.06	−9.3
Liberal Democrats	Manjit Sing Lall	94	4.06	N/A
Reform UK	Jack Sabharwal	67	2.89	N/A
TUSC	U'Semu Makaya	22	0.95	N/A
Majority		592	25.55	
Rejected ballots		10	0.43	
Registered electors		10,178		
Turnout		2,317	22.76	
Labour hold				

=== West Bromwich Central ===
West Bromwich Central (1)
Party	Candidate	Votes	%	±%
Labour	Tirath Singh Dhatt	1,675	71.01	+1.2
Conservative	Michael Jones	590	25.01	−5.2
Green	Sarah Deans	155	6.57	N/A
Liberal Democrats	Bob Smith	106	4.49	N/A
Majority		1,085	46.00	
Rejected ballots		13	0.55	
Registered electors		10,278		
Turnout		2,359	24.70	
Labour hold				
