= 2024 Sandwell Metropolitan Borough Council election =

2024 English local election

- 2 May 2024

24 of 72 seats to Sandwell Metropolitan Borough Council 37 seats needed for a majority

	Majority party	Minority party	Third party
Leader	Kerrie Carmichael	David Fisher
Party	Labour	Conservative	Independent
Last election	60 seats, 57.8%	12 seats, 28.5%	0 seats, 2.6%
Seats before	59	8	5
Seats won	22	1	1
Seats after	64	5	3
Seat change	▲5	▼3	▼2
Popular vote	36,990	13,815	2,949
Percentage	56.9%	21.3%	4.5%
Swing	▼0.9%	▼7.2%	▲1.9%
- Winner of each seat at the 2024 Sandwell Metropolitan Borough Council election
Leader before election
Kerrie Carmichael
Labour
Leader after election
Kerrie Carmichael
Labour

The 2024 Sandwell Metropolitan Borough Council elections was held on 2 May 2024 alongside other local elections in the United Kingdom and the 2024 West Midlands mayoral election. One third of seats on Sandwell Metropolitan Borough Council were up for election. The council remained under Labour majority control.

== Background ==
Sandwell is a consistently Labour council, with Labour having held majorities in every election since its creation in 1973, apart from 1978 when the Conservatives gained the council. From 2018 to 2021, Sandwell was one of the few councils to be comprised fully of one party, with Labour in control of all 72 wards. In the previous election in 2023 both Labour and the Conservatives gained two seats each, the councillors on these seats having either switched to the Liberal Democrats or gone independent after the 2022 election.

Both of the parties have lost councillors over the last year. The majority of these have not had the reasons behind publicly revealed. However, it is known that Councillor Jay Anandou left the Conservatives over the rest of his party failing to back his campaign to stop development on the former Brandhall Golf Club. Additionally, two councillors switched from Conservative to Labour, citing a lack of faith in the Conservatives' ability to govern.

After 2023 election		Before 2024 election		After 2024 election	
Party	Seats	Party	Seats	Party	Seats
Labour	60	Labour	59	Labour	64
Conservative	12	Conservative	8	Conservative	5
Independent	0	Independent	5	Independent	3

== Summary ==
Labour increased their majority on the council at the election. The Conservatives lost three seats, including that of their group leader, David Fletcher.

=== Election result ===
2024 Sandwell Metropolitan Borough Council election
Party	This election			Full council			This election		
Party	Seats	Net	Seats %	Other	Total	Total %	Votes	Votes %	+/−
Labour	22	▲5	91.7	42	64	88.9	36,990	56.9	–0.9
Conservative	1	▼3	4.2	4	5	6.9	13,815	21.3	–7.2
Independent	1	▼2	4.2	2	3	4.2	2,949	4.5	+1.9
Reform	0	Steady	0.0	0	0	0.0	4,885	7.5	+5.8
Green	0	Steady	0.0	0	0	0.0	3,578	5.5	+0.9
Liberal Democrats	0	Steady	0.0	0	0	0.0	2,237	3.4	–0.9
TUSC	0	Steady	0.0	0	0	0.0	454	0.7	+0.2
UKIP	0	Steady	0.0	0	0	0.0	71	0.1	N/A
Yeshua	0	Steady	0.0	0	0	0.0	21	<0.1	±0.0

== Ward results ==
=== Abbey ===
Abbey
Party	Candidate	Votes	%	±%
Labour	Nicky Hinchcliff*	2,078	69.0	+2.8
Green	Roderick Macrorie	413	13.7	–1.2
Conservative	Thomas Blewitt	395	13.1	+1.8
TUSC	Justin Macintosh	126	4.2	+0.9
Majority		1,665	55.3	+4.0
Turnout		3,058	36.3	+8.0
Registered electors		8,431		
Labour hold		Swing	▲2.0	

=== Blackheath ===
Blackheath
Party	Candidate	Votes	%	±%
Labour	Kerrie Carmichael*	1,180	52.0	+4.2
Conservative	Bob Dunn	520	22.9	–15.7
Reform	Mike Cooper	310	13.7	N/A
Green	Aldo Mussi	157	6.9	–0.6
Independent	Craig Taylor	102	4.5	N/A
Majority		660	29.1	+19.9
Turnout		2,288	24.9	+5.2
Registered electors		9,183		
Labour hold		Swing	▲10.0	

=== Bristnall ===
Bristnall
Party	Candidate	Votes	%	±%
Labour	Ellen Fenton*	1,413	58.5	+8.4
Conservative	Gemma Barnfield	464	19.2	–7.9
Reform	Chris Clemson	316	13.1	+7.5
Liberal Democrats	Clive Heywood	224	9.3	–1.0
Majority		949	39.3	+16.3
Turnout		2,461	27.5	+4.9
Registered electors		8,941		
Labour hold		Swing	▲8.2	

=== Charlemont with Grove Vale ===
Charlemont with Grove Vale
Party	Candidate	Votes	%	±%
Labour	Dalel Bhamra	1,480	45.6	+6.0
Conservative	David Fisher*	1,243	38.3	–10.3
Reform	Graham Nock	256	7.9	+4.0
Green	Jeremy Parker	135	4.2	N/A
UKIP	Sam Harding	71	2.2	N/A
Liberal Democrats	Usha Braich	59	1.8	–3.7
Majority		237	7.3	N/A
Turnout		3,284	35.2	+6.5
Registered electors		9,331		
Labour gain from Conservative		Swing	▲8.2	

=== Cradley Heath and Old Hill ===
Cradley Heath and Old Hill
Party	Candidate	Votes	%	±%
Labour	Vicki Smith*	1,340	54.3	–3.8
Conservative	Leon Barnfield	506	20.5	–3.5
Reform	Ballie Singh	267	10.8	N/A
Green	Paul Connor	211	8.6	+0.4
Liberal Democrats	Nicholas Bradley	123	5.0	–3.9
TUSC	Cammilla Mngaza	19	0.8	N/A
Majority		834	33.8	–0.3
Turnout		2,495	23.7	+4.2
Registered electors		10,517		
Labour hold		Swing	▼0.2	

=== Friar Park ===
Friar Park
Party	Candidate	Votes	%	±%
Labour	Elizabeth Giles	1,013	51.7	–3.5
Conservative	Scott Chapman*	626	32.0	–2.8
Reform	Steve Khuttan	204	10.4	+5.7
Green	Kevin Priest	50	2.6	–0.6
Liberal Democrats	Richard McVittie	44	2.2	N/A
Yeshua	Colin Rankine	21	1.1	–0.5
Majority		387	19.7	–0.8
Turnout		1,970	22.5	+5.2
Registered electors		8,756		
Labour gain from Conservative		Swing	▼0.4	

=== Great Barr with Yew Tree ===
Great Barr with Yew Tree
Party	Candidate	Votes	%	±%
Labour	Connor Horton	1,507	49.7	–0.9
Conservative	Adrian Jones	752	24.8	–7.6
Reform	Margaret Sutton	292	9.6	+4.9
Liberal Democrats	Mark Smith	262	8.6	–3.3
Green	Shareen Khan	219	7.2	N/A
Majority		755	24.9	+6.7
Turnout		3,064	31.6	+5.5
Registered electors		9,702		
Labour gain from Conservative		Swing	▲3.4	

=== Great Bridge ===
Great Bridge
Party	Candidate	Votes	%	±%
Conservative	Will Gill*	1,278	46.7	+2.2
Labour	Khurshid Haque	1,035	37.8	–12.7
Reform	Pete Durnell	253	9.2	N/A
Green	Awais Qaisar	173	6.3	+1.9
Majority		243	8.9	N/A
Turnout		2,761	28.3	+6.9
Registered electors		9,762		
Conservative hold		Swing	▲7.5	

=== Greets Green and Lyng ===
Greets Green and Lyng
Party	Candidate	Votes	%	±%
Labour Co-op	Pam Randhawa*	1,926	67.2	–6.4
Conservative	Paul Green	422	14.7	–5.2
Green	Gill Darby	295	10.3	+4.3
Reform	Ray Nock	225	7.8	N/A
Majority		1,504	52.5	–1.2
Turnout		2,960	30.8	+9.0
Registered electors		9,604		
Labour Co-op hold		Swing	▼0.6	

=== Hateley Heath ===
Hateley Heath
Party	Candidate	Votes	%	±%
Labour Co-op	Amardeep Singh	1,713	66.9	–3.5
Conservative	Jason Glover	439	17.1	–4.5
Reform	Jackie Nock	283	11.1	+3.5
Liberal Democrats	Martin Roebuck	125	4.9	N/A
Majority		1,274	49.8	+1.0
Turnout		2,604	25.0	+5.2
Registered electors		10,400		
Labour Co-op hold		Swing	▲0.5	

=== Langley ===
Langley
Party	Candidate	Votes	%	±%
Labour	Caroline Owen*	1,523	65.9	+7.2
Conservative	Gillian Coleyshaw	475	20.6	–12.4
Reform	Ian Plant	312	13.5	N/A
Majority		1,048	45.3	+19.5
Turnout		2,354	24.7	+4.6
Registered electors		9,529		
Labour hold		Swing	▲9.8	

=== Newton ===
Newton
Party	Candidate	Votes	%	±%
Labour	Elaine Giles	1,502	57.7	+10.6
Conservative	Ravi Sangar	552	21.2	–11.2
Reform	Geoffrey Sutton	216	8.3	N/A
Green	Hannah Valenzuela	181	6.9	–6.3
Liberal Democrats	Tony Braich	154	5.9	–1.0
Majority		950	36.5	+21.8
Turnout		2,644	30.6	+6.0
Registered electors		8,647		
Labour hold		Swing	▲10.9	

=== Old Warley ===
Old Warley
Party	Candidate	Votes	%	±%
Labour	Luke Cotterill	1,412	51.4	+9.6
Conservative	Jeffrey Regha	619	22.6	–14.4
Reform	Karl Leech	290	10.6	+7.7
Green	Hilary Grandey	249	9.1	N/A
Liberal Democrats	Bob Smith	175	6.4	–11.4
Majority		793	28.8	+24.0
Turnout		2,766	30.4	+0.9
Registered electors		9,099		
Labour gain from Conservative		Swing	▲12.0	

=== Oldbury ===
Oldbury
Party	Candidate	Votes	%	±%
Labour Co-op	Rizwan Jalil*	1,714	58.5	+1.0
Conservative	Robert Yardley	521	17.8	–17.4
Liberal Democrats	Wikas Khan	399	13.6	N/A
Green	Mark Holdroyd	200	6.8	+2.8
TUSC	Richard Gingell	95	3.2	+0.2
Majority		1,193	40.7	+18.4
Turnout		2,995	28.8	+3.1
Registered electors		10,414		
Labour hold		Swing	▲9.2	

=== Princes End ===
Princes End
Party	Candidate	Votes	%	±%
Labour	Archer Williams*	942	46.7	+2.9
Conservative	Kelly Cranston	755	37.4	–10.4
Reform	Gary Dale	268	13.3	+7.9
Green	Joe Loudon	53	2.6	–0.5
Majority		187	13.3	N/A
Turnout		2,038	22.0	+3.0
Registered electors		9,255		
Labour hold		Swing	▲6.7	

=== Rowley ===
Rowley
Party	Candidate	Votes	%	±%
Labour	Sohail Iqbal	1,080	46.9	–2.2
Conservative	Satpal Singh	471	20.4	–12.4
Reform	Chris Fanthom	351	15.2	N/A
Independent	Laured Kalari*	265	11.5	N/A
Green	Saskia Ebanks	138	6.0	+1.3
Majority		609	26.5	+10.2
Turnout		2,327	23.8	+3.9
Registered electors		9,759		
Labour gain from Conservative		Swing	▲5.1	

=== Smethwick ===
Smethwick
Party	Candidate	Votes	%	±%
Labour	Parbinder Kaur*	2,024	68.2	–7.9
Conservative	Stephen Emms	443	14.9	+0.6
Green	Gita Joshi	340	11.5	+2.8
TUSC	Ravaldeep Bath	159	5.4	N/A
Majority		1,581	53.3	–8.5
Turnout		3,043	31.1	+9.7
Registered electors		9,797		
Labour hold		Swing	▼4.3	

=== Soho and Victoria ===
Soho and Victoria
Party	Candidate	Votes	%	±%
Labour	Farut Shaeen	2,207	70.1	–9.9
Green	Jeremy Rendell	435	13.8	+5.3
Conservative	Parminder Dhesi	336	10.7	–0.2
Liberal Democrats	Keith Wilmot	169	5.4	N/A
Majority		1,772	56.3	–12.8
Turnout		3,234	29.2	+7.3
Registered electors		11,066		
Labour hold		Swing	▼7.6	

=== St. Paul's ===
St. Paul's
Party	Candidate	Votes	%	±%
Labour	Sukhbir Singh Gill*	2,928	84.0	+5.9
Conservative	Patricia Emms	557	16.0	+1.4
Majority		2,371	68.0	+4.6
Turnout		3,774	35.2	+8.1
Registered electors		10,712		
Labour hold		Swing	▲2.3	

=== Tipton Green ===
Tipton Green
Party	Candidate	Votes	%	±%
Independent	Richard Jeffcoat	1,630	51.2	+9.0
Labour	Charn Padda*	1,226	38.5	–12.3
Conservative	Aaron Emms	328	10.3	+3.5
Majority		404	12.7	N/A
Turnout		3,233	30.6	+3.4
Registered electors		10,559		
Independent gain from Labour		Swing	▲10.7	

=== Tividale ===
Tividale
Party	Candidate	Votes	%	±%
Labour	Maria Crompton*	1,295	59.2	+9.9
Conservative	Neil Griffiths	502	23.0	–18.0
Reform	Steve Dabbs	264	12.1	N/A
Liberal Democrats	Palwinder Singh	125	5.7	N/A
Majority		793	36.2	+27.9
Turnout		2,207	24.0	+3.6
Registered electors		9,183		
Labour hold		Swing	▲14.0	

=== Wednesbury North ===
Wednesbury North
Party	Candidate	Votes	%	±%
Labour Co-op	Peter Hughes	1,042	41.6	–15.0
Conservative	Steve Simcox	517	20.7	–9.9
Independent	Abdul Husen	513	20.5	N/A
Reform	Jayne Heathcote	259	10.4	+5.8
Green	Mark Redding	106	4.2	–2.5
Liberal Democrats	Richard Jones	49	2.0	N/A
TUSC	Gareth Knox	16	0.6	–0.7
Majority		525	20.9	–5.1
Turnout		2,531	27.4	+6.8
Registered electors		9,236		
Labour hold		Swing	▼2.6	

=== Wednesbury South ===
Wednesbury South
Party	Candidate	Votes	%	±%
Labour	Jenny Chidley	1,603	59.8	+1.2
Conservative	Connor Marshall	636	23.7	–9.4
Reform	Jack Sabharwal	258	9.6	+6.7
Liberal Democrats	Manjit Lall	143	5.3	+1.2
TUSC	U'Sema Makaya	39	1.5	+0.5
Majority		967	36.1	+10.5
Turnout		2,717	26.3	+3.5
Registered electors		10,319		
Labour hold		Swing	▲5.3	

=== West Bromwich Central ===
West Bromwich Central
Party	Candidate	Votes	%	±%
Labour	Farzana Haq	1,807	53.6	–17.4
Conservative	Rafiullah Mohammadzai	458	13.6	–11.4
Independent	Mohammed Rohim	439	13.0	N/A
Reform	Robert White	261	7.7	N/A
Green	Sarah Deans	223	6.6	±0.0
Liberal Democrats	Daljit Kaur Nagra	186	5.5	+1.0
Majority		1,349	40.0	–6.0
Turnout		3,453	33.1	+8.4
Registered electors		10,434		
Labour hold		Swing	▼3.0	
