= 2004 Sandwell Metropolitan Borough Council election =

2004 UK local government election

Map of the results of the 2004 Sandwell council election. Labour in red, Conservatives in blue, Liberal Democrats in yellow and British National Party in dark blue.

The 2004 Sandwell Metropolitan Borough Council election took place on 10 June 2004 to elect members of Sandwell Metropolitan Borough Council in the West Midlands, England. The whole council was up for election with boundary changes since the last election in 2003. The Labour Party stayed in overall control of the council.

== Campaign ==
Before the election the council was controlled by Labour with 55 seats, compared to 9 for the Conservatives, 6 Liberal Democrats and 2 British National Party.

During the campaign the Chancellor of the Exchequer Gordon Brown visited Sandwell and called on voters to reject the British National Party.

== Election results ==
The results saw Labour easily hold on to control of the council after dropping just 3 seats. The leader of the council, Bill Thomas, described the results as "remarkable" considering it was a mid term election and called it a "vote of confidence". However Labour did lose seats to the Conservatives, including 2 in St Paul's ward, meaning that the Conservatives made a gain of 4 seats. The Liberal Democrats stayed on 6 seats, while the British National Party dropped to just 1 seat. The only successful BNP candidate was in Princes End ward, where James Lloyd was elected, while in the same ward his party colleague John Salvage lost his seat on the council.

Sandwell local election result 2004
Party	Seats	Gains	Losses	Net gain/loss	Seats %	Votes %	Votes	+/−
Labour	52			-3	72.2	50.7	97,638	+3.7
Conservative	13			+4	18.1	28.1	54,028	-0.5
Liberal Democrats	6			0	8.3	13.3	25,631	+2.7
BNP	1			-1	1.4	4.0	7,750	-1.9
Freedom Party	0			0	0.0	1.5	2,872	-0.6
Socialist Labour	0			0	0.0	1.0	1,934	-3.2
2003 Community Party	0			0	0.0	0.9	1,759	-0.3
UKIP	0			0	0.0	0.3	588	+0.2
Independent	0			0	0.0	0.1	207	+0.1

== Ward results ==
Abbey (3)
Party	Candidate	Votes	%	±%
Labour	Ann Jaron	2,007		
Labour	Steven Eling	1,941		
Labour	Robert Piper	1,850		
Liberal Democrats	Roger Prior	840		
Conservative	Ewart Johnson	801		
Conservative	Roger Hickman	793		
Conservative	William Shipman	706		
Turnout		8,938		

Blackheath (3)
Party	Candidate	Votes	%	±%
Conservative	Mary Docker	1,369		
Labour	Robert Price	1,368		
Labour	Glenn Harris	1,346		
Labour	David Walker	1,310		
Conservative	Debbie Elwell	1,237		
Conservative	Shirley Ching	1,155		
Turnout		7,785		

Bristnall (3)
Party	Candidate	Votes	%	±%
Labour	Malcolm Bridges	1,313		
Labour	Lois Griffin	1,247		
Conservative	Terence Grainger	1,235		
Labour	Vicky Handy	1,073		
Conservative	John Irons-Patterson	1,062		
Conservative	Leslie Pawlowski	940		
Socialist Labour	Sukhjinder Clair	256		
Turnout		7,126		

Charlemont with Grove Vale (3)
Party	Candidate	Votes	%	±%
Conservative	Alan Burkit	1,646		
Conservative	Anne Hughes	1,521		
Conservative	Tony Ward	1,463		
Liberal Democrats	Keith Allcock	985		
Labour	Mark Handy	923		
Liberal Democrats	Diane Gorton	837		
Labour	Jean Heywood	808		
Labour	Bob Patel	714		
Liberal Democrats	Bhajan Rai	696		
Turnout		9,593		

Cradley Heath and Old Hill (3)
Party	Candidate	Votes	%	±%
Labour	Margaret James	1,549		
Labour	Ann Shackleton	1,397		
Labour	Glenis Webb	1,277		
Conservative	Liz Bowler	1,115		
Conservative	Ronald Griffiths	918		
BNP	Stuart Deeley	850		
Conservative	Michael Hardy	840		
Turnout		7,946		

Friar Park (3)
Party	Candidate	Votes	%	±%
Labour	Geoffrey Lewis	1,463		
Labour	Joyce Edis	1,190		
Labour	Simon Hackett	1,179		
Conservative	Raymond Webb	880		
Conservative	Barry Nelson	820		
Liberal Democrats	Dorothy Brayshaw	651		
Turnout		6,183		

Great Barr with Yew Tree (3)
Party	Candidate	Votes	%	±%
Liberal Democrats	Sadie Smith	1,612		
Liberal Democrats	Margaret Macklin	1,221		
Liberal Democrats	Mary Wilson	1,009		
Conservative	Robert Lawrence	886		
Labour	Harbinder Deol	850		
Labour	Janet Bott-Obi	811		
BNP	Derrick Dale	798		
Labour	Michael Shackleton	767		
BNP	Scott Dale	757		
Turnout		8,711		

Great Bridge (3)
Party	Candidate	Votes	%	±%
Labour	Derek Rowley	1,115		
Labour	Peter Allen	1,081		
Labour	Maureen Whitehouse	983		
BNP	Arthur Copson	880		
2003 Community Party	Fred Perry	770		
BNP	Simon Smith	767		
2003 Community Party	Robert Roper	506		
2003 Community Party	Malcolm Beckley	483		
Conservative	Philip Mansell	366		
Liberal Democrats	Philip Roberts	213		
Conservative	Onkar Badial	212		
Independent	Naranjan Khag	207		
Conservative	Avtar Sandhu	190		
Turnout		7,773		

Greets Green and Lyng (3)
Party	Candidate	Votes	%	±%
Labour	John Edwards	1,360		
Labour	Gurchuran Sidhu	1,345		
Labour	Robert Badham	1,284		
Liberal Democrats	Dorothy Jones	768		
Liberal Democrats	Mazar Hussain	732		
Liberal Democrats	Darren Saxon	707		
Conservative	Rosemarie Campbell	664		
Conservative	Mohammed Ahmed	616		
Turnout		7,476		

Hateley Heath (3)
Party	Candidate	Votes	%	±%
Labour	Joanna Watson	1,480		
Labour	John Blyth	1,443		
Labour	Terry Williams	1,404		
Liberal Democrats	Reg Hackett	744		
Conservative	Kathleen Ryan	614		
Conservative	Gaynor Skeldon	582		
Liberal Democrats	Jarnail Sandhu	494		
Liberal Democrats	Shaju Islam	437		
Turnout		7,198		

Langley (3)
Party	Candidate	Votes	%	±%
Labour	Pauline Hinton	1,493		
Labour	Martin Prestidge	1,485		
Labour	Michael Davies	1,381		
Conservative	Robert Unitt	994		
Conservative	Arthur Worley	898		
Turnout		6,251		

Newton (3)
Party	Candidate	Votes	%	±%
Liberal Democrats	Joyce Underhill	1,928		
Liberal Democrats	Martyn Smith	1,795		
Liberal Democrats	Anthony Underhill	1,761		
Labour	David Hosell	992		
Labour	Delia Edwards	882		
Labour	Ravi Kumar	785		
Conservative	Valerie Ward	693		
Turnout		8,836		

Oldbury (3)
Party	Candidate	Votes	%	±%
Labour	Babu Bawa	1,823		
Labour	Elaine Giles	1,686		
Labour	Mahboob Hussain	1,612		
Conservative	David Hadley	1,233		
Conservative	Abdul Qayyum	959		
Conservative	Harbhajan Mann	859		
Liberal Democrats	Tofayal Ahmed	371		
Turnout		8,543		

Old Warley (3)
Party	Candidate	Votes	%	±%
Conservative	Karen Bissell	1,822		
Conservative	Nicholas Meacham	1,669		
Conservative	John McHard	1,667		
Labour	Trevor Crompton	1,439		
Labour	Gordon McKenzie	1,372		
Labour	Janice Whitehead	1,326		
Turnout		9,295		

Princes End (3)
Party	Candidate	Votes	%	±%
BNP	James Lloyd	987		
Labour	Raymond Howes	947		
Labour	June Newell	939		
BNP	John Savage	886		
Labour	Andrew Millard	866		
UKIP	Kevin Walker	588		
Conservative	Mark Nelson	423		
Turnout		5,636		

Rowley (3)
Party	Candidate	Votes	%	±%
Labour	Iris Boucher	1,667		
Labour	Barbara Price	1,638		
Labour	William Thomas	1,613		
Conservative	Joanne Hadley	1,075		
Conservative	Jonathan Millward	1,040		
Conservative	Donald O'Connor	1,011		
Turnout		8,044		

St Paul's (3)
Party	Candidate	Votes	%	±%
Conservative	Mohammed Sakhi	1,873		
Conservative	Mohammed Zaheer	1,861		
Labour	Gurinder Josan	1,855		
Labour	Bawa Dhallu	1,760		
Labour	Jagwant Gill	1,746		
Liberal Democrats	Sahbud Ullah	1,621		
Conservative	Manjit Lall	682		
Socialist Labour	Ranjit Tagger	462		
Turnout		11,860		

Smethwick (3)
Party	Candidate	Votes	%	±%
Labour	Linda Horton	1,707		
Labour	Keith Davies	1,602		
Labour	Victor Silvester	1,363		
Conservative	Beryl Hickman	892		
Socialist Labour	Balkar Sandhu	495		
Liberal Democrats	Mohammed Majied	423		
Turnout		6,482		

Soho and Victoria (3)
Party	Candidate	Votes	%	±%
Labour	Darren Cooper	1,852		
Labour	Roger Horton	1,736		
Labour	Mohammad Rouf	1,679		
Liberal Democrats	Shamin Ahmed	888		
Liberal Democrats	Wasim Abbas	829		
Liberal Democrats	Christopher Reed	703		
Conservative	Salahadin Adrwish	354		
Conservative	David Dixon	353		
Socialist Labour	Malcolm Connigale	213		
Turnout		8,607		

Tipton Green (3)
Party	Candidate	Votes	%	±%
Labour	Ian Jones	1,591		
Labour	Syeda Khatun	1,506		
Labour	Stephen Edwards	1,460		
Freedom Party	Stephen Edwards	1,178		
Freedom Party	Alison Aitken-Jones	859		
Freedom Party	William Aitken-Jones	835		
Conservative	Basharat Khan	686		
Conservative	Lorraine Nelson	657		
BNP	Terence Taylor	651		
Conservative	Montaj Ali	541		
Liberal Democrats	Yvonne Reed	305		
Liberal Democrats	Ansar Hussain	258		
Turnout		10,527		

Tividale (3)
Party	Candidate	Votes	%	±%
Labour	Maria Crompton	1,735		
Labour	David Hinton	1,539		
Labour	Douglas Parish	1,438		
BNP	Carl Butler	1,174		
Turnout		5,886		

Wednesbury North (3)
Party	Candidate	Votes	%	±%
Conservative	William Archer	1,954		
Conservative	Elaine Costigan	1,739		
Conservative	Mavis Hughes	1,537		
Labour	Roy Melia	739		
Labour	Lorraine Ashman	643		
Labour	Gulshan Chowdhury	592		
Turnout		7,204		

Wednesbury South (3)
Party	Candidate	Votes	%	±%
Labour	Robert Evans	1,522		
Labour	George Turton	1,327		
Labour	Susan Downing	1,301		
Conservative	Alan Nugent	1,096		
Conservative	Jean Nugent	1,015		
Conservative	Atma Matharu	841		
Liberal Democrats	Richard Mitchener	493		
Turnout		7,595		

West Bromwich Central (3)
Party	Candidate	Votes	%	±%
Labour	Linda Turton	1,796		
Labour	Tarsem King	1,766		
Labour	Mohinder Tagger	1,559		
Conservative	Norman Lawley	973		
Liberal Democrats	Sandra Beriford	870		
Liberal Democrats	Bertram Richards	787		
Liberal Democrats	Mohammed Ashgar	653		
Socialist Labour	Ranjit Powar	508		
Turnout		8,912		
