= 2012 Sandwell Metropolitan Borough Council election =

2012 UK local government election

← 2011	3 May 2012	2014 →

One third (24) seats to Sandwell Borough Council
	First party	Second party	Third party
Party	Labour	Conservative	Liberal Democrats
Seats won	24	0	0
Seat change	▲10	▼3	▼2
- Map of the results
Council control before election
Labour
Council control after election
Labour

The 2012 Sandwell Metropolitan Borough Council election took place on 3 May 2012 to elect members of Sandwell Metropolitan Borough Council in the West Midlands, England. This was on the same day as other 2012 United Kingdom local elections. In the ward of Great Bridge, the Conservative Party was criticised for fielding a candidate who had the same name as the Labour Party councillor.

Due to being elected 'in thirds', councillors elected at the 2008 Sandwell Council election were defending their seats in 2012.

The Labour Party won every seat, increasing their majority.

== Election results ==
Sandwell Metropolitan Borough Election, 2012
Party	Seats	Gains	Losses	Net gain/loss	Seats %	Votes %	Votes	+/−
Labour	24	▲10	Steady	▲10	100.0			
Conservative	0	Steady	▼8	▼8	0.0			
Liberal Democrats	0	Steady	▼2	▼2	0.0			
Green	0	Steady	Steady	Steady	0.0			
Independent	0	Steady	Steady	Steady	0.0			
BNP	0	Steady	Steady	Steady	0.0			
National Front	0	Steady	Steady	Steady	0.0			
TOTAL	24					100.0		

== Ward results ==
Abbey Ward
Party	Candidate	Votes	%	±%
Labour	Ann Jaron	2,017	75.4	▲6.9
Conservative	Chris Brown	319	11.9	▼6.1
Green	Barry Lim	239	8.9	▼0.3
Liberal Democrats	Matthew Gibson	99	3.7	▼0.6
Majority				
Turnout				
Labour hold		Swing		

Blackheath Ward
Party	Candidate	Votes	%	±%
Labour	Kerrie Carmichael	1,324	53.2	▼5.4
Conservative	Mary Docker	860	34.6	▼6.8
Sandwell Traditional Independent	Shirley Ching	305	12.3	▲12.3
Majority				
Turnout				
Labour gain from Conservative		Swing		

Bristnall Ward
Party	Candidate	Votes	%	±%
Labour	Ann Jarvis	1,489	72.2	▲5.7
Conservative	Terry Grainger	573	27.8	▼5.7
Majority				
Turnout				
Labour gain from Conservative		Swing		

Charlemont with Grove Vale Ward
Party	Candidate	Votes	%	±%
Labour	Liam Preece	1,202	47.1	▲5.4
Conservative	Ray Nock	849	33.3	▼11.6
Sandwell Traditional Independent	Hilary Taylor	255	10.0	▲10.0
Green	Dell Macefield	151	5.9	▼1.0
Liberal Democrats	Richard Mitchener	96	3.8	▼2.9
Majority				
Turnout				
Labour gain from Conservative		Swing		

Cradley Heath and Old Hill Ward
Party	Candidate	Votes	%	±%
Labour Co-op	John Tipper	1,465	59.1	▼3.2
Conservative	Liz Bowler	673	27.13	▼5.1
BNP	John Salvage	213	8.6	▲8.6
Liberal Democrats	Robert Johns	130	5.24	▼0.4
Majority				
Turnout				
Labour Co-op gain from Conservative		Swing		

Friar Park Ward
Party	Candidate	Votes	%	±%
Labour	Geoff Lewis	1,421	82.0	▲17.2
Conservative	Paul Farrington	312	18.0	▼10.0
Majority				
Turnout				
Labour hold		Swing		

Great Barr with Yew Tree Ward
Party	Candidate	Votes	%	±%
Labour	Christopher Worsey	1,549	53.8	▲5.7
Liberal Democrats	Sadie Smith	866	30.1	▲5.2
Conservative	Mark Cowles	464	16.1	▼0.4
Majority				
Turnout				
Labour gain from Liberal Democrats		Swing		

Great Bridge Ward
Party	Candidate	Votes	%	±%
Labour	Derek Rowley	1,561	81.5	▲7.7
Conservative	Derek Joseph Rowley	354	18.5	▼7.7
Majority				
Turnout				
Labour hold		Swing		

Greets Green and Lyng Ward
Party	Candidate	Votes	%	±%
Labour	John Edwards	1,790	85.9	▲12.8
Conservative	Bob Fitzpatrick	293	14.1	▼5.5
Majority				
Turnout				
Labour hold		Swing		

Hateley Heath Ward
Party	Candidate	Votes	%	±%
Labour	Paul Sandars	1,632	75.2	▲8.5
Conservative	Steve Dabbs	287	13.2	▼15.8
BNP	Terry Lewin	163	7.5	▲7.5
Green	Colin Bye	89	4.1	▲4.1
Majority				
Turnout				
Labour hold		Swing		

Langley Ward
Party	Candidate	Votes	%	±%
Labour	Sharon Davies	1,636	75.5	▲7.7
Conservative	Dennis Bishop	425	19.6	▼12.6
Liberal Democrats	William Murcott	106	4.9	▲4.9
Majority				
Turnout				
Labour hold		Swing		

Newton Ward
Party	Candidate	Votes	%	±%
Labour	Joyce Underhill	1,483	59.0	▲9.4
Liberal Democrats	David Fisher	519	20.7	▼8.5
Conservative	Sandra Vickers	279	11.1	▼7.8
Sandwell Traditional Independent	Bert Richards	128	5.1	▲2.6
Independent	Margaret Macklin	104	4.1	▲4.1
Majority				
Turnout				
Labour gain from Liberal Democrats		Swing		

Old Warley Ward
Party	Candidate	Votes	%	±%
Labour	Susan Crumpton	1,601	59.6	▲4.7
Conservative	Lee Pawlowski	706	26.3	▼3.6
Sandwell Traditional Independent	John McHard	148	5.5	▲0.1
Green	Aldo Mussi	132	4.9	▼0.1
Liberal Democrats	Bryan Manley-Green	99	3.7	▼1.2
Majority				
Turnout				
Labour gain from Conservative		Swing		

Oldbury Ward
Party	Candidate	Votes	%	±%
Labour	Susan Downing	2,163	85.0	▲3.5
Conservative	Ben Elwell	381	15.0	▼3.5
Majority				
Turnout				
Labour hold		Swing		

Princes End Ward
Party	Candidate	Votes	%	±%
Labour	Bill Cherrington	1,175	69.0	▲13.7
Conservative	Beatrice Owen	528	31.0	▲0.2
Majority				
Turnout				
Labour gain from Conservative		Swing		

Rowley Ward
Party	Candidate	Votes	%	±%
Labour	Susan Eaves	1,592	75.8	▲13.5
Conservative	Mary Pawlowski	508	24.2	▼13.5
Majority				
Turnout				
Labour hold		Swing		

Smethwick Ward
Party	Candidate	Votes	%	±%
Labour	Linda Horton	2,088	83.2	▲12.5
Conservative	Nagi Daya Singh	298	11.9	▼7.5
Liberal Democrats	Manjit Lall	125	5.0	▲5.0
Majority				
Turnout				
Labour hold		Swing		

Soho and Victoria Ward
Party	Candidate	Votes	%	±%
Labour	Darren Cooper	2,791	95.2	▲4.4
Conservative	Ewart Johnson	142	4.8	▼4.4
Majority				
Turnout				
Labour hold		Swing		

St Paul's Ward
Party	Candidate	Votes	%	±%
Labour	Preet Gill	2,506	72.4	▼9.5
Independent	Harbhajan Singh Dardi	502	14.5	▲14.5
Sandwell Traditional Independent	Bob Dunn	277	8.0	▲8.0
Conservative	Maurice Gaunt	176	5.1	▼13.0
Majority				
Turnout				
Labour hold		Swing		

Tipton Green Ward
Party	Candidate	Votes	%	±%
Labour	Ian Jones	1,643	72.4	▲8.0
Conservative	Nathan Poole	365	16.1	▼7.4
National Front	Ade Woodhouse	261	11.5	▼0.6
Majority				
Turnout				
Labour hold		Swing		

Tividale Ward
Party	Candidate	Votes	%	±%
Labour	Maria Crompton	1,637	80.8	▲16.1
Conservative	Jack Sabharwal	390	19.2	▼9.6
Majority				
Turnout				
Labour hold		Swing		

Wednesbury North Ward
Party	Candidate	Votes	%	±%
Labour	Peter Hughes	1,589	73.1	▲5.6
Conservative	Marc Lucock	584	26.9	▼2.5
Majority				
Turnout				
Labour gain from Conservative		Swing		

Wednesbury South Ward
Party	Candidate	Votes	%	±%
Labour	Pam Hughes	1,752		
Conservative	Ian Hunt	590		
Majority				
Turnout				
Labour gain from Conservative		Swing		

West Bromwich Central Ward
Party	Candidate	Votes	%	±%
Labour	Kim Frazer	2,003		
Conservative	Robert White	358		
Green	David Hawkins	256		
Majority				
Turnout				
Labour hold		Swing		
