= 2010 Sandwell Metropolitan Borough Council election =

2010 UK local government election

Map of the results of the 2010 Sandwell council election. Labour in red, Conservatives in blue and Liberal Democrats in yellow.

The 2010 Sandwell Metropolitan Borough Council election took place on 6 May 2010 to elect members of Sandwell Metropolitan Borough Council in the West Midlands, England. One third of the council was up for election and the Labour Party stayed in overall control of the council.

After the election, the composition of the council was:

- Labour 56
- Conservative 12
- Liberal Democrat 4

== Background ==
24 seats were contested in the election with the British National Party contesting every seat for the first time, more than the Liberal Democrats who only stood in 13 seats. Labour were defending over half of the seats being contested, with the deputy leader of the council, Mahboob Hussain in Oldbury ward, being among the councillors standing for re-election.

== Election result ==
The results saw Labour increase their majority on the council after gaining 7 seats. Labour took 2 seats from the Conservatives, 1 from the Liberal Democrats, 2 from the British National Party and 2 from independents. This meant Labour had 56 seats, compared to 12 for the Conservatives and 4 for the Liberal Democrats. Meanwhile, the British National Party losses in Princes End and Tividale meant the party no longer had any seats on the council.

Sandwell local election result 2010
Party	Seats	Gains	Losses	Net gain/loss	Seats %	Votes %	Votes	+/−
Labour	21	7	0	+7	87.5	47.4	61,128	+3.6%
Conservative	2	0	2	-2	8.3	27.9	35,924	-8.2%
Liberal Democrats	1	0	1	-1	4.2	10.5	13,589	+0.7%
BNP	0	0	2	-2	0	11.5	14,860	+3.1%
Independent	0	0	2	-2	0	1.4	1,846	+1.3%
Green	0	0	0	0	0	1.1	1,402	-0.4%
CPA	0	0	0	0	0	0.1	154	+0.1%

== Ward results ==
Abbey
Party	Candidate	Votes	%	±%
Labour	Bob Piper	3,352	57.6	+5.9
Conservative	Chris Brown	1,418	24.3	−5.9
Green	Barry Lim	652	11.2	+4.3
BNP	Kim Nunn	402	6.9	+6.9
Majority		1,934	33.2	+10.6
Turnout		5,824	66.7	
Labour hold		Swing		

Blackheath
Party	Candidate	Votes	%	±%
Labour	Malcolm Bridges	2,272	41.3	+4.6
Conservative	Shirley Ching	1,942	35.3	−18.7
Liberal Democrats	Siobhan Wilson	726	13.2	+3.9
BNP	Michaela Meachem	555	10.1	+10.1
Majority		330	6.0	
Turnout		5,495	59.4	
Labour gain from Conservative		Swing		

Bristnall
Party	Candidate	Votes	%	±%
Labour	Steven Frear	2,495	46.1	+2.0
Conservative	Clive Brunt	1,558	28.8	−17.9
Liberal Democrats	Bryan Manley-Green	781	14.4	+5.2
BNP	Charles Cooper	575	10.6	+10.6
Majority		937	17.3	
Turnout		5,409	58.6	
Labour hold		Swing		

Charlemont with Grove Vale
Party	Candidate	Votes	%	±%
Conservative	Tony Ward	2,511	40.8	−7.5
Labour	Liam Preece	1,947	31.7	+12.1
Liberal Democrats	Michaela Allcock	957	15.6	+4.9
BNP	Deborah Howe	596	9.7	−7.2
Green	Dell Macefield	139	2.3	−2.3
Majority		564	9.2	−19.5
Turnout		6,150	65.8	
Conservative hold		Swing		

Cradley Heath and Old Hill
Party	Candidate	Votes	%	±%
Labour	Julie Webb	2,596	44.3	−1.8
Conservative	Alan Bowler	1,901	32.4	−21.5
Liberal Democrats	Robert Johns	805	13.7	+13.7
BNP	Ann-Marie Hamblett	558	9.5	+9.5
Majority		695	11.9	
Turnout		5,860	58.7	
Labour hold		Swing		

Friar Park
Party	Candidate	Votes	%	±%
Labour	Simon Hackett	2,201	46.3	+1.4
Conservative	Paul Farrington	1,296	27.3	−2.9
BNP	David Sawers	715	15.0	−3.7
Liberal Democrats	Dorothy Brayshaw	541	11.4	+5.3
Majority		905	19.0	+4.3
Turnout		4,753	52.1	
Labour hold		Swing		

Great Barr with Yew Tree
Party	Candidate	Votes	%	±%
Labour	Steve Melia	2,332	37.3	+10.6
Liberal Democrats	Mary Wilson	1,862	29.8	−6.2
Conservative	Robert White	1,420	22.7	+1.6
BNP	Terence Lewin	637	10.2	−6.0
Majority		470	7.5	
Turnout		6,251	64.2	
Labour gain from Liberal Democrats		Swing		

Great Bridge
Party	Candidate	Votes	%	±%
Labour	Joanne Hadley	1,973	40.3	−4.7
Conservative	Steve Simcox	1,076	22.0	−1.2
BNP	Jennifer Howells	816	16.7	−9.5
Independent	Tony Roper	594	12.1	+12.1
Liberal Democrats	Tom Underhill	431	8.8	+3.1
Majority		897	18.3	−0.5
Turnout		4,890		
Labour gain from Independent		Swing		

Greets Green and Lyng
Party	Candidate	Votes	%	±%
Labour	Robert Badham	2,436	56.6	+5.3
Conservative	Elaine Fitzpatrick	889	20.7	−3.4
BNP	John Howells	540	12.6	−4.6
Liberal Democrats	Richard Mitchener	437	10.2	+2.9
Majority		1,547	36.0	+8.8
Turnout		4,302	53.5	
Labour hold		Swing		

Hateley Heath
Party	Candidate	Votes	%	±%
Labour	Paul Moore	2,621	52.1	+6.2
Conservative	Stephanie Page	1,436	28.5	+2.5
BNP	Emma McCandless	822	16.3	−2.6
CPA	Patrick Fahey	154	3.1	+3.1
Majority		1,185	23.5	+3.6
Turnout		5,033	52.1	
Labour gain from Independent		Swing		

Langley
Party	Candidate	Votes	%	±%
Labour	Mick Davies	2,355	45.8	−1.8
Conservative	Michael Cooper	1,522	29.6	−4.0
Liberal Democrats	Ronald Hackett	651	12.7	+7.6
BNP	Tracey Morris	615	12.0	−1.6
Majority		833	16.2	+2.2
Turnout		5,143	56.2	
Labour hold		Swing		

Newton
Party	Candidate	Votes	%	±%
Liberal Democrats	Tony Underhill	2,088	36.0	−9.4
Labour	Shirley Hosell	1,979	34.2	+9.3
Conservative	Val Ward	1,303	22.5	−3.9
BNP	Debbie Johnson	425	7.3	+7.3
Majority		109	1.9	−17.1
Turnout		5,795	64.9	
Liberal Democrats hold		Swing		

Old Warley
Party	Candidate	Votes	%	±%
Labour	Steve Trow	2,370	40.2	+1.4
Conservative	John McHard	1,989	33.8	−11.8
Liberal Democrats	Bob Smith	866	14.7	+3.7
BNP	Peter Whitehouse	488	8.3	+8.3
Green	Aldo Mussi	176	3.0	−1.6
Majority		381	6.4	
Turnout		5,889	64.2	
Labour gain from Conservative		Swing		

Oldbury
Party	Candidate	Votes	%	±%
Labour	Mahboob Hussain	3,673	65.9	+14.9
Conservative	Bisharat Hussain	1,201	21.6	−13.2
BNP	Mark Morris	697	12.5	+12.5
Majority		2,472	44.4	+28.2
Turnout		5,571	59.3	
Labour hold		Swing		

Princes End
Party	Candidate	Votes	%	±%
Labour	Suzanne Hartwell	1,891	42.1	+8.2
Conservative	Keith Vaughan	1,412	31.4	−14.6
BNP	Russ Green	1,189	26.5	+6.3
Majority		479	10.7	
Turnout		4,492	48.1	
Labour gain from BNP		Swing		

Rowley
Party	Candidate	Votes	%	±%
Labour	Chris Tranter	2,540	49.2	+3.7
Conservative	Maurice Gaunt	1,838	35.6	+0.7
BNP	Joseph Skeldon	786	15.2	+0.2
Majority		702	13.6	+3.0
Turnout		5,164	56.6	
Labour hold		Swing		

St. Pauls
Party	Candidate	Votes	%	±%
Labour	Babu Bawa	2,943	52.1	−0.5
Conservative	Jagtar Chaggar	1,234	21.9	−16.9
Independent	Abdul Rehman	887	15.7	+13.5
BNP	Susan Simpson	321	5.7	+5.7
Green	Neil Barlow	259	4.6	+4.6
Majority		1,709	30.3	+16.5
Turnout		5,644	60.3	
Labour hold		Swing		

Smethwick
Party	Candidate	Votes	%	±%
Labour	Vic Silvester	3,388	63.0	+4.0
Conservative	Gurpreet Cheema	1,341	24.9	−2.7
BNP	Lynne Benion	653	12.1	+12.1
Majority		2,047	38.0	+6.6
Turnout		5,382	56.2	
Labour hold		Swing		

Soho and Victoria
Party	Candidate	Votes	%	±%
Labour	Mohammad Rouf	3,462	67.3	−3.6
Liberal Democrats	Mazhar Hussain	835	16.2	+0.3
Conservative	Altaf Ahmed	642	12.5	−0.7
BNP	Tracy Sefton	208	4.0	+4.0
Majority		2,627	51.0	−4.1
Turnout		5,147	56.3	
Labour hold		Swing		

Tipton Green
Party	Candidate	Votes	%	±%
Labour	Ahmadul Haque	2,252	41.3	−6.4
Conservative	Steve Downing	1,608	29.5	+5.7
BNP	Karen Parkes	709	13.0	−5.5
Liberal Democrats	Nigel Richards	525	9.6	−0.4
Independent	Steve Wilkinson	365	6.7	+6.7
Majority		644	11.8	−12.1
Turnout		5,459	56.6	
Labour hold		Swing		

Tividale
Party	Candidate	Votes	%	±%
Labour	Jayne Wilkinson	2,166	40.9	−15.4
Conservative	John Stockall	1,571	29.7	−14.1
Liberal Democrats	Joanne Arnold	793	15.0	+15.0
BNP	Gordon Howells	761	14.4	+14.4
Majority		595	11.2	−1.3
Turnout		5,291	56.7	
Labour gain from BNP		Swing		

Wednesbury North
Party	Candidate	Votes	%	±%
Conservative	Mavis Hughes	1,989	39.2	−40.1
Labour	Pete Hughes	1,938	38.2	+17.5
BNP	Emma Howell	615	12.1	+12.1
Liberal Democrats	Christopher Stanley	534	10.5	+10.5
Majority		51	1.0	−57.5
Turnout		5,076	55.4	
Conservative hold		Swing		

Wednesbury South
Party	Candidate	Votes	%	±%
Labour	Elizabeth Giles	2,758	51.1	+12.7
Conservative	Valerie Bowen	1,841	34.1	−6.7
BNP	Mark Paskin	798	14.8	−0.9
Majority		917	17.0	
Turnout		5,397	56.7	
Labour hold		Swing		

West Bromwich Central
Party	Candidate	Votes	%	±%
Labour	Mohinder Tagger	3,188	58.1	+3.7
Conservative	Jack Sabharwal	986	18.0	−5.7
Liberal Democrats	David Fisher	757	13.8	+7.7
BNP	Terence Stanway	379	6.9	−5.0
Green	David Hawkins	176	3.2	−0.7
Majority		2,202	40.1	+9.3
Turnout		5,486	58.9	
Labour hold		Swing		
