= 2007 Sandwell Metropolitan Borough Council election =

2007 UK local government election

Map of the results of the 2007 Sandwell council election. Labour in red, Conservatives in blue and Liberal Democrats in yellow.

The 2007 Sandwell Metropolitan Borough Council election took place on 3 May 2007 to elect members of Sandwell Metropolitan Borough Council in the West Midlands, England. One third of the council was up for election and the Labour Party stayed in overall control of the council.

After the election, the composition of the council was:

- Labour 51
- Conservative 10
- Liberal Democrat 6
- British National Party 4
- Vacant 1

== Campaign ==
Before the election Labour ran the council with 50 councillors, compared to 12 for the Conservatives, 5 Liberal Democrats, 4 British National Party and 1 independent. Labour defended 19 of the seats being contested, with the other parties hoping to make gains from Labour.

The British National Party put up 15 candidates, aiming to build on the 3 gains they had made in the 2006 election. The party campaigned on immigration, housing and crime and were hoping to take all 3 seats in Princes End ward for the first time anywhere in the United Kingdom. However the British National Party was accused of "distortion and lies" by Labour and the Conservatives described the British National Party's councillors as an "embarrassment".

In the last couple of days before polling day, the council sent an advertising van around the area to remind voters about the election.

== Election results ==
The results saw the Labour Party easily stay in control of the council, with the Labour leader of the council describing the results as "remarkable". Labour gained one seat from the Conservatives in St Pauls ward to move to 51 seats after winning 20 of the seats contested. The Conservatives also lost a seat in Yew Tree to the Liberal Democrats. They meant both the Conservatives and Liberal Democrats won 2 seats each in the election, with the Conservatives dropping to 10 seats and the Liberal Democrats going up to 6.

The British National Party failed to win any seats, staying on 4 councillors, coming closest to victory in Princes End where they were 20 votes behind Labour. A further seat was vacant after independent councillor Alan Burkitt was automatically disqualified after having been given a suspended sentence.

Sandwell local election result 2007
Party	Seats	Gains	Losses	Net gain/loss	Seats %	Votes %	Votes	+/−
Labour	20	1	0	+1	83.3	45.1	34,616	+0.9
Conservative	2	0	2	-2	8.3	27.3	20,947	+0.2
Liberal Democrats	2	1	0	+1	8.3	11.2	8,639	-3.8
BNP	0	0	0	0	0.0	15.2	11,646	+2.8
Green	0	0	0	0	0.0	0.7	504	+0.3
Independent	0	0	0	0	0.0	0.5	379	-0.3
Red and Green Alliance Party	0	0	0	0	0.0	0.1	66	+0.1

== Ward results ==
Abbey
Party	Candidate	Votes	%	±%
Labour	Steven Elling	1,835	54.5	+5.6
Liberal Democrats	David Nikel	810	24.0	+2.6
Conservative	Ewart Johnson	725	21.5	−8.2
Majority		1,025	30.4	+11.2
Turnout		3,370		
Labour hold		Swing		

Blackheath
Party	Candidate	Votes	%	±%
Labour	Robert Price	1,341	42.8	−1.4
Conservative	Debbie Elwell	1,027	32.8	−13.7
BNP	Ryan Brigdale	633	20.2	+20.2
Green	Aldo Mussi	132	4.2	+4.2
Majority		314	10.0	
Turnout		3,133		
Labour hold		Swing		

Bristnall
Party	Candidate	Votes	%	±%
Labour	Mary Griffin	1,255	45.2	−4.7
Conservative	Terry Grainger	1,149	41.3	+4.7
Liberal Democrats	Sandra Berisford	375	13.5	0.0
Majority		106	3.8	−9.6
Turnout		2,779		
Labour hold		Swing		

Charlemont with Grove Vale
Party	Candidate	Votes	%	±%
Conservative	Anne Hughes	1,460	37.5	−11.1
Labour	Ralph Perkins	970	24.9	+3.9
BNP	Arthur Copson	788	20.3	+20.3
Liberal Democrats	Martin Roebuck	671	17.3	−5.9
Majority		490	12.6	−12.8
Turnout		3,889		
Conservative hold		Swing		

Cradley Heath and Old Hill
Party	Candidate	Votes	%	±%
Labour	Ann Shackleton	1,483	45.1	−7.9
Conservative	Alan Nugent	989	30.1	−16.9
BNP	Martin Phillips	584	17.8	+17.8
Green	Theresa Yates	230	7.0	+7.0
Majority		494	15.0	+9.1
Turnout		3,286		
Labour hold		Swing		

Friar Park
Party	Candidate	Votes	%	±%
Labour	Joy Edis	1,168	41.7	−6.2
BNP	Scott Dale	868	31.0	+31.0
Conservative	Barry Nelson	620	22.1	−16.3
Liberal Democrats	Dorothy Brayshaw	145	5.2	−8.5
Majority		300	10.7	+1.2
Turnout		2,801		
Labour hold		Swing		

Great Barr with Yew Tree
Party	Candidate	Votes	%	±%
Liberal Democrats	Keith Allcock	1,207	32.5	+1.0
Labour	Steve Melia	955	25.7	+0.8
BNP	Terry Lewin	807	21.7	−3.5
Conservative	Margaret Macklin	747	20.1	+1.8
Majority		252	6.8	+0.5
Turnout		3,716		
Liberal Democrats gain from Conservative		Swing		

Great Bridge
Party	Candidate	Votes	%	±%
Labour	Peter Allen	1,417	45.3	+6.6
BNP	Jenny Howells	941	30.1	−15.0
Conservative	Mac Beckley	528	16.9	+16.9
Independent	Raymond Crawford	138	4.4	+4.4
Liberal Democrats	Philip Roberts	104	3.3	−13.0
Majority		476	15.2	
Turnout		3,128		
Labour hold		Swing		

Greets Green and Lyng
Party	Candidate	Votes	%	±%
Labour	Gurchuran Sidhu	1,448	47.5	+1.0
BNP	Gordon Howells	764	25.0	−2.5
Conservative	Elaine Fitzpatrick	620	20.3	+3.8
Liberal Democrats	Dot Jones	218	7.1	−1.4
Majority		684	22.4	+3.4
Turnout		3,050		
Labour hold		Swing		

Hateley Heath
Party	Candidate	Votes	%	±%
Labour	Yvonne Davies	1,591	48.7	+3.6
BNP	Alice Dale	964	29.5	−0.9
Conservative	Stephanie Page	444	13.6	+2.4
Liberal Democrats	Richard Mitchener	270	8.3	−5.0
Majority		627	19.2	+4.5
Turnout		3,269		
Labour hold		Swing		

Langley
Party	Candidate	Votes	%	±%
Labour	Martin Prestidge	1,453	47.3	+7.5
Conservative	Ronald Griffiths	729	23.7	−0.8
BNP	David Howells	666	21.7	−5.9
Liberal Democrats	Michael Allcock	226	7.4	−0.7
Majority		724	23.6	+11.4
Turnout		3,074		
Labour hold		Swing		

Newton
Party	Candidate	Votes	%	±%
Liberal Democrats	Martyn Smith	1,327	42.3	−0.6
Labour	David Hosell	1,075	34.3	+0.6
Conservative	Valerie Ward	733	23.4	0.0
Majority		252	8.0	−1.2
Turnout		3,135		
Liberal Democrats hold		Swing		

Oldbury
Party	Candidate	Votes	%	±%
Labour	Elaine Giles	2,041	64.4	−0.1
Conservative	Abdul Qayyum	1,129	35.6	+8.4
Majority		912	28.8	−8.5
Turnout		3,170		
Labour hold		Swing		

Old Warley
Party	Candidate	Votes	%	±%
Labour	Trevor Crumpton	1,572	45.8	+6.8
Conservative	David Hadley	1,401	40.8	−2.9
Liberal Democrats	Christopher Reed	462	13.4	−3.9
Majority		171	5.0	
Turnout		3,435		
Labour hold		Swing		

Princes End
Party	Candidate	Votes	%	±%
Labour	Raymond Howes	898	35.7	−4.8
BNP	Karen Parkes	878	34.9	−8.6
Conservative	Beatrice Owen	498	19.8	+3.8
Independent	June Newell	241	9.6	+9.6
Majority		20	0.8	
Turnout		2,515		
Labour hold		Swing		

Rowley
Party	Candidate	Votes	%	±%
Labour	Barbara Price	1,511	52.1	−4.0
Conservative	Chris Kelly	760	26.2	−17.7
BNP	John Salvage	489	16.9	+16.9
Green	Vicky Dunn	142	4.9	+4.9
Majority		751	25.9	+13.7
Turnout		2,902		
Labour hold		Swing		

St Pauls
Party	Candidate	Votes	%	±%
Labour	Patricia Davies	2,378	60.8	+7.3
Conservative	Nahim Rubani	1,534	39.2	+5.8
Majority		844	21.6	+1.5
Turnout		3,912		
Labour gain from Conservative		Swing		

Smethwick
Party	Candidate	Votes	%	±%
Labour	Keith Davies	1,611	53.6	−8.1
Conservative	Bhervinder Singh	810	26.9	+26.9
Liberal Democrats	Roger Prior	587	19.5	−11.1
Majority		801	26.6	−4.5
Turnout		3,008		
Labour hold		Swing		

Soho and Victoria
Party	Candidate	Votes	%	±%
Labour	Roger Horton	1,697	55.6	−9.5
Liberal Democrats	Shamim Ahmed	982	32.2	+8.3
Conservative	Victoria Barnett	305	10.0	+10.0
Red and Green Alliance Party	Shari Temochin	66	2.2	+2.2
Majority		715	23.4	−18.2
Turnout		3,050		
Labour hold		Swing		

Tipton Green
Party	Candidate	Votes	%	±%
Labour	Syeda Khatun	1,667	47.1	+11.4
BNP	Steven Parkes	1,024	28.9	−4.7
Conservative	Gaz Khan	581	16.4	−14.3
Liberal Democrats	Ronald Hackett	266	7.5	+7.5
Majority		643	18.2	+16.1
Turnout		3,538		
Labour hold		Swing		

Tividale
Party	Candidate	Votes	%	±%
Labour	David Hinton	1,309	41.6	+5.6
BNP	Sharon Butler	938	29.8	−7.2
Conservative	Robert Lawrence	567	18.0	+0.5
Liberal Democrats	Diane Gorton	333	10.6	+1.0
Majority		371	11.8	
Turnout		3,147		
Labour hold		Swing		

Wednesbury North
Party	Candidate	Votes	%	±%
Conservative	Elaine Costigan	1,559	55.9	−5.7
Labour	Tony Mallam	726	26.0	−0.5
BNP	Derrick Dale	504	18.1	+18.1
Majority		833	29.9	−5.2
Turnout		2,789		
Conservative hold		Swing		

Wednesbury South
Party	Candidate	Votes	%	±%
Labour	George Turton	1,365	40.7	+1.3
Conservative	Michael Middleton	996	29.7	+3.9
BNP	Mark Paskin	798	23.8	−4.0
Liberal Democrats	Bob Smith	198	5.9	−1.1
Majority		369	11.0	−0.6
Turnout		3,357		
Labour hold		Swing		

West Bromwich Central
Party	Candidate	Votes	%	±%
Labour	Bawa Dhallu	1,850	55.3	+1.2
Conservative	Robert White	1,036	31.0	+17.4
Liberal Democrats	Jarnail Sandhu	458	13.7	−18.6
Majority		814	24.3	+2.5
Turnout		3,344		
Labour hold		Swing		
