= 2016 Sandwell Metropolitan Borough Council election =

2016 local election in England

- 5 May 2016

One third (24) seats to Sandwell Borough Council
	First party	Second party	Third party
Party	Labour	UKIP	Conservative
Seats won	71	1	0
Seat change	▲1	Steady	Steady
- Map of the results
Council control before election
Labour
Council control after election
Labour

The 2016 Sandwell Metropolitan Borough Council election took place on 5 May 2016 to elect members of Sandwell Metropolitan Borough Council in England. This was on the same day as other local elections.

== Ward results ==
=== St Paul's Ward ===
St Paul's Ward
Party	Candidate	Votes	%	±%
Labour	Preet Gill	2,999	85.42	
Conservative	Elizabeth Brown	512	14.58	
Majority		2,487	70.83	
Turnout		3,511	35.93	
Labour hold		Swing		

=== Wednesbury North ===
Wednesbury North
Party	Candidate	Votes	%	±%
Labour	Peter Hughes	1,531	71.31	
Conservative	Matthew Longville	616	28.69	
Majority		915	42.62	
Turnout		2,147	23.16	
Labour hold		Swing		
