= 2015 Sandwell Metropolitan Borough Council election =

2015 local election in England

Map of the results

The 2015 Sandwell Metropolitan Borough Council election took place on 7 May 2015 to elect members of Sandwell Metropolitan Borough Council in England. It was held on the same day as other local elections.
