= 2000 Sandwell Metropolitan Borough Council election =

2000 UK local government election

The 2000 Sandwell Metropolitan Borough Council election took place on 4 May 2000 to elect members of Sandwell Metropolitan Borough Council in the West Midlands, England. One third of the council was up for election and the Labour Party stayed in overall control of the council.

After the election, the composition of the council was:

- Labour 55
- Liberal Democrat 10
- Conservative 6
- Independent 1

== Campaign ==
Before the election Labour ran the council with 58 councillors compared to 9 Liberal Democrats, 3 Conservatives and 1 independent, with 1 Labour seat being vacant. The vacant seat was in Oldbury ward, after the former councillor, Mohammed Niwaz, was convicted of fraud the previous December. Among those who were defending seats in the election was the leader of the council, Tarsem King, in West Bromwich Central ward.

Both the Liberal Democrat and Conservative parties were hoping to make gains after some recent school closures, as well as dissatisfaction with the national Labour government. The Liberal Democrats were hoping to gain Hateley Heath, after having won a seat there in a by-election the previous November, and Oldbury. Meanwhile, the Conservatives aimed to take Wednesbury South and were defending Charlemont after the councillor defected to them from the Liberal Democrats. Labour defended their record, pointing to the lowest council tax rise in the region, and hoped to improve on recent low turnouts.

== Election result ==
The results saw the Labour Party stay in control of the council, but they did lose some seats. The Conservatives gained the seats of Old Warley and Princes End from Labour, while the Liberal Democrats took Hateley Heath from Labour. Alan Burkitt also held off the Liberal Democrats in Charlemont for the Conservatives.

Sandwell local election result 2000
Party	Seats	Gains	Losses	Net gain/loss	Seats %	Votes %	Votes	+/−
Labour	17			-4	70.8	46.3	22,964	-8.6
Conservative	4			+3	16.7	34.5	17,119	+9.3
Liberal Democrats	3			+1	12.5	13.1	6,489	-2.6
Independent	0			0	0.0	4.2	2,076	+1.7
BNP	0			0	0.0	1.6	781	+0.2
National Front	0			0	0.0	0.3	150	+0.2
Socialist	0			0	0.0	0.1	68	-0.2

== Ward results ==
Abbey
Party	Candidate	Votes	%	±%
Labour	Ann Jaron	1,698	60.6	+1.0
Conservative	Ewart Johnson	764	27.3	−2.1
Liberal Democrats	Roger Prior	339	12.1	+1.1
Majority		934	33.3	+3.1
Turnout		2,801	31.1	−0.7

Blackheath
Party	Candidate	Votes	%	±%
Labour	Glenn Harris	854	43.8	−22.0
Independent	Mary Docker	514	26.3	+26.3
Conservative	June Park	441	22.6	−0.1
Liberal Democrats	Walter Bowdler	143	7.3	−4.1
Majority		340	17.4	−2.7
Turnout		1,952	21.3	+1.2

Bristnall
Party	Candidate	Votes	%	±%
Labour	Malcolm Bridges	1,044	53.4	−8.2
Conservative	Roger Hickman	911	46.6	+18.0
Majority		133	6.8	−26.2
Turnout		1,955	20.6	−3.2

Charlemont
Party	Candidate	Votes	%	±%
Conservative	Alan Burkitt	1,263	49.0	+21.9
Liberal Democrats	Mary Wilson	795	30.8	−10.4
Labour	David Hallam	522	20.2	−11.5
Majority		468	18.1	
Turnout		2,580	28.2	+0.5

Cradley Heath and Old Hill
Party	Candidate	Votes	%	±%
Labour	Margaret James	986	53.5	−13.3
Conservative	Leonard Law	672	36.5	+13.7
Liberal Democrats	Malcolm Wilson	184	10.0	−0.4
Majority		314	17.0	−27.0
Turnout		1,842	20.0	−2.3

Friar Park
Party	Candidate	Votes	%	±%
Labour	William Melia	698	50.9	−17.9
Conservative	Margaret Smith	519	37.9	+6.7
Liberal Democrats	Charles Simms	154	11.2	+11.2
Majority		179	13.1	−24.6
Turnout		1,371	16.4	−1.9

Great Barr
Party	Candidate	Votes	%	±%
Liberal Democrats	David Wainwright	1,077	40.7	−9.0
Conservative	Robert Lawrence	994	37.5	+14.4
Labour	Roy Melia	521	19.7	−7.5
Independent Liberal Democrat	Christian Burkitt	56	2.1	+2.1
Majority		83	3.1	−19.4
Turnout		2,648	26.8	−1.4

Great Bridge
Party	Candidate	Votes	%	±%
Labour	Maureen Whitehouse	750	48.8	−11.0
Conservative	Philip Mansell	510	33.2	+13.1
National Front	James Barry	150	9.8	+9.8
Liberal Democrats	Brian Burkitt	128	8.3	+1.1
Majority		240	15.6	−24.0
Turnout		1,538	16.0	−0.8

Greets Green and Lyng
Party	Candidate	Votes	%	±%
Labour	John Edwards	1,063	61.7	−14.2
Conservative	Rosemarie Campbell	497	28.9	+13.0
Liberal Democrats	Lynne Yardley	162	9.4	+1.1
Majority		566	32.9	−27.1
Turnout		1,722	28.6	+6.8

Hateley Heath
Party	Candidate	Votes	%	±%
Liberal Democrats	Mark Handy	762	48.0	+17.6
Labour	Joyce Edis	548	34.6	−19.6
Conservative	Raymond Nock	276	17.4	+2.1
Majority		214	13.5	
Turnout		1,586	17.4	−0.1

Langley
Party	Candidate	Votes	%	±%
Labour	Pauline Hinton	1,127	47.1	−13.4
Conservative	Roland Hill	962	40.2	+12.2
Liberal Democrats	Julia Garrett	302	12.6	+1.1
Majority		165	6.9	−25.6
Turnout		2,391	24.6	−0.1

Newton
Party	Candidate	Votes	%	±%
Liberal Democrats	Martyn Smith	1,324	52.6	−0.8
Labour	Thomas Slater	599	23.8	−6.9
Conservative	Anthony Ward	593	23.6	+7.7
Majority		725	28.8	+6.1
Turnout		2,516	27.1	−1.7

Old Warley
Party	Candidate	Votes	%	±%
Conservative	Karen Bissell	1,579	61.3	+18.1
Labour	Kathleen Burns	995	38.7	−8.0
Majority		584	22.7	
Turnout		2,574	29.5	−0.3

Oldbury
Party	Candidate	Votes	%	±%
Labour	Geoffrey Taylor	1,108	60.1	−9.3
Conservative	Bhajan Shokar	461	25.0	+10.7
Liberal Democrats	Diane Gorton	276	15.0	−1.3
Majority		647	35.1	−18.0
Turnout		1,845	22.5	−10.6

Princes End
Party	Candidate	Votes	%	±%
Conservative	June Newell	555	46.7	+26.1
Labour	Brian Southall	533	44.8	−4.5
Liberal Democrats	Philip Roberts	101	8.5	+3.1
Majority		22	1.9	
Turnout		1,189	12.2	+0.0

Rowley
Party	Candidate	Votes	%	±%
Labour	William Thomas	1,110	55.6	−11.1
Conservative	John Raybould	563	28.2	+14.5
Independent	Fred Hadley	323	16.2	+3.3
Majority		547	27.4	−25.6
Turnout		1,996	20.8	+0.5

Smethwick
Party	Candidate	Votes	%	±%
Labour	Frederick Smith	1,181	66.6	−4.8
Conservative	Beryl Hickman	591	33.4	+14.7
Majority		590	33.3	−19.3
Turnout		1,772	20.8	−3.5

Soho and Victoria
Party	Candidate	Votes	%	±%
Labour	Roger Horton	846	70.2	−3.1
Conservative	Jeanette Hill	359	29.8	+9.7
Majority		487	40.4	−12.9
Turnout		1,205	22.4	−3.8

St Pauls
Party	Candidate	Votes	%	±%
Labour	Jagwant Gill	1,246	44.8	−7.1
Independent Labour	Balkar Sandhu	1,183	42.6	+10.0
Conservative	William Shipman	350	12.6	+1.2
Majority		63	2.3	−17.0
Turnout		2,779	34.5	+4.0

Tipton Green
Party	Candidate	Votes	%	±%
Labour	Ahmadul Haque	1,455	44.2	−0.1
Conservative	Alison Jones	880	26.7	−1.6
BNP	Stephen Edwards	781	23.7	+6.5
Liberal Democrats	Anthony Underhill	108	3.3	−2.0
Socialist	Ian Barton	68	2.1	−2.8
Majority		575	17.5	+1.5
Turnout		3,292	27.3	+2.4

Tividale
Party	Candidate	Votes	%	±%
Labour	Douglas Parish	767	46.8	−10.4
Conservative	Steven Hockley	642	39.2	+14.1
Liberal Democrats	Roger Bradley	230	14.0	−3.6
Majority		125	7.6	−24.5
Turnout		1,639	17.4	−0.8

Wednesbury North
Party	Candidate	Votes	%	±%
Conservative	Nellie Collett	1,212	62.2	+2.2
Labour	Elaine Giles	737	37.8	+1.2
Majority		475	24.4	+0.9
Turnout		1,949	20.7	−5.3

Wednesbury South
Party	Candidate	Votes	%	±%
Labour	Robert Evans	1,101	52.4	−3.9
Conservative	Margaret Dixon	882	42.0	+5.1
Liberal Democrats	Anthony Wilkinson	119	5.7	−1.1
Majority		219	10.4	−9.0
Turnout		2,102	22.6	+0.3

West Bromwich Central
Party	Candidate	Votes	%	±%
Labour	Tarsem King	1,475	61.4	−4.1
Conservative	Anne Hughes	643	26.8	+5.2
Liberal Democrats	Samantha Ford	285	11.9	−1.0
Majority		832	34.6	−9.3
Turnout		2,403	28.6	+0.3
