= 1998 Sandwell Metropolitan Borough Council election =

1998 UK local government election

The 1998 Sandwell Metropolitan Borough Council election took place on 7 May 1998 to elect members of Sandwell Metropolitan Borough Council in the West Midlands, England. One-third of the council was up for election and the Labour Party stayed in overall control of the council.

After the election, the composition of the council was:

- Labour 60
- Liberal Democrat 9
- Conservative 2
- Independent 1

== Campaign ==
Before the election Labour held 60 of the 72 seats, with the main opposition provided by the Liberal Democrats. 24 seats were contested in the election, including 20 Labour, 3 Liberal Democrat and 1 Conservative seats. These included the Liberal Democrat group leader, Sadie Smith, in Great Barr, and the Conservative group leader, Bill Archer, in Wednesbury North.

== Election result ==
The results saw no changes in party control, meaning that Labour continued to run the council.

Sandwell local election result 1998
Party	Seats	Gains	Losses	Net gain/loss	Seats %	Votes %	Votes	+/−
Labour	20	0	0	0	83.3	55.1		
Liberal Democrats	3	0	0	0	12.5	16.0		
Conservative	1	0	0	0	4.2	24.3		
