= 2002 Sandwell Metropolitan Borough Council election =

2002 UK local government election

The 2002 Sandwell Metropolitan Borough Council election took place on 2 May 2002 to elect members of Sandwell Metropolitan Borough Council in the West Midlands, England. One third of the council was up for election and the Labour Party stayed in overall control of the council.

After the election, the composition of the council was:

- Labour 56
- Conservative 9
- Liberal Democrat 6
- Vacant 1

== Campaign ==
Before the election the Labour Party controlled the council with 55 seats, compared to 8 Conservatives, 7 Liberal Democrats and 1 independent. A further seat was vacant after the recent death of Labour councillor Fred Smith.

Candidates in the election included five independents who were standing in protest at a decision by the council to close a swimming pool in Tipton and a nearby leisure centre. The Tipton area also saw 2 candidates from the British National Party standing in the wards of Princes End and Tipton Green.

== Election result ==
The results saw Labour easily keep its strong majority on the council after winning 19 of the 24 seats contested. Neither the British National Party, nor the candidate from the Freedom Party managed to win a seat on the council, but the British National Party did win 24% in Princes End ward.

Sandwell local election result 2002
| Party | Seats | Gains | Losses | Net gain/loss | Seats % | Votes % | Votes | +/− |
|---|---|---|---|---|---|---|---|---|
| Labour | 19 | | | +1 | 79.2 | 51.6 | 31,948 | +5.3% |
| Conservative | 3 | | | +1 | 12.5 | 27.5 | 17,054 | -7.0% |
| Liberal Democrats | 2 | | | -1 | 8.3 | 11.2 | 6,967 | -1.9% |
| Independent | 0 | | | -1 | 0 | 3.4 | 2,116 | -0.8% |
| Socialist Labour | 0 | | | 0 | 0 | 3.1 | 1,897 | +3.1% |
| Freedom Party | 0 | | | 0 | 0 | 1.7 | 1,070 | +1.7% |
| BNP | 0 | | | 0 | 0 | 1.4 | 870 | +1.4% |
| UKIP | 0 | | | 0 | 0 | 0.0 | 22 | +0.0% |

== Ward results ==
Abbey
| Party | Candidate | Votes | % | ±% |
|---|---|---|---|---|
| Labour | Steven Eling | 1,491 | 54.3 | −6.3 |
| Conservative | John McHard | 724 | 26.4 | −0.9 |
| Liberal Democrats | Roger Prior | 397 | 14.5 | +2.4 |
| Socialist Labour | Malcolm Connigale | 133 | 4.8 | +4.8 |
| Majority | | 767 | 27.9 | −5.4 |
| Turnout | | 2,745 | | |

Blackheath
| Party | Candidate | Votes | % | ±% |
|---|---|---|---|---|
| Labour | David Walker | 1,375 | 54.1 | +10.3 |
| Conservative | Mary Docker | 919 | 36.2 | +13.6 |
| Liberal Democrats | Walter Bowdler | 246 | 9.7 | +2.4 |
| Majority | | 456 | 18.0 | +0.6 |
| Turnout | | 2,540 | | |

Bristnall
| Party | Candidate | Votes | % | ±% |
|---|---|---|---|---|
| Labour | Lois Griffin | 1,384 | 54.0 | +0.6 |
| Conservative | Terry Grainger | 1,014 | 39.6 | −7.0 |
| Socialist Labour | Sukhjinder Clair | 163 | 6.4 | +6.4 |
| Majority | | 370 | 14.4 | +7.6 |
| Turnout | | 2,561 | | |

Charlemont
| Party | Candidate | Votes | % | ±% |
|---|---|---|---|---|
| Conservative | Anne Hughes | 1,100 | 38.7 | −10.3 |
| Liberal Democrats | Anthony Underhill | 1,009 | 35.5 | +4.7 |
| Labour | Babu Patel | 730 | 25.7 | +5.5 |
| Majority | | 91 | 3.2 | −14.9 |
| Turnout | | 2,839 | | |

Cradley Heath and Old Hill
| Party | Candidate | Votes | % | ±% |
|---|---|---|---|---|
| Labour | Glenis Webb | 1,462 | 62.1 | +8.6 |
| Conservative | James Musk | 894 | 37.9 | +1.4 |
| Majority | | 568 | 24.1 | +7.1 |
| Turnout | | 2,356 | | |

Friar Park
| Party | Candidate | Votes | % | ±% |
|---|---|---|---|---|
| Labour | Joyce Edis | 1,068 | 62.7 | +11.8 |
| Conservative | Janet Williams | 471 | 27.6 | −10.3 |
| Liberal Democrats | Christopher Reed | 165 | 9.7 | −1.5 |
| Majority | | 597 | 35.0 | +21.9 |
| Turnout | | 1,704 | | |

Great Barr
| Party | Candidate | Votes | % | ±% |
|---|---|---|---|---|
| Liberal Democrats | Sadie Smith | 1,393 | 44.4 | +3.7 |
| Labour | Sharron Devonport | 895 | 28.5 | +8.8 |
| Conservative | Robert Lawrence | 847 | 27.0 | −10.5 |
| Majority | | 498 | 15.9 | +12.8 |
| Turnout | | 3,135 | | |

Great Bridge
| Party | Candidate | Votes | % | ±% |
|---|---|---|---|---|
| Labour | Derek Rowley | 1,105 | 47.4 | −1.4 |
| Independent | Fred Perry | 817 | 35.0 | +35.0 |
| Conservative | Philip Mansell | 409 | 17.5 | −15.7 |
| Majority | | 288 | 12.4 | −3.2 |
| Turnout | | 2,331 | | |

Greets Green and Lyng
| Party | Candidate | Votes | % | ±% |
|---|---|---|---|---|
| Labour | Gurchuran Sudhu | 1,169 | 58.5 | −3.2 |
| Conservative | Rosemarie Campbell | 471 | 23.6 | −5.3 |
| Liberal Democrats | Philip Roberts | 358 | 17.9 | +8.5 |
| Majority | | 698 | 34.9 | +2.0 |
| Turnout | | 1,998 | | |

Hateley Heath
| Party | Candidate | Votes | % | ±% |
|---|---|---|---|---|
| Labour | Terry Williams | 989 | 48.2 | +13.6 |
| Liberal Democrats | Mary Wilson | 799 | 38.9 | −9.1 |
| Conservative | Gaynor Skeldon | 265 | 12.9 | −4.5 |
| Majority | | 190 | 9.3 | |
| Turnout | | 2,053 | | |

Langley
| Party | Candidate | Votes | % | ±% |
|---|---|---|---|---|
| Labour | Patrick Sullivan | 1,601 | 55.3 | +8.2 |
| Conservative | Roland Hill | 915 | 31.6 | −8.6 |
| Liberal Democrats | Yvonne Reid | 285 | 9.8 | −2.8 |
| Socialist Labour | Jasvir Gill | 96 | 3.3 | +3.3 |
| Majority | | 686 | 23.7 | +16.8 |
| Turnout | | 2,897 | | |

Newton
| Party | Candidate | Votes | % | ±% |
|---|---|---|---|---|
| Liberal Democrats | Anthony Fowler | 1,440 | 45.2 | −7.4 |
| Labour | Simon Hackett | 1,209 | 37.9 | +14.1 |
| Conservative | Anthony Ward | 485 | 15.2 | −8.4 |
| Socialist Labour | Baldeesh Singh | 54 | 1.7 | +1.7 |
| Majority | | 231 | 7.2 | −21.6 |
| Turnout | | 3,188 | | |

Old Warley
| Party | Candidate | Votes | % | ±% |
|---|---|---|---|---|
| Conservative | Nicholas Meacham | 1,266 | 43.6 | −17.7 |
| Labour | Michael Davis | 1,202 | 41.4 | +2.7 |
| Independent | Deborah Blewitt | 437 | 15.0 | +15.0 |
| Majority | | 64 | 2.2 | −20.5 |
| Turnout | | 2,905 | | |

Oldbury
| Party | Candidate | Votes | % | ±% |
|---|---|---|---|---|
| Labour | Babu Bawa | 1,358 | 51.9 | −8.2 |
| Conservative | Jeanette Hill | 571 | 21.8 | −3.2 |
| Socialist Labour | Amarjit Singh | 361 | 13.8 | +13.8 |
| Liberal Democrats | Diane Gorton | 329 | 12.6 | −2.4 |
| Majority | | 787 | 30.0 | −5.1 |
| Turnout | | 2,619 | | |

Princes End
| Party | Candidate | Votes | % | ±% |
|---|---|---|---|---|
| Labour | Raymond Howes | 894 | 40.6 | −4.2 |
| Conservative | Richard Geddes | 543 | 24.7 | −22.0 |
| BNP | John Salvage | 536 | 24.3 | +24.3 |
| Independent | Robert Roper | 128 | 5.8 | +5.8 |
| Independent | Alison Jones | 79 | 3.6 | +3.6 |
| UKIP | Kevin Walker | 22 | 1.0 | +1.0 |
| Majority | | 351 | 15.9 | |
| Turnout | | 2,202 | | |

Rowley
| Party | Candidate | Votes | % | ±% |
|---|---|---|---|---|
| Labour | Barbara Price | 1,578 | 65.7 | +10.1 |
| Conservative | Joanne Hadley | 825 | 34.3 | +6.1 |
| Majority | | 753 | 31.3 | +3.9 |
| Turnout | | 2,403 | | |

Smethwick
| Party | Candidate | Votes | % | ±% |
|---|---|---|---|---|
| Labour | Linda Horton | 1,847 | 77.1 | +10.5 |
| Conservative | Ewart Johnson | 549 | 22.9 | −10.5 |
| Majority | | 1,298 | 54.2 | +20.9 |
| Turnout | | 2,396 | | |

Soho and Victoria
| Party | Candidate | Votes | % | ±% |
|---|---|---|---|---|
| Labour | Mohammad Rouf | 1,178 | 72.8 | +2.6 |
| Socialist Labour | Rajinder Kumar | 260 | 16.1 | +16.1 |
| Conservative | William Shipman | 181 | 11.2 | −18.6 |
| Majority | | 918 | 56.7 | +16.3 |
| Turnout | | 1,619 | | |

St Paul's
| Party | Candidate | Votes | % | ±% |
|---|---|---|---|---|
| Labour | Gurinder Josan | 2,095 | 68.8 | +24.0 |
| Socialist Labour | Ranjit Tagger | 569 | 18.7 | +18.7 |
| Conservative | Manjit Lall | 381 | 12.5 | −0.1 |
| Majority | | 1,526 | 50.1 | +47.8 |
| Turnout | | 3,045 | | |

Tipton Green
| Party | Candidate | Votes | % | ±% |
|---|---|---|---|---|
| Labour | Ian Jones | 2,030 | 45.7 | +1.5 |
| Freedom Party | Stephen Edwards | 1,070 | 24.1 | +24.1 |
| Conservative | Ian Davies | 461 | 10.4 | −16.3 |
| Independent | Malcolm Beckley | 394 | 8.9 | +8.9 |
| BNP | Kenneth Salvage | 334 | 7.5 | −16.2 |
| Socialist Labour | Surinder Sandhu | 154 | 3.5 | +3.5 |
| Majority | | 960 | 21.6 | +4.1 |
| Turnout | | 4,443 | | |

Tividale
| Party | Candidate | Votes | % | ±% |
|---|---|---|---|---|
| Labour | David Hinton | 1,205 | 50.4 | +3.6 |
| Conservative | Steven Hockley | 676 | 28.3 | −10.9 |
| Independent | Michael Davenport | 261 | 10.9 | +10.9 |
| Liberal Democrats | Roger Bradley | 247 | 10.3 | −3.7 |
| Majority | | 529 | 22.1 | +14.5 |
| Turnout | | 2,389 | | |

Wednesbury North
| Party | Candidate | Votes | % | ±% |
|---|---|---|---|---|
| Conservative | William Archer | 1,634 | 68.6 | +6.4 |
| Labour | Elaine Giles | 748 | 31.4 | −6.4 |
| Majority | | 886 | 37.2 | +12.8 |
| Turnout | | 2,382 | | |

Wednesbury South
| Party | Candidate | Votes | % | ±% |
|---|---|---|---|---|
| Labour | Roy Melia | 1,410 | 58.7 | +6.3 |
| Conservative | Alan Nugent | 991 | 41.3 | −0.7 |
| Majority | | 419 | 17.5 | +7.1 |
| Turnout | | 2,401 | | |

West Bromwich Central
| Party | Candidate | Votes | % | ±% |
|---|---|---|---|---|
| Labour | Linda Turton | 1,925 | 68.9 | +7.5 |
| Conservative | Bhajan Shoker | 462 | 16.5 | −10.3 |
| Liberal Democrats | Samantha Ford | 299 | 10.7 | −1.2 |
| Socialist Labour | Dharam Pal | 107 | 3.8 | +3.8 |
| Majority | | 1,463 | 52.4 | +17.8 |
| Turnout | | 2,793 | | |
