= Gurinder Josan =

British politician (born 1972)

Gurinder Josan CBE MP
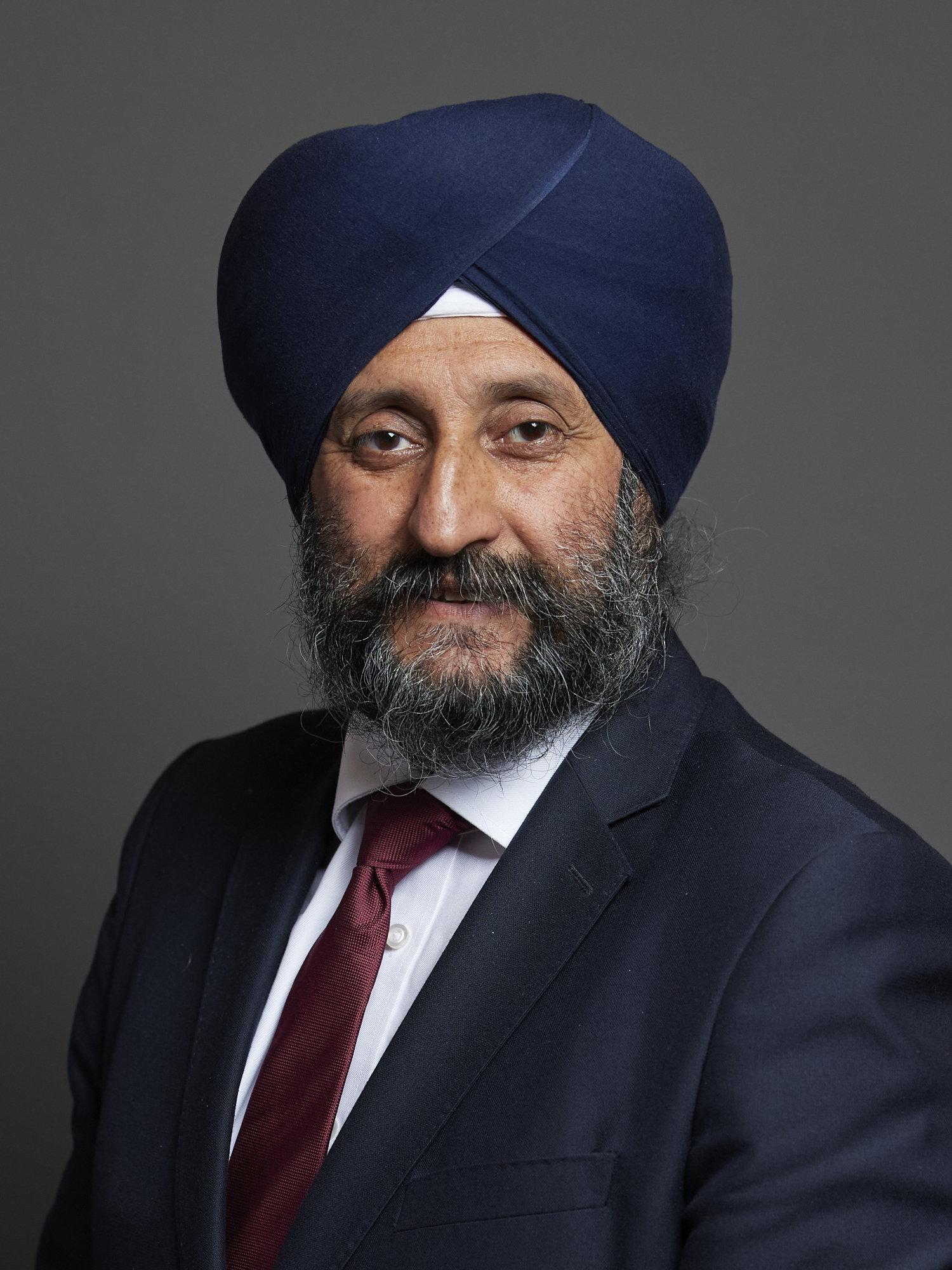
- Official portrait, 2024

Member of Parliament for Smethwick
- Incumbent
- Assumed office 4 July 2024
- Preceded by: New constituency
- Majority: 11,188 (31.9%)

Personal details
- Born: Gurinder Singh Josan; August 1972 (age 53) Birmingham, England
- Party: Labour

Gurinder Singh Josan CBE (born August 1972) is a British politician who has served as Member of Parliament (MP) for Smethwick for Labour since the 2024 general election.

== Early life and career ==
Josan served on Sandwell Metropolitan Borough Council, and sits on Labour's National Executive Committee and the West Midlands' Strategic Policing and Crime Board.

He was elected as councillor for the St Paul's ward of Sandwell Metropolitan Borough in the 2002 Sandwell Metropolitan Borough Council election and he served until 2010.

He is a trustee of the HOPE Not Hate charitable trust, a former trustee of the Guru Nanak Gurdwara, Smethwick, a former member of the national executive of the Sikh Council UK, and is a governor for three schools. He is a landlord and owns eight rental properties.

He was elected to the National Executive Committee of the Labour Party in April 2020.

On 30 May 2024, Josan was selected as Labour's parliamentary candidate to contest the Smethwick constituency in the 2024 United Kingdom general election. He won the seat with 16,858 votes (48.0%), and a majority of 11,188 (31.6%).

== Awards ==
He was appointed a Commander of the Order of the British Empire (CBE) in the 2019 New Year Honours, "for political service".
