= 2014 Sandwell Metropolitan Borough Council election =

2014 UK local government election

- 22 May 2014

One third (24) seats to Sandwell Borough Council
	First party	Second party	Third party
Party	Labour	UKIP	Conservative
Seats won	70	1	1
Seat change	▲2	▲1	▼2
- Map of the results
Council control before election
Labour
Council control after election
Labour

The 2014 Sandwell Metropolitan Borough Council election took place on 22 May 2014 to elect members of Sandwell Metropolitan Borough Council in England. This was on the same day as other local elections.
