= 2019 Sandwell Metropolitan Borough Council election =

England local election

Map of the results

The 2019 Sandwell Metropolitan Borough Council election took place on 2 May 2019 to elect members of Sandwell Metropolitan Borough Council in England. This was on the same day as other local elections.

== Results summary ==
2019 Sandwell Metropolitan Borough Council election
Party	This election			Full council			This election		
Party	Seats	Net	Seats %	Other	Total	Total %	Votes	Votes %	+/−
Labour	24	Steady	100.0	48	72	100.0	31,823	58.6	-9.9
Conservative	0	Steady	0.0	0	0	0.0	10,077	18.5	-5.9
Green	0	Steady	0.0	0	0	0.0	5,326	9.8	+5.2
Independent	0	Steady	0.0	0	0	0.0	2,730	5.0	+4.2
UKIP	0	Steady	0.0	0	0	0.0	1,800	3.3	+3.1
For Britain	0	Steady	0.0	0	0	0.0	1,020	1.9	+0.9
Liberal Democrats	0	Steady	0.0	0	0	0.0	924	1.7	+1.3
Black Country Party	0	Steady	0.0	0	0	0.0	568	1.0	New
Yeshua	0	Steady	0.0	0	0	0.0	76	0.1	0.0

== Ward results ==
=== Abbey ===
Abbey
Party	Candidate	Votes	%	±%
Labour	Ahmad Bostan	1,406	54.8	
Green	Michael Allen	597	23.2	
Conservative	Robin Bird	358	13.9	
Liberal Democrats	Karl Renar	207	8.1	
Majority				
Turnout		2,619	31.6	
Labour hold		Swing		

=== Blackheath ===
Blackheath
Party	Candidate	Votes	%	±%
Labour	Thabiso Mabena	726	33.4	
Conservative	Bob Dunn	620	28.5	
UKIP	David Westwood	457	21.0	
Black Country Party	Ian Bradshaw	253	11.6	
Green	Aldo Mussi	120	5.5	
Majority				
Turnout		2,185	23.9	
Labour hold		Swing		

=== Bristnall ===
Bristnall
Party	Candidate	Votes	%	±%
Labour	Saikha Kausar	900	46.3	
Conservative	Connor Jones	537	27.6	
Green	Susan O'Dell	506	26.0	
Majority				
Turnout		1,998	22.3	
Labour hold		Swing		

=== Charlemont with Grove Vale ===
Charlemont with Grove Vale
Party	Candidate	Votes	%	±%
Labour	Elizabeth Giles	1,145	46.2	
Conservative	Lee Williams	761	30.7	
UKIP	Graham Nock	430	17.3	
For Britain	Sam Harding	144	5.8	
Majority				
Turnout		2,510	27.3	
Labour hold		Swing		

=== Cradley Heath and Old Hill ===
Cradley Heath and Old Hill
Party	Candidate	Votes	%	±%
Labour	Ann Shackleton	1,149	51.2	
UKIP	Simon Roberts	487	21.7	
Conservative	Balhar Ramewal	349	15.5	
Green	Paul Connor	175	7.8	
Liberal Democrats	Robert Johns	86	3.8	
Majority				
Turnout		2,256	22.5	
Labour hold		Swing		

=== Friar Park ===
Friar Park
Party	Candidate	Votes	%	±%
Labour	Karen Simms	719	44.7	
Independent	Wayne Trinder	562	35.0	
Conservative	Bob Willetts	250	15.6	
Yeshua	Colin Rankine	76	4.7	
Majority				
Turnout		1,637	18.8	
Labour hold		Swing		

=== Great Barr with Yew Tree ===
Great Barr with Yew Tree
Party	Candidate	Votes	%	±%
Labour	Gurdesh Gill	1,254	47.0	
Conservative	Paul Kearns	465	17.4	
For Britain	Lorraine Binsley	344	12.9	
Independent	Shirley Hosell	340	12.7	
Liberal Democrats	Stephen Pimm	144	5.4	
Green	Daniela Waugh	120	4.5	
Majority				
Turnout		2,684	27.7	
Labour hold		Swing		

=== Great Bridge ===
Great Bridge
Party	Candidate	Votes	%	±%
Labour	Pete Allen	1,156	72.8	
Conservative	Stuart Bate	432	27.2	
Majority				
Turnout		1,707	18.0	
Labour hold		Swing		

=== Great Green and Lyng ===
Great Green and Lyng
Party	Candidate	Votes	%	±%
Labour	Jackie Taylor	1,684	74.0	
Conservative	Judith Willetts	344	15.1	
Green	Fiona Pitt	249	10.9	
Majority				
Turnout		2,320	26.3	
Labour hold		Swing		

=== Hateley Heath ===
Hateley Heath
Party	Candidate	Votes	%	±%
Labour	Kay Millar	1,575	75.6	
Conservative	John Stockall	508	24.4	
Majority				
Turnout		2,219	22.7	
Labour hold		Swing		

=== Langley ===
Langley
Party	Candidate	Votes	%	±%
Labour	Yvonne Davies	1,221	60.2	
Conservative	Archer Williams	442	21.8	
Green	Frederic Lacroix	365	18.0	
Majority				
Turnout		2,078	22.4	
Labour hold		Swing		

=== Newton ===
Newton
Party	Candidate	Votes	%	±%
Labour	Richard McVittie	817	36.8	
Independent	Dave Hosell	512	23.1	
Liberal Democrats	Bertam Richards	333	15.0	
Conservative	Pauline Williams	328	14.8	
For Britain	Stephen Latham	131	5.9	
Green	Hannah Valenzuela	100	4.5	
Majority				
Turnout		2,233	26.0	
Labour hold		Swing		

=== Oldbury ===
Oldbury
Party	Candidate	Votes	%	±%
Labour	Suzanne Hartwell	1,759	72.9	
Conservative	Kerntian Keri	364	15.1	
Green	Jody Waugh	290	12.0	
Majority				
Turnout		2,453	25.6	
Labour hold		Swing		

=== Old Warley ===
Old Warley
Party	Candidate	Votes	%	±%
Labour	Richard Jones	979	45.3	
Conservative	Jeffrey Regha	516	23.9	
Black Country Party	Jason Dickens	315	14.6	
Green	Samantha Lyster	199	9.2	
Liberal Democrats	Bryan Manley-Green	154	7.1	
Majority				
Turnout		2,181	24.1	
Labour hold		Swing		

=== Princes End ===
Princes End
Party	Candidate	Votes	%	±%
Labour	Stephen Jones	599	39.4	
UKIP	Paul Blundell	426	28.0	
Conservative	Scott Chapman	302	19.9	
Independent	James Marsh	193	12.7	
Majority				
Turnout		1,531	16.8	
Labour hold		Swing		

=== Rowley ===
Rowley
Party	Candidate	Votes	%	±%
Labour	Shaheen Akhtar	759	38.0	
Independent	Paul Rudge	533	26.7	
Conservative	Satpal Singh	457	22.9	
Green	Heather Allen	246	12.3	
Majority				
Turnout		2,029	21.3	
Labour hold		Swing		

=== Smethwick ===
Smethwick
Party	Candidate	Votes	%	±%
Labour	Manjit Gill	1,863	72.4	
Green	Stephanie Buckman	365	14.2	
Conservative	Colin Clark	344	13.4	
Majority				
Turnout		2,577	27.3	
Labour hold		Swing		

=== Soho and Victoria ===
Soho and Victoria
Party	Candidate	Votes	%	±%
Labour	Zahir Hussain	2,285	80.2	
Green	Robert Buckman	298	10.5	
Conservative	Suki Nandra	267	9.4	
Majority				
Turnout		2,869	29.3	
Labour hold		Swing		

=== St. Paul's ===
St. Paul's
Party	Candidate	Votes	%	±%
Labour	Zahoor Ahmed	2,729	82.3	
Conservative	Mohammad Hussain	319	9.6	
Green	Fabienne Ottridge	266	8.0	
Majority				
Turnout		3,353	33.9	
Labour hold		Swing		

=== Tipton Green ===
Tipton Green
Party	Candidate	Votes	%	±%
Labour	Syeda Khatun	1,405	58.5	
Green	Richard Jeffcoat	563	23.4	
Conservative	Sam Wilkes	435	18.1	
Majority				
Turnout		2,474	23.8	
Labour hold		Swing		

=== Tividale ===
Tividale
Party	Candidate	Votes	%	±%
Labour	Lorraine Ashman	1,051	54.3	
Conservative	Narinder Garcha	446	23.1	
Green	Keir Williams	437	22.6	
Majority				
Turnout		1,978	21.7	
Labour hold		Swing		

=== Wednesbury North ===
Wednesbury North
Party	Candidate	Votes	%	±%
Labour	Elaine Costigan	1,436	62.3	
For Britain	Darryl Magher	401	17.4	
Conservative	Steve Simcox	311	13.5	
Green	Mark Redding	156	6.8	
Majority				
Turnout		2,319	25.4	
Labour hold		Swing		

=== Wednesbury South ===
Wednesbury South
Party	Candidate	Votes	%	±%
Labour	Olwen Jones	1,243	55.5	
Independent	Lynn Chawner	590	26.4	
Conservative	Keith Lawley	405	18.1	
Majority				
Turnout		2,271	22.9	
Labour hold		Swing		

=== West Bromwich Central ===
West Bromwich Central
Party	Candidate	Votes	%	±%
Labour	Bawa Dhallu	1,963	71.3	
Conservative	Elizabeth Brown	516	18.7	
Green	Ryan Ottridge	274	10.0	
Majority				
Turnout		2,792	28.9	
Labour hold		Swing		
