= 2021 Sandwell Metropolitan Borough Council election =

2021 UK local government election

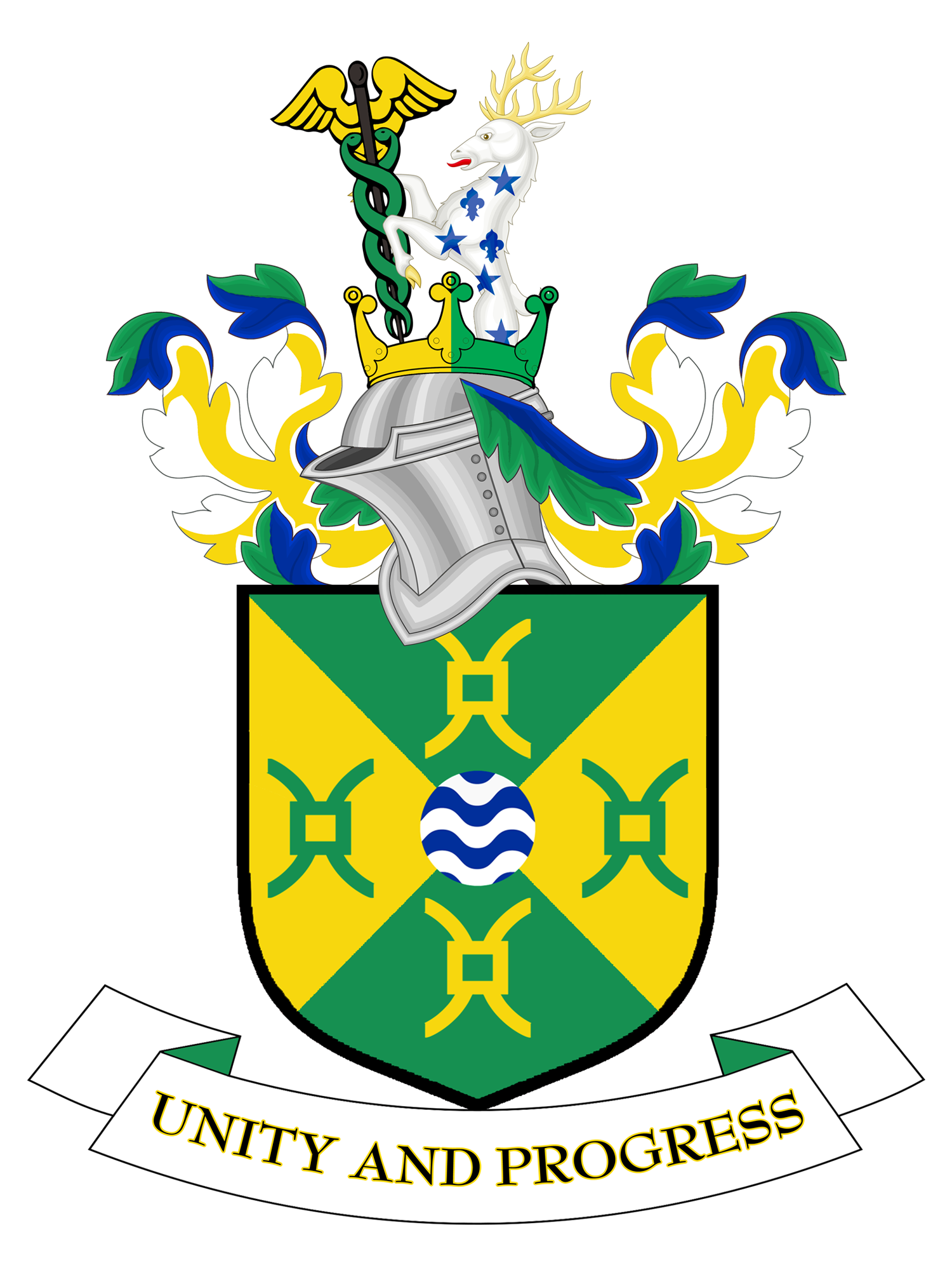

Map showing the results of the 2021 Sandwell Metropolitan Borough Council election

The 2021 Sandwell Metropolitan Borough Council election took place on 6 May 2021 to elect members of the Sandwell Metropolitan Borough Council in England. It coincided with other local elections across the United Kingdom. One-third of the seats were up for election, with three wards (Old Warley, Rowley, and Wednesbury South) electing two councillors.

== Results ==
2021 Sandwell Metropolitan Borough Council election
| Party | This election | | | Full council | | | This election | | |
| Party | Seats | Net | Seats % | Other | Total | Total % | Votes | Votes % | +/− |
|---|---|---|---|---|---|---|---|---|---|
| Labour | 18 | ▼9 | 66.7 | 40 | 58 | 81.7 | 39,053 | 53.1 | -5.5 |
| Conservative | 9 | ▲9 | 33.3 | 0 | 9 | 12.7 | 26,945 | 36.6 | +18.1 |
| Independent | 0 | Steady | 0.0 | 4 | 4 | 5.6 | 3,394 | 4.6 | -0.4 |
| Liberal Democrats | 0 | Steady | 0.0 | 0 | 0 | 0.0 | 1,840 | 2.5 | +0.8 |
| Green | 0 | Steady | 0.0 | 0 | 0 | 0.0 | 1,190 | 1.6 | -8.2 |
| Reform | 0 | Steady | 0.0 | 0 | 0 | 0.0 | 658 | 0.9 | New |
| TUSC | 0 | Steady | 0.0 | 0 | 0 | 0.0 | 229 | 0.3 | New |
| Workers Party | 0 | Steady | 0.0 | 0 | 0 | 0.0 | 92 | 0.1 | New |
| Women's Equality | 0 | Steady | 0.0 | 0 | 0 | 0.0 | 75 | 0.1 | New |
| For Britain | 0 | Steady | 0.0 | 0 | 0 | 0.0 | 72 | 0.1 | -1.8 |
| Yeshua | 0 | Steady | 0.0 | 0 | 0 | 0.0 | 37 | 0.1 | ±0.0 |

== Ward results ==
=== Abbey ===
Abbey
| Party | Candidate | Votes | % | ±% |
|---|---|---|---|---|
| Labour | Nicky Hinchliff | 2,197 | 68.44 | +13.6 |
| Conservative | Ali Hussain | 507 | 15.79 | +1.9 |
| Green | Barry Lim | 416 | 12.96 | −10.2 |
| Liberal Democrats | Robert Johns | 90 | 2.80 | −5.3 |
| Majority | | 1,690 | 52.65 | |
| Turnout | | 3,210 | 36.96 | |
| Labour hold | | Swing | | |

=== Blackheath ===
Blackheath
| Party | Candidate | Votes | % | ±% |
|---|---|---|---|---|
| Labour | Kerrie Carmichael | 1,402 | 56.7 | +23.3 |
| Conservative | Greg Allman | 1,072 | 43.3 | +14.8 |
| Majority | | | | |
| Turnout | | 2,505 | 26.8 | |
| Labour hold | | Swing | | |

=== Bristnall ===
Bristnall
| Party | Candidate | Votes | % | ±% |
|---|---|---|---|---|
| Labour | Ellen Fenton | 1,366 | 51.8 | +5.5 |
| Conservative | Connor Jones | 1,005 | 38.1 | +10.5 |
| Green | Joe Loudon | 158 | 6.0 | −20.0 |
| Liberal Democrats | Manjit Lall | 110 | 4.2 | New |
| Majority | | | | |
| Turnout | | 2,669 | 28.9 | |
| Labour hold | | Swing | | |

=== Charlemont with Grove Vale ===
Charlemont with Grove Vale
| Party | Candidate | Votes | % | ±% |
|---|---|---|---|---|
| Conservative | David Fisher | 1,814 | 54.0 | +23.3 |
| Labour | Liam Preece | 1,276 | 38.0 | −8.2 |
| Liberal Democrats | Amanda Jenkins | 92 | 2.7 | New |
| For Britain | Sam Harding | 72 | 2.1 | −3.7 |
| Reform | Graham Nock | 62 | 1.8 | New |
| Independent | Sanjeev Kumar | 43 | 1.3 | New |
| Majority | | | | |
| Turnout | | 3,409 | 35.9 | |
| Conservative gain from Labour | | Swing | | |

=== Cradley Heath and Old Hill ===
Cradley Heath and Old Hill
| Party | Candidate | Votes | % | ±% |
|---|---|---|---|---|
| Labour | Vicki Smith | 1,250 | 48.2 | −3.0 |
| Conservative | Satinder Dunn | 1,187 | 45.8 | +30.3 |
| Independent | Caroline White | 113 | 4.4 | New |
| TUSC | Cammilla Mngaza | 41 | 1.6 | New |
| Majority | | | | |
| Turnout | | 2,622 | 25.0 | |
| Labour hold | | Swing | | |

=== Friar Park ===
Friar Park
| Party | Candidate | Votes | % | ±% |
|---|---|---|---|---|
| Conservative | Scott Chapman | 1,008 | 51.6 | +36.0 |
| Labour | John Giles | 759 | 38.8 | −5.9 |
| Independent | Wayne Trinder | 151 | 7.7 | −27.3 |
| Yeshua | Colin Rankine | 37 | 1.9 | −2.8 |
| Majority | | | | |
| Turnout | | 1,971 | 21.8 | |
| Conservative gain from Labour | | Swing | | |

=== Great Barr with Yew Tree ===
Great Barr with Yew Tree
| Party | Candidate | Votes | % | ±% |
|---|---|---|---|---|
| Conservative | Liam Abrahams | 1,518 | 47.3 | +29.9 |
| Labour | Christopher Worsey | 1,172 | 36.6 | −10.4 |
| Liberal Democrats | Mark Smith | 269 | 8.4 | +3.0 |
| Independent | Darryl Magher | 247 | 7.7 | New |
| Majority | | | | |
| Turnout | | 3,230 | 32.2 | |
| Conservative gain from Labour | | Swing | | |

=== Great Bridge ===
Great Bridge
| Party | Candidate | Votes | % | ±% |
|---|---|---|---|---|
| Conservative | Will Gill | 1,099 | 47.7 | +20.5 |
| Labour | Ann Jarvis | 1,081 | 46.9 | −25.9 |
| Independent | Sandeep Singh | 123 | 5.3 | New |
| Majority | | | | |
| Turnout | | 2,326 | 23.5 | |
| Conservative gain from Labour | | Swing | | |

=== Greets Green and Lyng ===
Greets Green and Lyng
| Party | Candidate | Votes | % | ±% |
|---|---|---|---|---|
| Labour | Pam Randhawa | 1,679 | 56.8 | −17.1 |
| Conservative | Md Jalal Ahmed | 820 | 27.7 | +12.6 |
| Independent | John Edwards | 457 | 15.5 | New |
| Majority | | | | |
| Turnout | | 2,991 | 31.6 | |
| Labour hold | | Swing | | |

=== Hateley Heath ===
Hateley Heath
| Party | Candidate | Votes | % | ±% |
|---|---|---|---|---|
| Labour | Kacey Akpoteni | 1,471 | 50.3 | −25.3 |
| Conservative | Les Trumpeter | 1,277 | 43.6 | +19.2 |
| Reform | Jacqueline Nock | 112 | 3.8 | New |
| Independent | Paavan Ohm | 67 | 2.3 | New |
| Majority | | | | |
| Turnout | | 2,951 | 28.6 | |
| Labour hold | | Swing | | |

=== Langley ===
Langley
| Party | Candidate | Votes | % | ±% |
|---|---|---|---|---|
| Labour | Caroline Owen | 1,151 | 47.2 | −13.0 |
| Conservative | Mohammed Sakhi | 693 | 28.4 | +6.6 |
| Independent | Sharon Davies | 596 | 24.4 | New |
| Majority | | | | |
| Turnout | | 2,473 | 25.6 | |
| Labour hold | | Swing | | |

=== Newton ===
Newton
| Party | Candidate | Votes | % | ±% |
|---|---|---|---|---|
| Labour | Elaine Giles | 1,242 | 41.2 | +4.4 |
| Conservative | Lee Williams | 1,066 | 35.4 | +20.6 |
| Independent | Joyce Underhill | 452 | 15.0 | New |
| Liberal Democrats | Bertram Richards | 165 | 5.5 | −9.5 |
| Green | Hannah Valenzuela | 90 | 3.0 | −1.5 |
| Majority | | | | |
| Turnout | | 3,049 | 34.0 | |
| Labour hold | | Swing | | |

=== Old Warley ===
Old Warley
| Party | Candidate | Votes | % |
|---|---|---|---|
| Conservative | Jay Anandou | 1,361 | 44.3 |
| Labour | Harnoor Bhullar | 1,145 | 37.3 |
| Labour | John Tipper | 922 | 30.0 |
| Conservative | Jeffrey Regha | 859 | 28.0 |
| Green | Aldo Mussi | 267 | 8.7 |
| Liberal Democrats | Bob Smith | 236 | 7.7 |
| Reform | Karl Leech | 112 | 3.6 |
| Turnout | | 3,071 | 33.1 |
| Conservative gain from Labour | | | |
| Labour hold | | | |

=== Oldbury ===
Oldbury
| Party | Candidate | Votes | % | ±% |
|---|---|---|---|---|
| Labour | Rizwan Jalil | 2,075 | 64.0 | −8.9 |
| Conservative | Nathan Poole | 1,009 | 31.1 | +15.1 |
| TUSC | Richard Gingell | 157 | 4.8 | New |
| Majority | | | | |
| Turnout | | 3,278 | 31.6 | |
| Labour hold | | Swing | | |

=== Princes End ===
Princes End
| Party | Candidate | Votes | % | ±% |
|---|---|---|---|---|
| Conservative | Archer Williams | 909 | 48.7 | +28.8 |
| Labour | Susan Eaves | 590 | 31.6 | −7.8 |
| Reform | Bill Cherrington | 232 | 12.4 | New |
| Independent | Ian Jones | 134 | 7.2 | New |
| Majority | | | | |
| Turnout | | 1,882 | 19.8 | |
| Conservative gain from Labour | | Swing | | |

=== Rowley ===
Rowley
| Party | Candidate | Votes | % |
|---|---|---|---|
| Conservative | Laured Kalari | 1,050 | 42.0 |
| Conservative | Satpal Singh | 1,039 | 41.6 |
| Labour | Claire Mayo | 872 | 34.9 |
| Labour | Nagi Daya Singh | 865 | 34.6 |
| Turnout | | 2,498 | 25.4 |
| Conservative gain from Labour | | | |
| Conservative gain from Labour | | | |

=== Smethwick ===
Smethwick
| Party | Candidate | Votes | % | ±% |
|---|---|---|---|---|
| Labour | Parbinder Kaur | 2,066 | 69.0 | −3.4 |
| Conservative | Amrita Dunn | 559 | 18.7 | +5.3 |
| Liberal Democrats | Nicholas Bradley | 149 | 5.0 | New |
| Green | Rod Macrorie | 144 | 4.8 | −9.4 |
| Women's Equality | Serena Laidley | 75 | 2.5 | New |
| Majority | | | | |
| Turnout | | 3,044 | 30.8 | |
| Labour hold | | Swing | | |

=== Soho and Victoria ===
Soho and Victoria
| Party | Candidate | Votes | % | ±% |
|---|---|---|---|---|
| Labour | Farut Shaeen | 2,799 | 80.1 | −0.1 |
| Conservative | Steve Simcox | 444 | 12.7 | +3.3 |
| Liberal Democrats | Daisy Shone | 253 | 7.2 | New |
| Majority | | 2,355 | 67.4 | |
| Turnout | | 3,546 | 32.5 | |
| Labour hold | | Swing | | |

=== St. Paul's ===
St. Paul's
| Party | Candidate | Votes | % | ±% |
|---|---|---|---|---|
| Labour | Sukhbir Gill | 3,193 | 81.5 | −0.8 |
| Conservative | Keith Lawley | 570 | 14.5 | +4.9 |
| Liberal Democrats | Ian Jeavons | 157 | 4.0 | New |
| Majority | | | | |
| Turnout | | 3,961 | 37.4 | |
| Labour hold | | Swing | | |

=== Tipton Green ===
Tipton Green
| Party | Candidate | Votes | % | ±% |
|---|---|---|---|---|
| Labour | Charn Padda | 1,372 | 45.8 | −12.7 |
| Independent | Richard Jeffcoat | 1,011 | 33.7 | New |
| Conservative | Narinder Garcha | 613 | 20.5 | +2.4 |
| Majority | | | | |
| Turnout | | 3,022 | 27.6 | |
| Labour hold | | Swing | | |

=== Tividale ===
Tividale
| Party | Candidate | Votes | % | ±% |
|---|---|---|---|---|
| Labour | Maria Crompton | 1,323 | 53.0 | −1.3 |
| Conservative | Emma Henlan | 1,173 | 47.0 | +23.9 |
| Majority | | 150 | 6.0 | |
| Turnout | | 2,521 | 27.0 | |
| Labour hold | | Swing | | |

=== Wednesbury North ===
Wednesbury North
| Party | Candidate | Votes | % | ±% |
|---|---|---|---|---|
| Labour Co-op | Peter Hughes | 1,259 | 51.12 | |
| Conservative | Sarah Johnson | 1,058 | 42.96 | |
| Green | Mark Redding | 115 | 4.67 | |
| TUSC | Gareth Knox | 31 | 1.26 | |
| Majority | | 201 | 8.16 | |
| Turnout | | 2,463 | 26.6 | |
| Labour Co-op hold | | Swing | | |

=== Wednesbury South ===
Wednesbury South
| Party | Candidate | Votes | % |
|---|---|---|---|
| Labour | Kirat Singh | 1,578 | 49.5 |
| Conservative | Ian Chambers | 1,137 | 35.7 |
| Labour | Gulshan Tabassum | 1,032 | 32.4 |
| Conservative | David Wilkes | 970 | 30.4 |
| Reform | Steve Dabbs | 140 | 4.4 |
| Workers Party | Reuben Lawrence | 92 | 2.9 |
| Turnout | | 3,187 | 30.9 |
| Labour hold | | | |
| Conservative gain from Labour | | | |

=== West Bromwich Central ===
West Bromwich Central
| Party | Candidate | Votes | % | ±% |
|---|---|---|---|---|
| Labour | Laura Rollins | 1,916 | 56.97 | ▼14.3 |
| Conservative | Fajli Bibi | 1,128 | 33.54 | ▲14.8 |
| Liberal Democrats | Daljit Kaur Nagra | 319 | 9.5 | N/A |
| Majority | | | | |
| Turnout | | 3,363 | 32.32 | |
| Labour hold | | Swing | | |

== By-elections ==
=== Tividale ===
Tividale: 15 July 2021
| Party | Candidate | Votes | % | ±% |
|---|---|---|---|---|
| Conservative | Emma Henlan | 986 | 52.6 | +20.7 |
| Labour | Robert Hevican | 810 | 43.2 | −13.7 |
| Independent | Energy Kutebura | 40 | 2.1 | New |
| Liberal Democrats | Nicholas Bradley | 30 | 1.6 | New |
| TUSC | Richard Gingell | 9 | 0.5 | New |
| Majority | | 176 | 9.4 | N/A |
| Turnout | | 1,878 | 20.1 | |
| Conservative gain from Labour | | Swing | ▲17.2 | |
