= 2018 Sandwell Metropolitan Borough Council election =

2018 UK local government election

Map showing the results of the 2018 Sandwell Metropolitan Borough Council election

The 2018 Sandwell Metropolitan Borough Council election took place on 3 May 2018 to elect members of Sandwell Metropolitan Borough Council in England. This was on the same day as other local elections.

== Results summary ==
2018 Sandwell Metropolitan Borough Council election
Party	This election			Full council			This election		
Party	Seats	Net	Seats %	Other	Total	Total %	Votes	Votes %	+/−
Labour	24	Steady	100.0	48	72	100.0	43,922	68.5	
Conservative	0	Steady	0.0	0	0	0.0	15,625	24.4	
Green	0	Steady	0.0	0	0	0.0	2,970	4.6	
For Britain	0	Steady	0.0	0	0	0.0	649	1.0	
Independent	0	Steady	0.0	0	0	0.0	511	0.8	
Liberal Democrats	0	Steady	0.0	0	0	0.0	276	0.4	
UKIP	0	Steady	0.0	0	0	0.0	115	0.2	
Yeshua	0	Steady	0.0	0	0	0.0	74	0.1	

== Ward results ==
=== Abbey ===
Abbey
Party	Candidate	Votes	%	±%
Labour	Bob Piper	2,223	73.5	
Conservative	Richard Kemp	411	13.6	
Green	Michael Allen	391	12.9	
Majority		1,812	59.9	
Turnout		3,025	37.3	
Labour hold		Swing		

=== Blackheath ===
Blackheath
Party	Candidate	Votes	%	±%
Labour	Danny Millard	1,079	49.9	
Conservative	Bob Dunn	984	45.5	
Green	Aldo Mussi	100	4.6	
Majority		95	4.4	
Turnout		2,163	23.9	
Labour hold		Swing		

=== Bristnall ===
Bristnall
Party	Candidate	Votes	%	±%
Labour	Rajbir Singh	1,342	56.4	
Conservative	Shirley Ching	696	29.3	
Green	John Macefield	341	14.3	
Majority		646	27.2	
Turnout		2,379	27.1	
Labour hold		Swing		

=== Charlemont with Grove Vale ===
Charlemont with Grove Vale
Party	Candidate	Votes	%	±%
Labour	Sue Phillips	1,335	51.1	
Conservative	Lee Williams	1,027	39.3	
For Britain	Sam Harding	135	5.2	
UKIP	Graham Nock	115	4.4	
Majority		308	11.8	
Turnout		2,612	28.9	
Labour hold		Swing		

=== Cradley Heath and Old Hill ===
Cradley Heath and Old Hill
Party	Candidate	Votes	%	±%
Labour	Julie Webb	1,380	59.0	
Conservative	Balhar Singh	698	29.8	
Green	Paul Conner	168	7.2	
Liberal Democrats	Robert Johns	93	4.0	
Majority		682	29.2	
Turnout		2,339	23.7	
Labour hold		Swing		

=== Friar Park ===
Friar Park
Party	Candidate	Votes	%	±%
Labour	Simon Hackett	1,445	77.3	
Conservative	Keith Lawley	351	18.8	
Yeshua	Colin Rankine	74	4.0	
Majority		1,094	58.5	
Turnout		1,870	21.9	
Labour hold		Swing		

=== Great Barr with Yew Tree ===
Great Barr with Yew Tree
Party	Candidate	Votes	%	±%
Labour	Steve Melia	1,700	58.3	
Conservative	Suki Nandra	641	22.0	
For Britain	Darryl Magher	258	8.8	
Independent	David Fisher	244	8.4	
Green	Daniel Waugh Hroncovà	73	2.5	
Majority		1,059	36.3	
Turnout		2,916	30.8	
Labour hold		Swing		

=== Great Bridge ===
Great Bridge
Party	Candidate	Votes	%	±%
Labour	Joanne Hadley	1,229	67.7	
Conservative	Stuart Bate	586	32.3	
Majority		643	35.4	
Turnout		1,815	19.8	
Labour hold		Swing		

=== Greets Green and Lyng ===
Greets Green and Lyng (2)
Party	Candidate	Votes	%	±%
Labour	Iqbal Padda	1,951	75.6	
Labour	Jackie Taylor	1,673	64.8	
Conservative	Elizabeth Brown	500	19.4	
Conservative	Judith Willetts	336	13.0	
Green	Frederic Lacroix	149	5.8	
Majority		278	10.8	
Turnout		2,580	30.6	
Labour hold		Swing		
Labour gain from Vacant		Swing		

=== Hateley Heath ===
Hateley Heath
Party	Candidate	Votes	%	±%
Labour	Paul Moore	1,932	79.2	
Conservative	Paul Kearns	506	20.8	
Majority		1,426	58.5	
Turnout		2,438	26.1	
Labour hold		Swing		

=== Langley ===
Langley
Party	Candidate	Votes	%	±%
Labour	Bill Gavan	1,394	65.6	
Conservative	Stephen Gilbert	570	26.8	
Green	Robert Taberner	161	7.6	
Majority		824	38.8	
Turnout		2,125	23.8	
Labour hold		Swing		

=== Newton ===
Newton
Party	Candidate	Votes	%	±%
Labour	Keith Allcock	1,581	63.1	
Conservative	Robert Willetts	667	26.6	
For Britain	Steve Latham	256	10.2	
Majority		914	36.5	
Turnout		2,504	29.5	
Labour hold		Swing		

=== Old Warley ===
Old Warley
Party	Candidate	Votes	%	±%
Labour	Steve Trow	1,521	60.5	
Conservative	John McHard	810	32.2	
Liberal Democrats	Bryan Manley-Green	183	7.3	
Majority		711	28.3	
Turnout		2,514	27.9	
Labour hold		Swing		

=== Oldbury ===
Oldbury
Party	Candidate	Votes	%	±%
Labour	Mushtaq Hussain	1,908	68.3	
Conservative	Keith Vaughan	662	23.7	
Green	Jody Waugh	224	8.0	
Majority		1,246	44.6	
Turnout		2,794	30.5	
Labour hold		Swing		

=== Princes End ===
Princes End
Party	Candidate	Votes	%	±%
Labour	Jenny Chidley	733	48.8	
Conservative	Steve Simcox	503	33.5	
Independent	James Marsh	267	17.8	
Majority		230	15.3	
Turnout		1,503	16.7	
Labour hold		Swing		

=== Rowley ===
Rowley
Party	Candidate	Votes	%	±%
Labour	Cristopher Tranter	1,193	59.1	
Conservative	Satpal Singh	663	32.8	
Green	Susan O'Dell	163	8.1	
Majority		530	26.3	
Turnout		2,019	22.2	
Labour hold		Swing		

=== Smethwick ===
Smethwick
Party	Candidate	Votes	%	±%
Labour	Wasim Ali	2,095	71.6	
Conservative	Colin Clark	562	19.2	
Green	Stephanie Buckman	271	9.3	
Majority		1,533	52.4	
Turnout		2,928	31.9	
Labour hold		Swing		

=== Soho and Victoria ===
Soho and Victoria
Party	Candidate	Votes	%	±%
Labour	Mohammad Rouf	2,889	83.0	
Conservative	Daniel Mathias	352	10.1	
Green	Robert Buckman	241	6.9	
Majority		2,537	72.9	
Turnout		3,482	37.2	
Labour hold		Swing		

=== St Paul's ===
St Paul's (2)
Party	Candidate	Votes	%	±%
Labour	Samiya Akhter	2,682	72.4	
Labour	Babu Bawa	2,580	69.7	
Conservative	Mohammad Hussain	550	14.6	
Conservative	Narinder Garcha	526	14.2	
Green	Fabienne Ottridge	166	4.5	
Majority		102	2.8	
Turnout		3,702	38.7	
Labour hold		Swing		
Labour gain from Vacant		Swing		

=== Tipton Green ===
Tipton Green
Party	Candidate	Votes	%	±%
Labour	Mohammed Hussain	1,858	68.2	
Conservative	Donald Griffiths	867	31.8	
Majority		991	36.4	
Turnout		2,725	27.4	
Labour hold		Swing		

=== Tividale ===
Tividale
Party	Candidate	Votes	%	±%
Labour	Sandra Hevican	1,137	56.9	
Conservative	John Stockall	637	31.9	
Green	Keir Williams	226	11.3	
Majority		500 <!exactly>	25.0	
Turnout		2,000 <!exactly>	22.3	
Labour hold		Swing		

=== Wednesbury North ===
Wednesbury North
Party	Candidate	Votes	%	±%
Labour	Luke Giles	1,372	63.8	
Conservative	Scott Chapman	657	30.6	
Green	Mark Redding	120	5.6	
Majority		715	33.3	
Turnout		2,149	23.9	
Labour hold		Swing		

=== Wednesbury South ===
Wednesbury South
Party	Candidate	Votes	%	±%
Labour	Bob Lloyd	1,566	66.0	
Conservative	Michael Middleton	807	34.0	
Majority		759	32.0	
Turnout		2,373	24.5	
Labour hold		Swing		

=== West Bromwich Central ===
West Bromwich Central
Party	Candidate	Votes	%	±%
Labour	Mohinder Singh Tagger	2,124	72.6	
Conservative	Pauline Williams	626	21.4	
Green	Ryan Ottridge	176	6.0	
Majority		1,498	51.2	
Turnout		2,926	30.9	
Labour hold		Swing		
