= List of schools in Sandwell =

This is a list of schools in Sandwell, West Midlands, England.

== State-funded schools ==
=== Primary schools ===
- Abbey Infant School, Smethwick
- Abbey Junior School, Smethwick
- Albert Pritchard Infant School, Wednesbury
- All Saints CE Primary School, West Bromwich
- Annie Lennard Primary School, Smethwick
- Bearwood Primary School, Smethwick
- Blackheath Primary School, Rowley Regis
- Bleakhouse Primary School, Oldbury
- Brandhall Primary School, Oldbury
- Brickhouse Primary School, Rowley Regis
- Burnt Tree Primary School, Tividale
- Cape Primary School, Smethwick
- Causeway Green Primary School, Oldbury
- Christ Church CE Primary School, Oldbury
- Corngreaves Academy, Cradley Heath
- Crocketts Community Primary School, Smethwick
- Devonshire Infant Academy, Smethwick
- Devonshire Junior Academy, Smethwick
- Eaton Valley Primary School, West Bromwich
- Ferndale Primary School, Great Barr
- Galton Valley Primary School, Smethwick
- George Betts Primary Academy, Smethwick
- Glebefields Primary School, Tipton
- Grace Mary Primary School, Tividale
- Great Bridge Primary School, Great Bridge
- Grove Vale Primary School, Great Barr
- Hall Green Primary School, West Bromwich
- Hamstead Primary School, Great Barr
- Hanbury Primary School, West Bromwich
- Hargate Primary School, West Bromwich
- Harvills Hawthorn Primary School, West Bromwich
- Hateley Heath Academy, West Bromwich
- Highfields Primary School, Rowley Regis
- Holy Name RC Primary School, Great Barr
- Holy Trinity CE Primary School, West Bromwich
- Holyhead Primary Academy, Wednesbury
- Joseph Turner Primary School, Tipton
- Jubilee Park Academy, Tipton
- King George V Primary School, West Bromwich
- Langley Primary School, Oldbury
- Lightwoods Primary Academy, Oldbury
- Lodge Primary School, West Bromwich
- Lyng Primary School, West Bromwich
- Mesty Croft Primary, Wednesbury
- Moat Farm Infant School, Oldbury
- Moat Farm Junior School, Oldbury
- Moorlands Primary School, West Bromwich
- Newtown Primary School, West Bromwich
- Oakham Primary School, Tividale
- Ocker Hill Academy, Tipton
- Ocker Hill Infant School, Tipton
- Old Hill Primary School, Cradley Heath
- Old Park Primary School, Wednesbury
- Our Lady & St Hubert's RC Primary School, Oldbury
- Park Hill Primary School, Wednesbury
- Pennyhill Primary School, West Bromwich
- Perryfields Primary School, Oldbury
- The Priory Primary School, Friar Park
- Reddal Hill Primary School, Cradley Heath
- Rood End Primary School, Oldbury
- Rounds Green Primary School, Oldbury
- Rowley Hall Primary School, Rowley Regis
- Ryders Green Primary School, West Bromwich
- Sacred Heart Primary School, Tipton
- St Francis Xavier RC Primary School, Oldbury
- St Gregory's RC Primary School, Smethwick
- St James CE Primary School, Oldbury
- St John Bosco RC Primary School, West Bromwich
- St John's CE Primary Academy, Wednesbury
- St Margaret's CE Primary School, Great Barr
- St Martin's CE Primary School, Tipton
- St Mary Magdalene CE Primary School, West Bromwich
- St Mary's RC Primary School, Wednesbury
- St Matthew's CE Primary School, Smethwick
- St Paul's CE Primary School, Tipton
- St Philip's RC Primary School, Smethwick
- Shireland Hall Primary Academy, Smethwick
- Shireland Technology Primary School, Smethwick
- Silvertrees Academy, Tipton
- Springfield Primary School, Rowley Regis
- Summerhill Primary Academy, Tipton
- Tameside Primary Academy, Wednesbury
- Temple Meadow Primary School, Cradley Heath
- Timbertree Academy, Cradley Heath
- Tipton Green Junior School, Tipton
- Tividale Community Primary School, Tividale
- Tividale Hall Primary School, Tividale
- Uplands Manor Primary School, Smethwick
- Victoria Park Academy, Smethwick
- Wednesbury Oak Primary School, Tipton
- Whitecrest Primary School, Great Barr
- Wood Green Junior School, Wednesbury
- Yew Tree Primary School, Yew Tree

=== Secondary schools ===
- Bristnall Hall Academy, Oldbury
- George Salter Academy, West Bromwich
- Gospel Oak School, Tipton
- Health Futures UTC, West Bromwich
- Holly Lodge High School, Smethwick
- Oldbury Academy, Oldbury
- Ormiston Forge Academy, Cradley Heath
- Ormiston Sandwell Community Academy, Oldbury
- Perryfields Academy, Oldbury
- The Phoenix Collegiate, West Bromwich
- Q3 Academy Great Barr, Great Barr
- Q3 Academy Langley, Oldbury
- Q3 Academy Tipton, Tipton
- St Michael's Church of England High School, Rowley Regis
- Sandwell Academy, West Bromwich
- Shireland CBSO Academy, West Bromwich
- Shireland Collegiate Academy, Smethwick
- Stuart Bathurst Catholic High School, Wednesbury
- West Bromwich Collegiate Academy, West Bromwich
- Windsor Olympus Academy, Birmingham*
- Wodensborough Ormiston Academy, Wednesbury
- Wood Green Academy, Wednesbury

*This school is located in Birmingham, but is for pupils from Sandwell

=== Special and alternative schools ===
- Albright Education Centre, Tipton
- Elm Tree Primary Academy, West Bromwich
- High Point Academy, Wednesbury
- The Meadows School, Oldbury
- The Orchard School, Oldbury
- The Primrose Centre, Rowley Regis
- Sandwell Community School, West Bromwich
- Shenstone Lodge School, Shenstone, Staffordshire*
- The Westminster School, Rowley Regis

*This school is located in Staffordshire, but is for pupils from Sandwell

=== Further education ===
- Sandwell College

== Independent schools ==
=== Primary and preparatory schools ===
- Al Khair School, Oldbury

=== Senior and all-through schools ===
- The British Muslim School, West Bromwich

=== Special and alternative schools ===
- Compass Community School Victoria Park, Tipton
- Dudley Port School, Tipton
- Sandwell Valley School, West Bromwich

== See also ==
- Defunct schools in Sandwell
