= 2008 Sandwell Metropolitan Borough Council election =

2008 UK local government election

Map of the results of the 2008 Sandwell council election. Labour in red, Conservatives in blue and Liberal Democrats in yellow.

The 2008 Sandwell Metropolitan Borough Council election took place on 1 May 2008 to elect members of Sandwell Metropolitan Borough Council in the West Midlands, England. One third of the council was up for election and the Labour Party stayed in overall control of the council.

After the election, the composition of the council was:

- Labour 49
- Conservative 14
- Liberal Democrat 5
- British National Party 2
- Independent 2

== Background ==
Before the election Labour ran the council with 52 of the 72 seats, compared to 11 for the Conservatives, 5 Liberal Democrats, 2 British National Party and 2 independents. This meant the Conservatives could not gain control of the council whatever the results, despite Labour defending 17 of the 24 seats being contested. Other candidates in the election included 12 from the British National Party, 7 from the Green Party and 1 Socialist Labour Party candidate in Oldbury ward.

== Election result ==
The results saw Labour remain in control of the council with 49 seats, but the Conservatives made a net gain of 3 to move to 14 seats. The Conservatives gained 4 of the 17 seats Labour had been defending, in the wards of Bristnall, Cradley Heath and Old Hill, Princes End and Wednesbury South. However Labour did take 1 seat back from the Conservatives in St Pauls ward. Labour put the results down to them keeping council tax levels low and improving services, however the Conservatives said they were moving forward in "a traditional Labour stronghold".

The Liberal Democrats held the 2 seats they had been defending in Great Barr with Yew Tree and Newton wards to stay on 5 seats, while neither the Greens or the British National Party won any seats. The British National Party share of the vote in the 12 seats they contested, dropped to 17% from the 33% they had won in the 2006 election.

Sandwell local election result 2008
Party	Seats	Gains	Losses	Net gain/loss	Seats %	Votes %	Votes	+/−
Labour	14	1	4	-3	58.3	43.8	30,195	-1.3%
Conservative	8	4	1	+3	33.3	36.1	24,881	+8.8%
Liberal Democrats	2	0	0	0	8.3	9.8	6,780	-1.4%
BNP	0	0	0	0	0	8.4	5,755	-6.8%
Green	0	0	0	0	0	1.5	1,006	+0.8%
Socialist Labour	0	0	0	0	0	0.3	216	+0.3%
Independent	0	0	0	0	0	0.1	84	-0.4%

== Ward results ==
Abbey
Party	Candidate	Votes	%	±%
Labour	Ann Gieszcykiewicz-Jaron	1,571	51.7	−2.8
Conservative	Ewart Johnson	916	30.2	+8.7
Liberal Democrats	David Nikel	342	11.3	−12.7
Green	Patricia Thompson	209	6.9	+6.9
Majority		655	21.6	−8.8
Turnout		3,038		
Labour hold		Swing		

Blackheath
Party	Candidate	Votes	%	±%
Conservative	Mary Docker	1,497	54.0	+21.2
Labour	Robert Hamblett	1,016	36.7	−6.1
Liberal Democrats	Robert Johns	258	9.3	+9.3
Majority		481	17.3	
Turnout		2,771		
Conservative hold		Swing		

Bristnall
Party	Candidate	Votes	%	±%
Conservative	Terence Grainger	1,306	46.7	+5.4
Labour	Malcolm Bridges	1,235	44.1	−1.1
Liberal Democrats	Emma Underhill	258	9.2	−4.3
Majority		71	2.6	
Turnout		2,799		
Conservative gain from Labour		Swing		

Charlemont with Grove Vale
Party	Candidate	Votes	%	±%
Conservative	Raymond Nock	1,635	48.3	+10.8
Labour	Ralph Perkins	664	19.6	−5.3
BNP	Arthur Copson	571	16.9	−3.4
Liberal Democrats	Michaela Allcock	362	10.7	−6.6
Green	John Macefield	155	4.6	+4.6
Majority		971	28.7	+16.1
Turnout		3,387		
Conservative hold		Swing		

Cradley Heath and Old Hill
Party	Candidate	Votes	%	±%
Conservative	Elizabeth Bowler	1,430	53.9	+23.8
Labour	Margaret James	1,224	46.1	+1.0
Majority		206	7.8	
Turnout		2,654		
Conservative gain from Labour		Swing		

Friar Park
Party	Candidate	Votes	%	±%
Labour	Geoffrey Lewis	1,027	44.9	+3.2
Conservative	Thomas Nelson	691	30.2	+8.1
BNP	Gordon Howells	427	18.7	−12.3
Liberal Democrats	Dorothy Brayshaw	140	6.1	+0.9
Majority		336	14.7	+4.0
Turnout		2,285		
Labour hold		Swing		

Great Barr with Yew Tree
Party	Candidate	Votes	%	±%
Liberal Democrats	Sadie Smith	1,218	36.0	+3.5
Labour	Roy Melia	905	26.7	+1.0
Conservative	Robert White	715	21.1	+1.0
BNP	Terence Lewin	547	16.2	−5.5
Majority		313	9.2	+2.4
Turnout		3,385		
Liberal Democrats hold		Swing		

Great Bridge
Party	Candidate	Votes	%	±%
Labour	Derek Rowley	1,220	45.0	−0.3
BNP	Jennifer Howells	711	26.2	−3.9
Conservative	Heather Gibson	629	23.2	+6.3
Liberal Democrats	Nigel Richards	154	5.7	+2.4
Majority		509	18.8	+3.6
Turnout		2,714		
Labour hold		Swing		

Greets Green and Lyng
Party	Candidate	Votes	%	±%
Labour	John Edwards	1,259	51.3	+3.8
Conservative	Elaine Fitzpatrick	592	24.1	+3.8
BNP	David Howells	422	17.2	−7.8
Liberal Democrats	Dorothy Jones	180	7.3	+0.2
Majority		667	27.2	+4.8
Turnout		2,453		
Labour hold		Swing		

Hateley Heath
Party	Candidate	Votes	%	±%
Labour	Paul Sandars	1,245	45.9	−2.8
Conservative	Stephanie Page	706	26.0	+12.4
BNP	James Vaughan	512	18.9	−10.6
Liberal Democrats	Martin Roebuck	250	9.2	+0.9
Majority		539	19.9	+0.7
Turnout		2,713		
Labour hold		Swing		

Langley
Party	Candidate	Votes	%	±%
Labour	Pauline Hinton	1,271	47.6	+0.3
Conservative	Ronald Griffiths	897	33.6	+9.9
BNP	Victoria Montgomery	364	13.6	−8.1
Liberal Democrats	Ronald Hackett	137	5.1	−2.3
Majority		374	14.0	−9.6
Turnout		2,669		
Labour hold		Swing		

Newton
Party	Candidate	Votes	%	±%
Liberal Democrats	Joyce Underhill	1,310	45.4	+3.1
Conservative	Valerie Ward	763	26.4	+3.0
Labour	Shirley Hosell	719	24.9	−9.4
Green	David Hawkins	94	3.3	+3.3
Majority		547	19.0	+11.0
Turnout		2,886		
Liberal Democrats hold		Swing		

Old Warley
Party	Candidate	Votes	%	±%
Conservative	Leslie Pawlowski	1,494	45.6	+4.8
Labour	Susan Crumpton	1,269	38.8	−7.0
Liberal Democrats	Baden Smith	359	11.0	−2.4
Green	Aldo Mussi	151	4.6	+4.6
Majority		225	6.8	
Turnout		3,273		
Conservative hold		Swing		

Oldbury
Party	Candidate	Votes	%	±%
Labour	Susan Downing	1,720	51.0	−13.4
Conservative	Abdul Qayyum	1,173	34.8	−0.8
Liberal Democrats	Richard Mitchener	265	7.9	+7.9
Socialist Labour	Maureen Matthews	216	6.4	+6.4
Majority		547	16.2	−12.6
Turnout		3,374		
Labour hold		Swing		

Princes End
Party	Candidate	Votes	%	±%
Conservative	Beatrice Owen	974	46.0	+26.2
Labour	Delia Edwards	718	33.9	−1.8
BNP	Karen Parkes	427	20.2	−14.7
Majority		256	12.1	
Turnout		2,119		
Conservative gain from Labour		Swing		

Rowley
Party	Candidate	Votes	%	±%
Labour	Iris Boucher	1,169	45.5	−6.6
Conservative	Wayne Nicholas	896	34.9	+8.7
BNP	John Salvage	384	15.0	−1.9
Green	Vicky Dunn	118	4.6	−0.3
Majority		273	10.6	−15.3
Turnout		2,567		
Labour hold		Swing		

St Paul's
Party	Candidate	Votes	%	±%
Labour	Paramjit Randhawa	2,031	52.6	−8.2
Conservative	Mohammed Sakhi	1,497	38.8	−0.4
Liberal Democrats	Thomas Underhill	249	6.4	+6.4
Independent	Roshan Randhawa	84	2.2	+2.2
Majority		534	13.8	−7.8
Turnout		3,861		
Labour gain from Conservative		Swing		

Smethwick
Party	Candidate	Votes	%	±%
Labour	Linda Horton	1,620	59.0	+5.4
Conservative	William Shipman	758	27.6	+0.7
Liberal Democrats	Roger Prior	369	13.4	−6.1
Majority		862	31.4	+4.8
Turnout		2,747		
Labour hold		Swing		

Soho and Victoria
Party	Candidate	Votes	%	±%
Labour	Darren Cooper	1,972	70.9	+15.3
Liberal Democrats	Kezia Malton	441	15.9	−16.3
Conservative	Robert Lawrence	367	13.2	+3.2
Majority		1,531	55.1	+31.7
Turnout		2,780		
Labour hold		Swing		

Tipton Green
Party	Candidate	Votes	%	±%
Labour	Ian Jones	1,373	47.7	+0.6
Conservative	Sandra Vickers	684	23.8	+7.4
BNP	Keith Woodhouse	532	18.5	−10.4
Liberal Democrats	Joanne Arnold	289	10.0	+2.5
Majority		689	23.9	+5.7
Turnout		2,878		
Labour hold		Swing		

Tividale
Party	Candidate	Votes	%	±%
Labour	Maria Crompton	1,485	56.3	+14.7
Conservative	Jack Sabharwal	1,155	43.8	+25.8
Majority		330	12.5	+0.7
Turnout		2,640		
Labour hold		Swing		

Wednesbury North
Party	Candidate	Votes	%	±%
Conservative	William Archer	2,115	79.3	+23.4
Labour	Babubhai Patel	553	20.7	−5.3
Majority		1,562	58.5	+28.6
Turnout		2,668		
Conservative hold		Swing		

Wednesbury South
Party	Candidate	Votes	%	±%
Conservative	Michael Middleton	1,215	40.8	+11.1
Labour	Robert Evans	1,144	38.4	−2.3
BNP	Lee Bissell	467	15.7	−8.1
Green	Colin Bye	151	5.1	+5.1
Majority		71	2.4	
Turnout		2,977		
Conservative gain from Labour		Swing		

West Bromwich Central
Party	Candidate	Votes	%	±%
Labour	Kim Wilkinson	1,785	54.4	−0.9
Conservative	Margaret Macklin	776	23.7	−7.3
BNP	John Howells	391	11.9	+11.9
Liberal Democrats	Russell George	199	6.1	−7.6
Green	Brian Thompson	128	3.9	+3.9
Majority		1,009	30.8	+6.5
Turnout		3,279		
Labour hold		Swing		
