= Municipal Buildings, Oldbury =

Municipal building in Oldbury, West Midlands, England

- Municipal Buildings, Oldbury, in 2026

- Shown in the West Midlands
- 52.5042°N 2.0169°W
- Location: Halesowen Street, Oldbury

History
- Built: 1891

Site notes
- Architect(s): Wood and Kendrick
- Architectural style: Renaissance style

The Municipal Buildings are in Oldbury town centre, West Midlands, England. The structure served as the headquarters of Oldbury Borough Council.

== History ==
In the late 1880s the local board of health decided to procure municipal buildings for the town. The chosen site, on the corner of Halesowen and Freeth Street, adjoined an existing public hall (Note: The old hall had been built in 1863 as the Temperance Hall, later becoming the People's Hall and, by the late 19th century, it became the Town Hall. It was demolished in the 1980s to make way for a retail development.) and was next to the site previously occupied by the old chapel of St Nicholas which, after having become very dilapidated, had been demolished.

The new building was designed by Wood and Kendrick of West Bromwich in the Renaissance style, built by John Dallow and Sons of Blackheath in brick with terracotta facings and was officially opened as "the Public Buildings" in 1891. The design involved an asymmetrical main frontage with five bays facing onto Freeth Street; the second bay from the left featured an arched doorway flanked by pilasters supporting an entablature. The other bays contained mullioned windows on the ground floor and round headed windows on the first floor. At roof level the second and fourth bays featured shaped gables containing small mullioned windows. The building also featured a prominent tower at its southeast corner with a clock, octagonal cupola and spire. The clock was designed and manufactured by Clement Pass of Oldbury. The principal rooms were the council chamber in the tower corner on the first floor and the public library on the ground floor. The public offices were accessed from Freeth Street whilst the public library had a separate entrance in Halesowen Street.

Following population growth, largely associated with the local railway carriage works and iron manufacturing, the area became an urban district with the municipal buildings as its headquarters in 1894. A war memorial, to commemorate the lives of local service personnel who had died in the First World War was established outside the town hall. It initially took the form of a Mark IV tank which had been manufactured by Oldbury Carriage Works and donated by the War Office. A permanent war memorial, in the form of a cenotaph, was erected by John Dallow and Sons and unveiled by General Sir Ian Hamilton on 4 November 1926. The council was advanced to the status of municipal borough with the municipal buildings as its headquarters in 1935.

The municipal offices continued to serve as the headquarters of the borough for much of the 20th century but ceased to be the local seat of government when the new Warley County Borough was formed at Smethwick Council House in 1966. Sandwell Metropolitan Borough Council, which was formed in 1974, was initially based at West Bromwich Town Hall but moved to modern facilities at the new Sandwell Council House on the east side of Freeth Street, Oldbury in 1989. The municipal buildings in Oldbury went on to serve as the local offices of Citizens Advice.
