= Q3 Academy Langley =

Location
- Matty Lane; Langley; Oldbury, West Midlands, B68 8ED; England; 52.4858°N 2.0017°W

Information
- Type: Academy
- Motto: To seek for that which is good,that which is right and that which is true
- Local authority: Sandwell
- Trust: The Mercian Trust
- Department for Education URN: 141698 Tables
- Ofsted: Reports
- Head of School: Mr P Lee
- Gender: Coeducational
- Age: 11 to 19
- Website: http://www.q3langley.org.uk/

Q3 Academy Langley is a coeducational secondary school located in the Langley Green area of Oldbury in the West Midlands of England.

== History ==
=== Grammar school ===
Oldbury County High School (a grammar school) opened in 1926, on Moat Road across from Barnford Hill Park in Langley Green. This was after the transfer of Oldbury Secondary School, founded in 1904, from Flash Road, Oldbury. In 1944, following the new Education Act, the County High, originally co-opting its location within Worcestershire, became Oldbury Grammar School.

In 1929, local glass artists Tom Stokes and Bill Pardoe created a window for Oldbury Grammar's main school hall as a memorial to the Old Boys of the school who died in the 1914-18 First World War. It consists of eight lights with the allegorical figures of Justice, Courage and Fortitude and with extracts from the story of the Peloponnesian War, specially selected by Mr Willis Bond, that great figure in Worcestershire education of those days. Around the same time, money was raised for a multi-pipe church-style organ. "I Vow To Thee My Country" became a regular fixture of morning assembly.

The school motto was Cresco ("I Grow"). Former grammar school pupils are known as "Old Cresconians".

Serving a mainly working class area, the school acted as a bridge to University education and a career in the professions. A thriving sixth form, lost when the school changed to a comprehensive in 1974, saw many pupils attain sufficient quality A-levels (Advanced levels) to attend major British universities and gain social mobility.

A history of Oldbury Grammar School from 1904 to 1974 was written by former history teacher at the school Mr A.A.L Pearce and published in 1979. "Farewell to Oldbury Grammar School", a poem written to commemorate the last grammar school intake to leave the school in the summer of 1978, appeared in The Blackcountryman, the quarterly publication of The Black Country Society.

As a selective grammar with open entry dictated only by academic ability at 11+ rather than the ability to afford school fees, the school not only promoted similar levels of academic excellence to that of private schools but adopted many of their trappings including a House system (Queens; Kings; Trinity; School), winter and summer school uniform (which included distinctive green, blue and white striped blazers and straw boater hats for girls), the teaching of Latin and a school song which drew on the working-class roots of the area.

=== Comprehensive school ===
The school became a non-selective 11–16 comprehensive school in September 1977 when many of the former Grammar School teaching staff retired or left for posts in other schools and pupils seeking A-level education left to continue education at new Sixth Form Colleges established at the premises of the former Holly Lodge Grammar School for Boys (renamed West Park College) in Smethwick and Rowley Regis Grammar School in Rowley Regis. On becoming a comprehensive, the school marked the move away from selective intakes with a name change to Oldbury High School and a smaller, more localised, catchment area. The name change coincided with the Warley (which included the school and Oldbury, Smethwick and Rowley Regis) and West Bromwich county boroughs merging to become known as Sandwell. Oldbury High School merged with comprehensive Albright High School in September 1983 to become Langley High School.

Plans were announced in 2006 to merge Langley High with nearby Bristnall Hall Technology College. These plans coincided with the school finishing lowest of 18 secondary schools in Sandwell, when a mere 16% of GCSE students attained five or more 'A' to 'C' grades compared to 95%+ of pupils gaining five or more 'O' Levels at grades 1–5 (A-C) when the school held Grammar status and a majority successfully passing eight 'O' Levels.

However, the school later merged with nearby Warley High School (Oldbury Tech), becoming Oldbury College of Sport. It was announced that Bristnall Hall Technology College (formerly Bristnall Hall Secondary School and now Bristnall Hall Academy) was to be rebuilt on the Moat Road site, with the relocation expected to take place during the early 2010s. Oldbury College of Sport was renamed Oldbury Academy in 2011, with the school moving all activity to the former Oldbury Technical School site on Pound Road and abandoning the Grammar School site in Moat Road.

=== Q3 Academy Langley ===
Sandwell Council issued a prospectus with a view to an educational trust reopening the former Langley High School site as a new school. The original school building was destroyed in 2015, when work began on redeveloping the site.

Q3 Academy Langley opened in new buildings on the site in September 2016. It is an academy sponsored by the Q3 Multi Academies Trust.

== The school today ==
Q3 Academy Langley offers GCSEs and BTECs as programmes of study for pupils.

== Notable former pupils ==
=== Oldbury Grammar School ===
- Allan Ahlberg (1938– ), children's book author; writer of contemporary children's classics including Each Peach, Pear, Plum, The Jolly Postman and Burglar Bill
- Mick Aston (1946–2013), archaeologist on Time Team
- Steve Bennett ( 1964- ), session drummer live and recording artist.
- Judith Cutler (1946– ), author
- Martin Elliott (1946–2010), photographer best known for the iconic Athena Tennis Girl poster
- Simon Fox (1949– ), drummer, Be-Bop Deluxe
- Sir John Jennings (1937– ), CBE, Chancellor of Loughborough University since 2003; managing director of Shell, 1987–97
- Canon Ralph Stevens (1915–2006), Chaplain to the Queen
- Lewis Stevens (1936– ), MBE, Conservative MP for Nuneaton, 1983–92
- Robin Stubbs (1941– ), Birmingham City and Torquay Utd footballer
- John Bryan Taylor (1928– 2026), Did important work on the H-Bomb helping re-establish UK-USA cooperation. Fondren Professor of Plasma Theory at the University of Texas at Austin, 1989–94; Chief Physicist at the Culham Laboratory, 1981–89
- Peter Withers (1946–2012), youngest Governor of Glasgow's notorious Barlinnie Jail, Europe's busiest prison; board member of the Scottish Prison Service and prison service reformer
- Squadron Leader Bruce McDonald (1930-2018), jet fighter pilot who became one of the best-known instructors at the RAF's Central Flying School. Twice awarded the Air Force Cross for acts of exemplary gallantry while flying
- Tom Price (1928-2021), Journalist, Fleet Street correspondent and founder and editor of a range of leading Warwickshire newspapers

== See also ==
- Q3 Academy Great Barr
- Q3 Academy Tipton
