= Bristnall Hall Academy =

Location
- Bristnall Hall Lane; Oldbury, West Midlands, B68 9PA; England; 52.48453°N 1.99390°W

Information
- Type: Academy
- Established: 1929
- Trust: Academy Transformation Trust
- Department for Education URN: 139043 Tables
- Ofsted: Reports
- Principal: L Simcock
- Gender: Coeducational
- Age: 11 to 16
- Website: http://www.bristnallhallacademy.attrust.org.uk/

Bristnall Hall Academy (formerly Bristnall Hall Technology College and Bristnall Hall High School) is a secondary school with academy status located in Oldbury, West Midlands, England.

== History ==
The school was opened in 1929 to serve the expanding Warley area of Oldbury, and was initially a secondary modern school for pupils who did not pass their 11+ exam - those who did attended Oldbury Grammar School (on becoming a comprehensive in 1974, later known as Langley High) or Oldbury Technical School. The attainment gap between Bristnall and the other local schools closed during the late 1970s when all the local secondary schools became comprehensive schools.

The school received Technology College status in 2005. In 2006, Sandwell Metropolitan Borough Council announced plans to merge Bristnall with nearby Langley High School. However, it was announced in 2007 that the school would be rebuilt on the site of Langley High School as part of the Building Schools for the Future scheme. Langley High School merged with nearby Warley High School to become Oldbury College of Sport (now Oldbury Academy).

The school opened its Sixth Form Centre within the School at the start of the 2010 academic year to Post-16 Students. The school became an academy in December 2012 and was renamed Bristnall Hall Academy supported by the Academy Transformation Trust. In October 2019, the school announced plans to build an extension to the academy. In 2021, the number of students allowed to join the academy increased from 190 to 210.
