= Sarah Webb (housing administrator) =

British housing professional (died 2011)

Sarah Webb CBE (died 4 September 2011) was a British housing professional who was chief executive of the Chartered Institute of Housing from 2008 until 2011.

== Education ==
Webb studied Anthropology at the University of St Andrews before studying Housing at Heriot-Watt University in Edinburgh.

== Career ==
Webb started her career as a housing officer in Glasgow before spending five years as a housing consultant. She became director of Southside Housing Association in Glasgow and worked for Scottish Homes and the Scottish Council for Single Homeless. She later became chair of the Black Country Housing Group. Webb spent time working as Head of the Community Housing Task Force in the Office of the Deputy Prime Minister and as head of housing strategy for Birmingham City Council.

Webb led on policy and practice for the Chartered Institute of Housing from 2003, before being appointed deputy chief executive in January 2007 and chief executive in January 2008. She stepped down in August 2011 due to ill health, and was succeeded by her deputy Grainia Long. Webb died on 4 September 2011.

== Honours ==
Webb was made a Commander of the Order of the British Empire in 2010 for services to the housing sector.
