= Britannia School =

Britannia School may refer to:

- Britannia Secondary School
- Britannia High School
