= Shireland Collegiate Academy =

Location
- Waterloo Road; Smethwick, West Midlands, B66 4ND; England; 52.4843°N 1.9647°W

Information
- Type: Academy
- Established: 1907
- Department for Education URN: 135170 Tables
- Ofsted: Reports
- Head teacher: Tom Daly
- Gender: Coeducational
- Age: 11 to 19
- Website: collegiateacademy.co.uk

Shireland Collegiate Academy is a coeducational secondary school and sixth form in the English academy, located in Smethwick, West Midlands, England. The school was built during the early 20th century and was originally called Shireland High School and later, Shireland Language College. The school has been known as Shireland Collegiate Academy since 2007.

The academy and its predecessor schools were run by Sir Mark Grundy since 1997 who was knighted for his services to education for his work within the school and its partner Academy, before David Irish took over. Shireland Collegiate Academy was in a partnership with George Salter Academy until September 2011 when Shireland became a stand-alone Academy. The academy is fully sponsored by Microsoft. The academy gained 'Teaching School' status in March 2013.

Qamar Riaz is the CEO of Shireland Collegiate Academy Trust, whose headquarters are at the academy.

== Curriculum ==
The academy operates a non-standard curriculum for Key Stage 3. Students are taught for 17 hours with the same teacher in Year 7, 13 hours in Year 8, and 8 hours in Year 9. These groups are taught based on the Literacy for Life (L4L) curriculum taught in a number of thematic units. This methodology is based on the Re-inventing Schools Coalition (RISC) work pioneered in Alaska.

== Composition ==
The Department of Education School Level Census 2010 lists the composition of the academy as follows:

Total Pupils on Roll: 1260

Significant Ethnic Populations:

Ethnicity	Number of Students	Percentage of Roll
White British	206	16%
Indian	193	15%
Pakistani	327	25%
Black African	122	9%
Black Caribbean	113	9%

Gender Split:

Gender	Number of Students	Percentage of Roll
Males	675	55%
Females	585	45%

The academy also has an onsite nursery.
