= Hateley Heath =

Area in West Bromwich, West Midlands, England

Coordinates: 52.538°N 1.996°W

Hateley Heath is a residential area of West Bromwich, West Midlands.The population of the Sandwell ward taken at the 2011 census was 14,227.

== History ==
Although the first major housing developments around Hateley Heath took place in the Heath Lane area during 1930s when private builders built houses within the boundary of West Bromwich, the largest section of Hateley Heath was developed during the late 1940s and early 1950s within the boundaries of West Bromwich and neighbouring Wednesbury, when mass council house building took place. The new homes were initially very popular with their occupants, who appreciated modern facilities such as indoor toilets, bathrooms, running water, electricity and gardens. They had previously lived in 19th century slums which lacked these facilities.

An infant school was built to serve the estate in 1950, replacing facilities at nearby Hill Top, followed by the junior school two years later. The infant and junior schools merged to form a single primary school in September 1999. The senior school at Hill Top remained open and was the most popular destination for the secondary school population of the estate until its closure in the early 1990s, since when nearby Wodensborough has been the main secondary school for pupils living in Hateley Heath.

In 1966, Wednesbury urban district was absorbed into an expanded West Bromwich borough and Hateley Heath was fully incorporated into the township of West Bromwich, within which it has remained ever since. The opposite transfer of township took place with neighbouring Friar Park, which was now within the township of Wednesbury rather than West Bromwich.

By the 1980s, Hateley Heath was plagued by high unemployment and crime, and the condition of the housing was deteriorating. A small section of the estate, consisting of low-rise flats, was demolished between 1988 and 1992, and new housing was built in its place by both the public sector and private sector. Several other houses on the estate have since been demolished and the remaining council properties have been refurbished.

In January 1992, an Express & Star report claimed that Hateley Heath had some of the worst crime rates in the West Midlands. It was estimated that six out of ten children living in Hateley Heath were involved in crime. Joyriding, burglaries, theft and vandalism were just some of the many problems that were reported to be plaguing the area. Several shopkeepers had closed their stores due to extensive theft and vandalism. In 1991 alone, 1,006 crimes were reported on the estate - an average of once in just over eight hours. Car thefts and break-ins were the most common crime in the area, followed closely behind by burglaries and vandalism. During the year, 48 people who lived on the estate were arrested on suspicion of various criminal offences - all but three of the people arrested were aged under 25. Unemployment and social deprivation were blamed for the decline of Hateley Heath, with an unemployment rate of 14.9% in 1991 - well above the national average at the time. However, parts of the nearby towns of Smethwick and Tipton had an even higher unemployment rate at this time, when Britain was in recession.

Hateley Heath has since improved with the aid of local community projects. Private housing was built on the site of the demolished flats. Most of the remaining homes have been comprehensively refurbished, while a small section of the northern part of the estate was demolished in the early 2010s.

== Facilities ==
The estate has been served by an infant school since 1950 and a junior school since 1952. Both of these schools replaced facilities at nearby Hill Top School, which remained open as a secondary school until 1992 and is now the site of a housing development.

A second primary school, Kent Close Primary, was opened on the estate in 1960 to serve the growing 5-11 population. It closed in July 2005 and was later demolished.
