= Wodensborough Ormiston Academy =

Location
- Hydes Road; Wednesbury, West Midlands, WS10 0DR; England; 52.548°N 2.003°W

Information
- Type: Academy
- Established: 1968
- Department for Education URN: 139918 Tables
- Ofsted: Reports
- Head teacher: Leigh Moore
- Gender: Mixed
- Age: 11 to 16
- Website: http://www.woacademy.co.uk

Wodensborough Ormiston Academy is a mixed secondary school located in Wednesbury in the West Midlands of England. It is located on Hydes Road near the border with West Bromwich, and most of the pupils live in the Friar Park and Hateley Heath areas. The school is sponsored by the Ormiston Academies Trust.

Wodensborough High School was formed in September 1968, by the amalgamation of a girls’ grammar school and two secondary modern schools. In September 1990, Wodensborough High School was expanded to take in the youngest two year groups from Hill Top High School in nearby Hill Top, which closed completely two years later. This led to a substantial increase in the school's capacity, as since then it has taken in pupils who would have gone to Hill Top had it remained open. During the specialist schools programme the school gained specialist Technology College status and was renamed Wodensborough Community Technology College.

A newly built block was opened in September 2005, aimed at replacing some of the school's ageing teaching areas. It was named the Vernon Building and has facilities for both physical education and sciences such as a gymnasium, dance hall and eight science laboratories. The North Block of the school was closed in December 2010, revamped and extended on, and reopened in December 2011. The South Block was remodelled during 2012 and opened in time for the new term in September. The plans are estimated to have cost around £20 million. The North and South block refurbishment work was done by Interserve, who took ownership of all of the school's buildings from the Local Authority in 2011 upon opening of the North Block.

The school was converted to academy status on 1 November 2013, and was renamed Wodensborough Ormiston Academy.

== Notable former pupils ==
- Aaron Williams, footballer with Walsall and Worcester City (2005–2010)
