= Perryfields Academy =

Location
- Oldacre Road; Oldbury, West Midlands, B68 0RG; England; 52.46761°N 2.01107°W

Information
- Type: Academy
- Motto: "Together we achieve excellence"
- Established: 1956
- Local authority: Sandwell
- Department for Education URN: 148267 Tables
- Ofsted: Reports
- Headteacher: Stephen Morris
- Gender: Coeducational
- Age: 11 to 16
- Houses: Mariner, Pioneer, Enterprise, Voyager, Challenger
- Colour: Navy Blue
- Website: https://Perryfieldsacademy.co.uk

Perryfields Academy (formerly Perryfields High School) is a coeducational secondary school located on the Brandhall housing estate in Oldbury, West Midlands, England.

== History ==
The school was opened in 1956 as Brandhall secondary modern school and later became a community comprehensive school with Mathematics and Computing College status.

In May 2021 Perryfields High School converted to academy status and was renamed Perryfields Academy. The school is now sponsored by Broadleaf Partnership Trust.

== Ranking ==
In 2009, it was the highest ranking secondary school in Sandwell, with 74% of pupils gaining 5 or more GCSEs at grade C or above.

== Awards and honors ==
The school won the Diana, Princess of Wales Anti-Bullying Award in 2006 for its policy on tackling bullying.
