= Joseph Willott Jr. =

American politician

Joseph Willott Jr. (1855–1936) was a member of the Wisconsin State Assembly.

== Biography ==
Willott was born on June 29, 1855, in Oldbury, Worcestershire, England. He moved to the United States in 1867, settling in Mishawaka, Indiana. In 1872, he moved to Manitowoc, Wisconsin. In 1881, he married Bertha Endress (1858–1930), with whom he raised a son Reuben and a daughter Ada. He was interred on September 19, 1936, in Manitowoc.

== Career ==
Willott was elected to the Assembly in 1898 and was re-elected in 1900 and 1902. Additionally, he was a Manitowoc alderman and was a member of the Manitowoc County Board of Supervisors. He was a Republican.
