= 2006 Sandwell Metropolitan Borough Council election =

2006 UK local government election

Map of the results of the 2006 Sandwell council election. Labour in red, Conservatives in blue, British National Party in dark blue and Liberal Democrats in yellow.

The 2006 Sandwell Metropolitan Borough Council election took place on 4 May 2006 to elect members of Sandwell Metropolitan Borough Council in the West Midlands, England. One third of the council was up for election and the Labour Party stayed in overall control of the council.

After the election, the composition of the council was:

- Labour 50
- Conservative 11
- Liberal Democrat 5
- British National Party 4
- Independent 2

== Campaign ==
24 of the 72 seats on the council were being contested in the election, with Labour holding control beforehand with 53 seats.

The election saw 9 candidates from the British National Party, part of a record number for the party in the West Midlands.

In the run up to the election councillor Alan Burkitt was arrested by the police on suspicion of selling his girlfriend for sex. As a result, Burkitt, representing Charlemont with Grove Vale ward, was suspended from the Conservative Party; Burkitt had previously been a Liberal Democrat councillor before defecting to the Conservatives.

During the election the Conservative candidate in Tipton Green Shahzad Chaudhry accused the Labour councillor, Ahmadul Haque, of breaking the code of conduct for candidates by giving his home number for voters who wanted help with postal votes, however Haque denied he had done anything wrong. Meanwhile, Chaudhry received the backing of the former British National Party organiser for the West Midlands, Steve Edwards, in the election for Tipton Green.

== Election result ==
The results saw the British National Party win 3 seats, all gains from Labour. The gains for the British National Party came in the wards of Great Bridge, Princes End and Tividale, taking the party to 4 seats on the council. Labour dropped to 50 seats, after losing 4 but gaining another 1, the Conservatives stayed on 11 seats, the Liberal Democrats 5 and independents on 2 seats.

Sandwell local election result 2006
Party	Seats	Gains	Losses	Net gain/loss	Seats %	Votes %	Votes	+/−
Labour	15	1	4	-3	62.5	44.2	33,127	-6.5%
Conservative	4	1	1	0	16.7	27.1	20,321	-1.0%
BNP	3	3	0	+3	12.5	12.4	9,268	+8.4%
Liberal Democrats	2	0	0	0	8.3	15.0	11,263	+1.7%
Independent	0	0	0	0	0	0.8	621	+0.7%
Green	0	0	0	0	0	0.4	317	+0.4%

== Ward results ==
Abbey
Party	Candidate	Votes	%	±%
Labour	Robert Piper	1,592	48.9	
Conservative	Ewart Johnson	968	29.7	
Liberal Democrats	Roger Prior	695	21.4	
Majority		624	19.2	
Turnout		3,255		
Labour hold		Swing		

Blackheath
Party	Candidate	Votes	%	±%
Conservative	Shirley Ching	1,330	46.5	
Labour	Susan Downing	1,265	44.2	
Liberal Democrats	Mazhar Hussain	267	9.3	
Majority		65	2.3	
Turnout		2,862		
Conservative gain from Labour		Swing		

Bristnall
Party	Candidate	Votes	%	±%
Labour	Steven Frear	1,486	49.9	
Conservative	Terence Grainger	1,088	36.6	
Liberal Democrats	Sandra Berisford	402	13.5	
Majority		398	13.3	
Turnout		2,976		
Labour gain from Conservative		Swing		

Charlemont with Grove Vale
Party	Candidate	Votes	%	±%
Conservative	Tony Ward	1,737	48.6	
Liberal Democrats	Keith Allcock	830	23.2	
Labour	Jean Heywood	750	21.0	
Independent	Kathleen Ryan	254	7.1	
Majority		907	25.4	
Turnout		3,571		
Conservative hold		Swing		

Cradley Heath and Old Hill
Party	Candidate	Votes	%	±%
Labour	Glenis Webb	1,545	53.0	
Conservative	Ronald Griffiths	1,372	47.0	
Majority		173	6.0	
Turnout		2,917		
Labour hold		Swing		

Friar Park
Party	Candidate	Votes	%	±%
Labour	Simon Hackett	1,127	47.9	
Conservative	Barry Nelson	903	38.4	
Liberal Democrats	Dorothy Brayshaw	321	13.7	
Majority		224	9.5	
Turnout		2,351		
Labour hold		Swing		

Great Barr with Yew Tree
Party	Candidate	Votes	%	±%
Liberal Democrats	Mary Wilson	1,212	31.5	
BNP	Scott Dale	970	25.2	
Labour	Harbinder Deol	957	24.9	
Conservative	Stephanie Page	703	18.3	
Majority		242	6.3	
Turnout		3,842		
Liberal Democrats hold		Swing		

Great Bridge
Party	Candidate	Votes	%	±%
BNP	Simon Smith	1,278	45.1	
Labour	Maureen Whitehouse	1,096	38.7	
Liberal Democrats	Philip Roberts	461	16.3	
Majority		182	6.4	
Turnout		2,835		
BNP gain from Labour		Swing		

Greets Green and Lyng
Party	Candidate	Votes	%	±%
Labour	Robert Badham	1,340	46.5	
BNP	Gordon Howells	793	27.5	
Conservative	Elaine Fitzpatrick	475	16.5	
Liberal Democrats	Dorothy Jones	246	8.5	
Independent	Ivor Morgan	30	1.0	
Majority		547	19.0	
Turnout		2,884		
Labour hold		Swing		

Hateley Heath
Party	Candidate	Votes	%	±%
Labour	Terry Williams	1,411	45.1	
BNP	Sarah Dale	951	30.4	
Liberal Democrats	Rachel Cheeseman	416	13.3	
Conservative	Robert Lawrence	351	11.2	
Majority		460	14.7	
Turnout		3,129		
Labour hold		Swing		

Langley
Party	Candidate	Votes	%	±%
Labour	Mick Davies	1,263	39.8	
BNP	Karen Parkes	876	27.6	
Conservative	Leslie Pawlowski	777	24.5	
Liberal Democrats	Michael Allcock	257	8.1	
Majority		387	12.2	
Turnout		3,173		
Labour hold		Swing		

Newton
Party	Candidate	Votes	%	±%
Liberal Democrats	Anthony Underhill	1,424	42.9	
Labour	David Hosell	1,119	33.7	
Conservative	Valerie Ward	778	23.4	
Majority		305	9.2	
Turnout		3,321		
Liberal Democrats hold		Swing		

Oldbury
Party	Candidate	Votes	%	±%
Labour	Mahboob Hussain	2,347	64.5	
Conservative	David Hadley	989	27.2	
Liberal Democrats	Emma Underhill	300	8.3	
Majority		1,358	37.3	
Turnout		3,636		
Labour hold		Swing		

Old Warley
Party	Candidate	Votes	%	±%
Conservative	John McHard	1,419	43.7	
Labour	Susan Crumpton	1,268	39.0	
Liberal Democrats	Christopher Reed	562	17.3	
Majority		151	4.7	
Turnout		3,249		
Conservative hold		Swing		

Princes End
Party	Candidate	Votes	%	±%
BNP	Russell Green	1,128	43.5	
Labour	June Newell	1,050	40.5	
Conservative	Jean Nugent	415	16.0	
Majority		78	3.0	
Turnout		2,593		
BNP gain from Labour		Swing		

Rowley
Party	Candidate	Votes	%	±%
Labour	William Thomas	1,524	56.1	
Conservative	Joanne Hadley	1,192	43.9	
Majority		332	12.2	
Turnout		2,716		
Labour hold		Swing		

St Pauls
Party	Candidate	Votes	%	±%
Labour	Gurinder Josan	2,196	53.5	
Conservative	Mohammed Ahmed	1,370	33.4	
Liberal Democrats	Russell George	414	10.1	
Independent	Kulbir Singh	121	3.0	
Majority		826	20.1	
Turnout		4,101		
Labour hold		Swing		

Smethwick
Party	Candidate	Votes	%	±%
Labour	Victor Silvester	1,730	61.7	
Liberal Democrats	Ronald Hackett	858	30.6	
Independent	Narinder Dosanjh	216	7.7	
Majority		872	31.1	
Turnout		2,804		
Labour hold		Swing		

Soho and Victoria
Party	Candidate	Votes	%	±%
Labour	Mohammad Rouf	1,942	65.5	
Liberal Democrats	Shamim Ahmed	708	23.9	
Green	Shari Temochin	317	10.7	
Majority		1,234	41.6	
Turnout		2,967		
Labour hold		Swing		

Tipton Green
Party	Candidate	Votes	%	±%
Labour	Ahmadul Haque	1,268	35.7	
BNP	Steven Parkes	1,195	33.6	
Conservative	Chaudhry Shehzad	1,091	30.7	
Majority		73	2.1	
Turnout		3,554		
Labour hold		Swing		

Tividale
Party	Candidate	Votes	%	±%
BNP	Carl Butler	1,191	37.0	
Labour	Lorraine Ashman	1,158	36.0	
Conservative	Michael Hardy	562	17.5	
Liberal Democrats	Diane Gorton	308	9.6	
Majority		33	1.0	
Turnout		3,219		
BNP gain from Labour		Swing		

Wednesbury North
Party	Candidate	Votes	%	±%
Conservative	Mavis Hughes	1,533	61.6	
Labour	Tony Middleton	659	26.5	
Liberal Democrats	Martin Roebuck	298	12.0	
Majority		874	35.1	
Turnout		2,490		
Conservative hold		Swing		

Wednesbury South
Party	Candidate	Votes	%	±%
Labour	Elizabeth Giles	1,256	39.4	
BNP	Sharon Butler	886	27.8	
Conservative	Alan Nugent	822	25.8	
Liberal Democrats	Richard Mitchener	222	7.0	
Majority		370	11.6	
Turnout		3,186		
Labour hold		Swing		

West Bromwich Central
Party	Candidate	Votes	%	±%
Labour	Mohinder Tagger	1,778	54.1	
Liberal Democrats	Jarnail Sandhu	1,062	32.3	
Conservative	Christine Vickers	446	13.6	
Majority		716	21.8	
Turnout		3,286		
Labour hold		Swing		
