= St Michael's Church of England High School, Rowley Regis =

St Michael's CofE High School

Location
- Curral Road; Rowley Regis, West Midlands, B65 9AF; England
- Coordinates: 52°29′36″N 2°02′19″W

Information
- Type: Voluntary aided school
- Religious affiliation: Church of England
- Local authority: Sandwell
- Department for Education URN: 104019 Tables
- Ofsted: Reports
- Head teacher: Christina Handy-Rivett
- Staff: 115
- Gender: Coeducational
- Age: 11 to 16
- Enrolment: 1250
- Website: https://st-michaels.sandwell.sch.uk/

St Michael's Church of England High School is a coeducational Church of England secondary school located in Rowley Regis, West Midlands, England. It was built during the 1960s and relocated from there to its current site on Curral Road in May 2011.

The school takes its name from St Michael's Church, situated some two miles away in the township of Langley.

Notable pupils include Carlton Palmer former English professional football player who played as a midfielder, most notably for Sheffield Wednesday.

It has been the only school in Rowley Regis since the closure of Britannia High School in 2002.

The school consists of three floors with classrooms for every subject available on the United Kingdom curriculum. An estimated 1250 students are enrolled in the school.
