= The People's Orchestra =

- Play, Inspire, Achieve
- Abbreviation: TPO
- Legal status: Charity
- Location: West Bromwich Town Hall Lodge Road, West Bromwich Sandwell West Midlands B70 8DY
- Region served: Sandwell, England
- Website: The People's Orchestra

The People's Orchestra (TPO) is a community-based non-profit orchestra based in West Bromwich Town Hall, England.

Established in 2012 by Sarah Marshall, The People's Orchestra performs a variety of concerts, festivals, conventions and recordings predominantly in Birmingham and West Bromwich. The charities ensembles perform an array of music spanning from film, TV and musicals, alongside other not so traditional sources such as video game themes and pop music. TPO is a 'diverse mix' of talented musicians of all ages who come together as a full orchestra or in smaller groups to create and perform across the Midlands.

As an independent charity it has also developed a volunteer programme called TPO Bridge, which helps local unemployed people back into work.

== The People's Orchestra Birmingham ==
The People's Orchestra Charity set up its initial namesake ensemble in Birmingham, which has remained its home since 2012. The ensemble and charity commenced its first public performance busking with a five piece brass group outside Birmingham Bullring Shopping Centre.

The People's Orchestra's performances include concert performances throughout the Midlands (such as Jukebox Live, an audience choice orchestral and choral concert held at Birmingham Symphony Hall). TPO also joins festival and conventions to perform fan favourite themed music, including playing at MCM Comic Con and performing Lord OF The Rings themes for the Tolkien Society.

The People's Orchestra (TPO) in Birmingham requires prospective musicians to play to a Grade 7 and above standard, and must have good sight-reading of music.. The ensemble offers free trial rehearsals for all musicians looking to settle in to the group and enjoy community music making.

== Ensembles & Subsidiaries ==
=== Cerddorfa'r Bobl Carmarthen ===
In August 2026, the charity launched Cerddorfa'r Bobl - The People's Orchestra, in Carmarthen. Performing the same repertoire as the Birmingham group, Cerddorfa'r Bobl welcomes musicians from across South West Wales. Their first concert will be on 28 November 2026, at Swansea Minster.

=== The Rusty Player's Orchestras ===
The People's Orchestra also founded The Rusty Players Orchestras, for musicians looking to resume playing their instruments, and a virtual orchestral performance created from membership instrument recordings called Sofa Symphonies, which launched in 2020. By 2026, there were four branches of this orchestra, two in the West Midlands, in South Birmingham and Bilston, and two in South Wales, in Barry Island and Carmarthen. The orchestras in the West Midlands and Barry Island were handed over to community ownership in July 2026.

=== The People's Show Choirs ===
In 2019 TPO also launched The People's Show Choir, encompassing a number of choirs performing film, show and light popular music across The Midlands.

Choir locations as of August 2026 include: Bearwood, [https://thepeoplesorchestra.com/choir-in-black-isle/ Black Isle, Brackley, Cardiff, Carmarthen, Cheltenham, Dorridge, Dudley, Halesowen, Leamington Spa, Leeds, Malvern, Newport, Oswestry, Shrewsbury, South Birmingham, Sutton Coldfield, Walsall, West Bromwich, Weston-super-mare, Wimbledon, Wolverhampton, Woodford Green, York.

=== The People's Big Band ===
The Peoples Orchestra started The People's Big Band in 2022. This is a group dedicated to reinventing modern hits with the crisp jazzy sounds of the 40s. So far, the only branch for this group is in Birmingham, and have performed at many venues across the city, including Snobs Nightclub, Birmingham Botanical Gardens and Birmingham Jazz and Blues Festival.

=== Sing From Your Sofa / Sing Together ===
The People's Orchestra launched the Sing From Your Sofa project, encouraging choir members to continue rehearsing and creating virtual performances form home.

TPO also runs a Sing Together Workshop programme, encouraging care and residential home members and staff to have fun with singing.

== Concert History ==
=== 2012-2015 ===
The People's Orchestra's first concert, titled 'trailers' was held at the Adrian Boult Hall in Birmingham on 4 November 2012. The concert was compered by Les Ross and contained film music and light popular music. Their anniversary concert was performed on 24 March 2013 at The Public in West Bromwich, where the programme included both classical and modern-day film music.

The People's Orchestra produced their 'Sporting Classics' concert on 8 June 2013 at The Public, performing music including The Chain by Fleetwood Mac, Ravel's Bolero and Pop looks Bach. Their War themed concert was held on 21 September 2013 and included music from Dambusters, Saving Private Ryan, Star Wars and The Great Escape. The first TPO Christmas Concerts – Christmas Music by Candlelight and The Snowman, were held at the Malvern Forum Theatre on 8 December 2013, where the orchestra performed both Christmas Carols and The Snowman live to film.

In 2014, The People's Orchestra began their concert series with 'The Love Concert', held in Lichfield Guild Hall and including music from Dirty Dancing, Beauty and the Beast, Moulin Rouge and West Side Story. This was followed by a 2nd Birthday Concert on 6 April 2014 at West Bromwich Town Hall. On 22 July 2014, The People's Orchestra launched their film greats concert series in the Adrian Boult Hall in Birmingham. Conducted by Christopher Evans, music included highlights from Harry Potter, Lord of the Rings and Warhorse. This concert also launched the world premier of ‘Flight of the Pegasus’, a new composition created by professional composer John Koutselinis.

The People's Orchestra also featured on stage at the Pride of Birmingham Awards, held at Birmingham Town Hall in 2014.

In October 2014 at West Bromwich Town Hall, The People's Orchestra produced their 'Fright Night Halloween Special concert', conducted by John Brennan. The repertoire included Corpse Bride and Phantom of the Opera. Something Magical: Far Far Away saw The People's Orchestra's next instalment of Christmas music in December 2014. With an animation theme, music included highlights from Frozen, Alice in Wonderland, Brave and The Little Mermaid.

The first concert of 2015 for TPO, 'There and Back Again', was created to show the greatest hits of the orchestra since its inception. It was followed by the concert Out of This World, a sci fi themed concert with music from Treasure Planet, ET, Back to the Future and Apollo 13. This concert was conducted by Dan Watson. On 11 June 2015, The People's Orchestra featured on Stage alongside guest speakers for TEDx Birmingham, held at Birmingham Town Hall. In the same month The People's Orchestra also held their first Midsummer Night's Ball, to feature dancing, dinner and music in The Great Hall at the University of Birmingham. Music included songs from Glenn Miller, Riverdance, Sleeping Beauty and other light popular music. The People's Orchestra also launched multiple Christmas Concerts in 2015, spanning over a week in December. Christmas Music and Majesty, as well as Something Magical, were produced in multiple locations and detailed Christmas Carols and Film Scores.

In August 2015, The People's Orchestra had the opportunity to work with the renowned composer and saxophonist John Altman.

=== 2016-2020 ===
2016 saw the first concert in the 'Legends' series, specifically spanning Superhero Symphonies. Conducted by Dan Watson, music included themes from Spiderman, Batman, Thor, Iron Man and Superman. The 4th Birthday concert titled ‘Saturday Night at the Movies’, showcased music from James Bond, The Magnificent Seven and Transformers, as well as world premiere of a new tailored composition called ‘All at C’, created and performed alongside John Altman.

The orchestra became better known after participating in BBC4 & BBC2's All Together Now: The Great Orchestra Challenge, managing to finish fourth. During the course of the programme they got the chance to showcase their musical skills at the Maida Vale Studios and the Bridgewater Hall in Manchester.

The 5th Birthday Concert titled 'Songs from the Shows' was performed on 1 April 2017 at West Bromwich Town Hall, including themes from Evita, Mary Poppins, Chicago and Les Misérables. This was followed by and On the Battlefield Concert on 3 July at the same venue. The People's Orchestra also collaborated on the performance titled The Greatest Concert of All, conducted by Rob Spalton, at the Walsall Arboretum. In 2017, film composer John Koutselinis collaborated with The People's Orchestra for the music piece 'Beyond the Skies', which was written specifically for the orchestra, and the end credits from a film by K&K productions titled 'Cable: The Chronicles of Hope', performed at the New Alexandra Theatre for the concert 'Legends: Superhero Symphonies'.

Fantastic Beats[sic] and Where to Find Them was a concert produced on 14 October 2017, including highlights from Harry Potter and Fantastic Beasts and Where to Find Them. TPO's 6th Birthday concert was founded in tribute to the scores of Micheal Giacchino, and included music from Star Trek, A Star Wars Story and Ratatouille.

Pete Cater has participated within the percussion section at TPO concerts. Cater has been named in the top 8 jazz drummers in the world by Rhythm magazine's Poll.

The People's Orchestra constructed a flash mob in collaboration with Virgin Trains, held during transit from London Euston to Birmingham. Their second flash mob was organised at the NEC during a Yogscast Panel Event, to perform the theme Diggy Diggy Hole.

TPO has organised and begun an exchange tour programme with Orchestre Philharmonia Mundi de Montréal (OPMM) in Canada. The orchestra performed live at the 2019 handover ceremony for the Commonwealth Games, then anticipated to be held in Birmingham in 2020.

Also, TPO put on a their Superhero Symphonies concert in September 2019, followed by their Film Greats Christmas concert that same year.

=== 2020 onwards ===
During 2022, The Peoples Orchestra has been running the Commonwealth Community Music Initiative, known as CCMI. This is a programme which offers opportunity to musicians from all corners of the Commonwealth, an initiative with the intent to showcase the immense talents of such a diverse community. It includes a composition contest, with winning pieces to be showcased during the Gala Curiosity Concert in July.

TPO concerts in 2022 include Heroes and Villains in May, a Curiosity Concert (immediately preceding the Commonwealth games in Birmingham) in July followed by their Fright Night concert in October and a Circus Christmas concert in December.

== Management ==
=== Sarah Marshall ===
Sarah Marshall has been the Artistic and Managing Director of The People's Orchestra since she created the orchestra back in 2012; the orchestra has over 60 members.
