= West Bromwich Town Hall =

Municipal building in West Bromwich, West Midlands, England

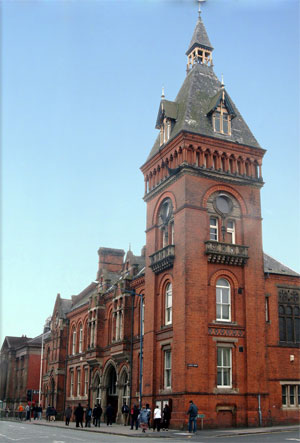
- West Bromwich Town Hall

- Location within West Midlands county

General information
- Architectural style: Italian Gothic style
- Classification

Listed Building – Grade II
- Designated: 29 September 1987
- Reference no.: 1077117
- Location: West Bromwich, West Midlands, England
- Coordinates: 52°31′14.16″N 1°59′53.15″W
- Construction started: 1874
- Completed: 1875

Design and construction
- Architecture firm: Alexander & Henman
- Main contractor: Trow & Sons of Wednesbury

West Bromwich Town Hall is a municipal building in West Bromwich, West Midlands, England. It is a Grade II listed building.

== History ==
The town hall was commissioned at the instigation of the West Bromwich Town Improvement Commissioners, chaired by Reuben Farley. The site selected, known as the Lodge Estate, located on West Bromwich Heath, was purchased from the descendants of William Izon, a local iron-founder. The building, which was designed by Alexander & Henman of Stockton-on-Tees in the Italian Gothic style, was built in brick and stone by Trow & Sons of Wednesbury between 1874 and 1875. The existing reading room was converted into an enlarged council chamber in 1924 and the building was extended to create a new reading room at that time.

The American singer and pianist, Jerry Lee Lewis, performed in the town hall in 1964 and, more recently, the People's Orchestra have given regular performances.

The town hall was the headquarters of the county borough of West Bromwich and initially remained the local seat of government after Sandwell Metropolitan Borough Council was formed in 1974. However, the council moved to a modern facility, known as Sandwell Council House, in Freeth Street in Oldbury in 1989.

== Description ==
The arches at the entrance of the building are decorated with carved heads representing the months of the year, while the corridor encircling the main hall is tiled with paving by Maw & Company of Coalbrookdale. The ceilings, the iron work, the walls and pillars have been decorated from designs by the architects and the "harmonious blending of colours, and the magnificent stencil work costing many days of artistic and patient labour, cannot be too highly praised and words can hardly express the charming effect they have produced." The main tower is 130 feet (40 m) high. The fine carvings are by the local sculptor, John Roddis, and depict the labours of the 12 months of the year.

== Grand Organ ==
The Grand Organ in the main hall was a gift from Alexander Brogden, MP for Wednesbury, in 1878. It was built by Forster and Andrews of Hull following the International Exhibition of 1862 and is one of twelve organs built for town halls up and down the country by the firm. In May 1997 the organ was awarded a certificate by the British Institute of Organ Studies (BIOS) as it was considered to be of historic importance for its musical and technical qualities. It was recorded as historic in the National Pipe Organ Register at Cambridge University. A specification of the organ can be found on the National Pipe Organ Register.
