= Brades Village =

Coordinates: 52.50°N 02.04°W

- Location within the West Midlands
- OS grid reference: SO9790
- Metropolitan county: West Midlands
- Region: West Midlands
- Country: England
- Sovereign state: United Kingdom
- Post town: Oldbury
- Postcode district: B69
- Police: West Midlands
- Fire: West Midlands
- Ambulance: West Midlands

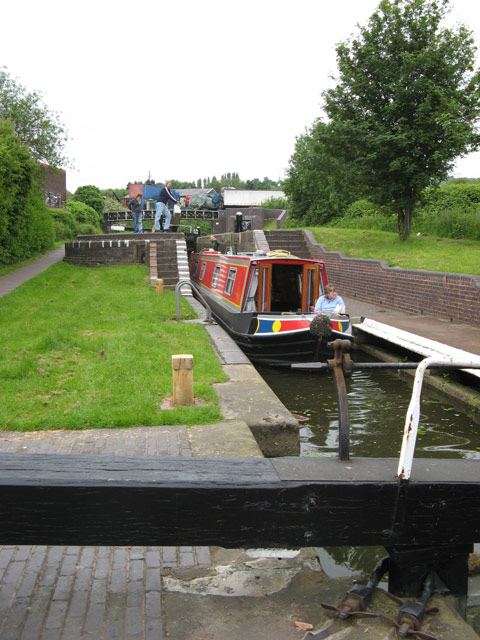
Canal locks in Brades

Brades Village is an area of Oldbury, West Midlands, England. Population details as taken at the 2011 census can be found under the Tividale ward of Sandwell.
