= Brandhall =

Coordinates: 52.47°N 2.00°W

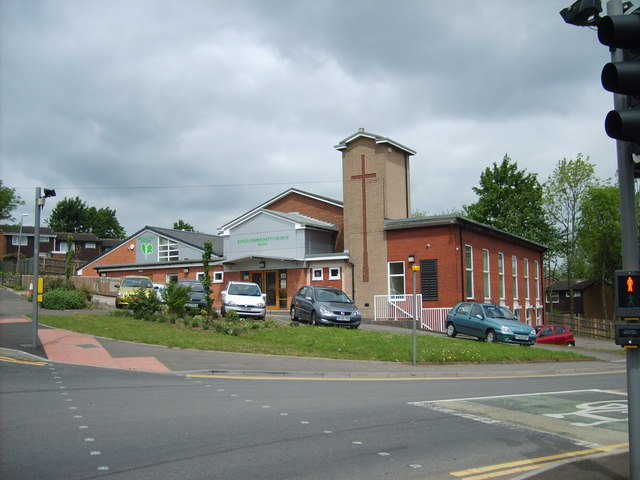
- King's Community Church & Oak Tree Centre

- Location within the West Midlands
- Population: 23,084 (2001 Population Census)
- OS grid reference: SO990846
- Metropolitan borough: Sandwell
- Metropolitan county: West Midlands
- Region: West Midlands
- Country: England
- Sovereign state: United Kingdom
- Post town: OLDBURY
- Postcode district: B68
- Dialling code: 0121
- Police: West Midlands
- Fire: West Midlands
- Ambulance: West Midlands

Brandhall is a suburb of Oldbury in the south of the Metropolitan Borough of Sandwell, West Midlands, bordering Birmingham and Halesowen. The development of the area commenced during the 1930s with the construction of several hundred private houses along the Hagley Road and Wolverhampton Road, as well as several side roads leading off the main dual carriageways. Oldbury Corporation founded a municipal farm in 1943. In 1949, the farm included a piggery, and fields growing wheat, potatoes, barley, hay, clover and oats. Oldbury Council placed a public notice for the demolition and removal of the farm buildings in February 1952. Most of Brandhall was developed in the 1950s and 1960s, when several thousand council houses, flats and bungalows were built by Oldbury Council on farmland to the south of Brand Hall. The Hall, which had become the clubhouse for Brandhall Golf Course, was demolished. Some of the first families moving on to the estate were relocating from Smethwick. Most of the high and medium-rise flats in Brandhall were demolished in the early 2000s and in their place housing associations built new low-rise homes.

Brandhall (along with the rest of the Oldbury borough, and the neighbouring boroughs of Smethwick and Rowley Regis) became part of the County Borough of Warley in 1966, but this arrangement lasted just eight years until Warley merged with West Bromwich to form Sandwell Metropolitan Borough in 1974.

Perryfields Academy is the area's secondary school and adjoins Perryfields Primary School, which opened in 1956. Brandhall Primary School is on Brennand Road. Brandhall public library opened in July 1961.

The King's Community Church was originally opened as Brandhall Baptist Church by Sir Alfred Owen on 5 January 1963.

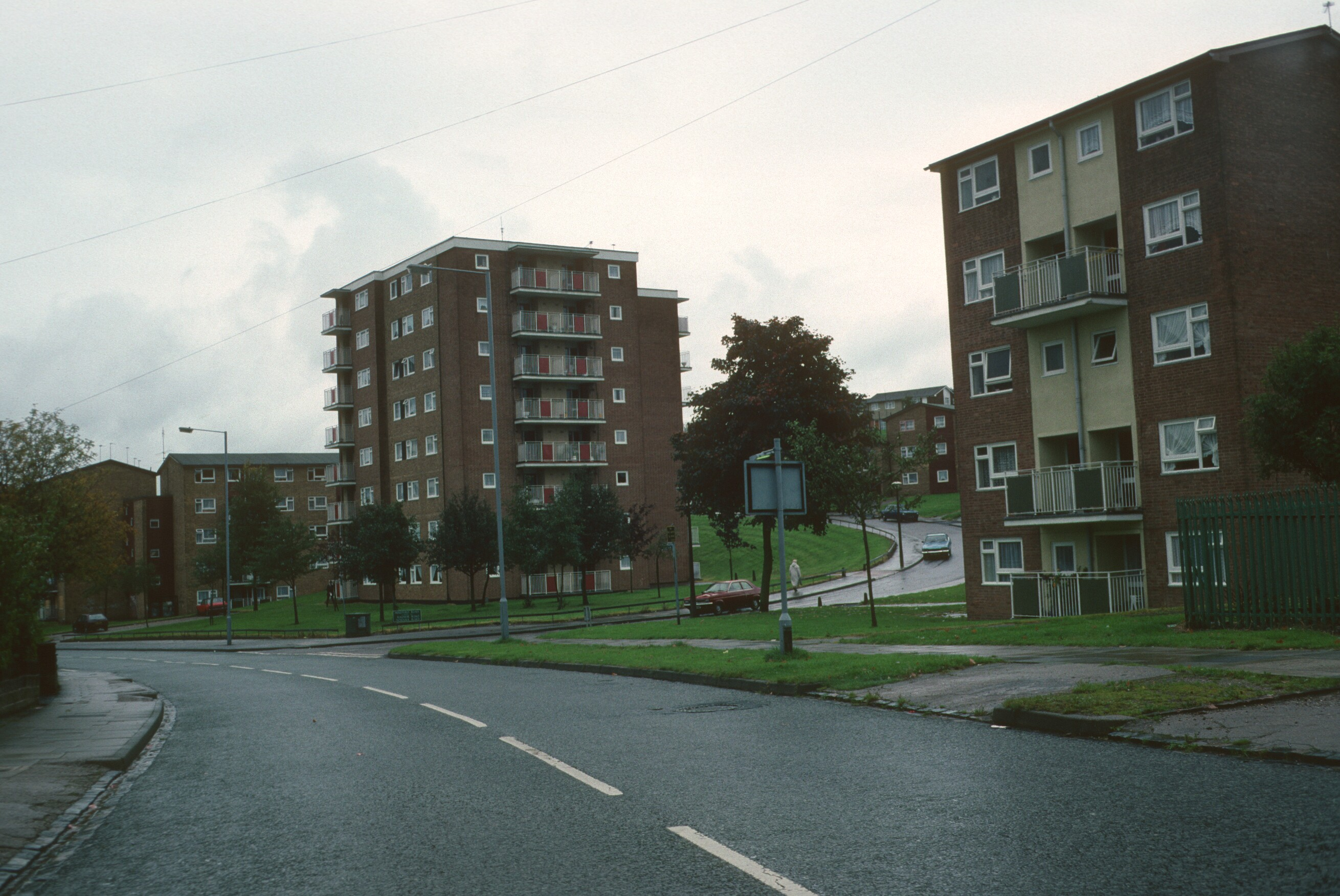
Blocks on Kingsway in 1987

== Brandhall ward ==
Brandhall was the name of an electoral ward of Oldbury Municipal Borough from its formation in 1935, when three independents were elected; and a ward of Warley County Borough from 1966 to 1974 following Oldbury's merger with the County Borough of Smethwick and Rowley Regis Municipal Borough. In June 1964, Brandhall ward was described as "a Tory stronghold", and in February 1966 duly elected three Conservatives to the inaugural Warley County Borough council.

== Nearest places ==
- Quinton
- Warley
- Hurst Green
- Bearwood
- Halesowen
