= 2026 Sandwell Metropolitan Borough Council election =

2026 English local government election

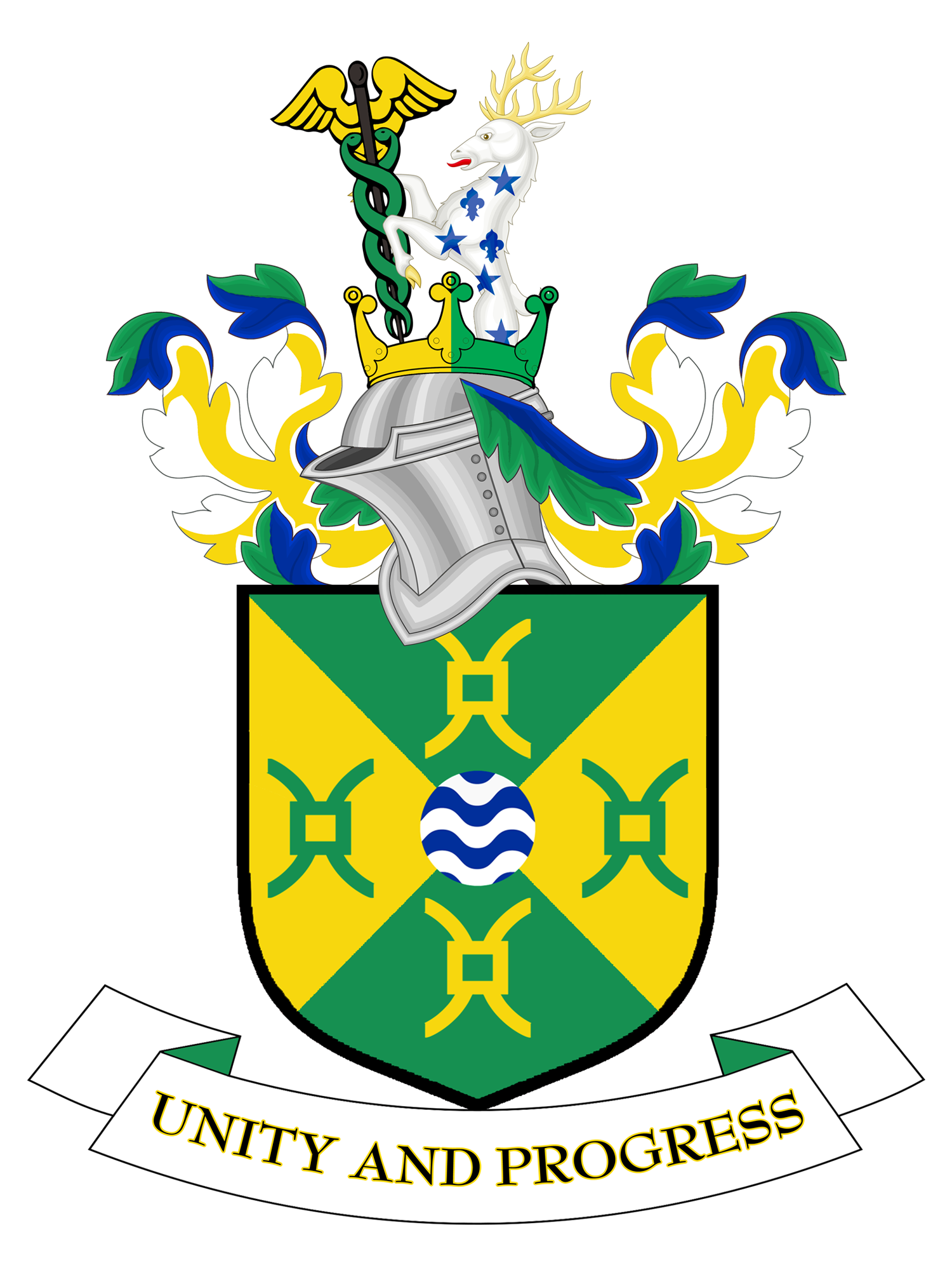
- 7 May 2026

All 72 seats to Sandwell Metropolitan Borough Council 37 seats needed for a majority
- Registered: 237,825
- Turnout: 81,907; 34.4%
	First party	Second party	Third party
Leader		Kerrie Carmichael defeated
Party	Reform	Labour	Green
Last election	0 seats, 7.5%	64 seats, 56.9%	0 seats, 5.5%
Seats before	0	61 (Note: Including the vacant seat in Wednesbury South last held by Labour.)	2
Seats won	41	28	2
Seat change	▲41	▼33	Steady
Popular vote	82,541	78,083	36,968
Percentage	36.3%	34.3%	16.2%
Swing	▲28.8%	▼22.6%	▲10.7%
	Fourth party	Fifth party
Leader		Amrita Dunn defeated
Party	Independent	Conservative
Last election	3 seats, 4.5%	5 seats, 21.3%
Seats before	5	4
Seats won	1	0
Seat change	▼4	▼4
Popular vote	2,273	24,071
Percentage	1.0%	10.6%
Swing	▼3.5%	▼10.7%
Leader before election
Kerrie Carmichael
Labour
Leader after election
Ray Nock
Reform

The 2026 Sandwell Metropolitan Borough Council election was held on 7 May 2026, alongside the other local elections across the United Kingdom being held on the same day. All 72 members of Sandwell Metropolitan Borough Council were elected following ward boundary changes.

Prior to the election, the council had been under Labour majority control since 1979. At this election Reform UK, which had no seats on the council prior to the election, won 41 seats, giving them an overall majority. Labour lost over half their seats, including that of the incumbent leader of the council, Kerrie Carmichael. After the election, the new Reform group chose Ray Nock to be its leader. He was formally appointed as the new leader of the council at the subsequent annual council meeting on 26 May 2026.

== Background ==
In 2024, Labour retained control of the council.

== Election result ==
Council composition after the 2024 election

Council composition after the 2026 election

2026 Sandwell Metropolitan Borough Council election
Party	Candidates	Seats	Gains	Losses	Net gain/loss	Seats %	Votes %	Votes	+/−
Reform	72	41	N/A	N/A	▲41	56.9	36.3	82,541	+28.8
Labour	72	28	N/A	N/A	▼33	37.5	34.3	78,083	–22.6
Green	72	2	N/A	N/A	Steady	4.17	16.2	36,968	+10.7
Independent	5	1	N/A	N/A	▼4	1.4	1.00	2,273	–3.5
Conservative	72	0	N/A	N/A	▼4	0.0	10.6	24,071	–10.7
Liberal Democrats	15	0	N/A	N/A	Steady	0.0	1.4	3,202	–2.0
TUSC	2	0	N/A	N/A	Steady	0.0	0.1	272	–0.6
Advance UK	1	0	N/A	N/A	Steady	0.0	<0.1	113	N/A
Yeshua	1	0	N/A	N/A	Steady	0.0	<0.1	38	±0.0

== Ward results ==
=== Bearwood ===
Bearwood (3 seats)
Party	Candidate	Votes	%
Green	Hilary Grandey	1,599	39.7
Green	John Tipper	1,569	39.0
Labour	Jennifer Hemingway*	1,535	38.1
Green	Paul Connor	1,493	37.1
Labour	Bobbie Fenton	1,472	37.1
Labour	Sita Malhi	1,306	32.4
Reform	Paul Bithell	818	20.3
Reform	Nathan Poole	721	17.9
Reform	Robert White	683	17.0
Conservative	Leon Barnfield	343	8.5
Conservative	Balbinder Kaur	261	6.5
Conservative	Karol Krupa	201	5.0
TUSC	Richard Gingell	58	1.4
Turnout		4,243	40.9
Registered electors		10,385	
Green win (new seat)			
Green win (new seat)			
Labour win (new seat)			

=== Blackheath ===
Blackheath (3 seats)
Party	Candidate	Votes	%	±%
Reform	Michael Cooper	1,985	53.8	+40.1
Reform	Dave Williams	1,800	48.8	+35.1
Reform	Mona Khurana	1,668	45.2	+31.5
Labour	Kerrie Carmichael*	1,099	29.8	–22.2
Labour	Jag Singh*	892	24.2	–27.8
Labour	Shobha Sharma	860	23.3	–28.7
Green	Deborah White	541	14.7	+7.8
Conservative	Gemma Barnfield	488	13.2	–9.7
Green	Ellis Wood	477	12.9	+6.0
Green	Richard Watson	443	12.0	+5.1
Conservative	Bhapinder Bains	385	10.4	–12.5
Conservative	Karolina Kordala	329	8.9	–14.0
Independent	Randall Shergill	100	2.7	–1.8
Turnout		3,921	34.9	+10.0
Registered electors		11,227		
Reform gain from Labour				
Reform gain from Labour				
Reform gain from Labour				

=== Bristnall ===
Bristnall (3 seats)
Party	Candidate	Votes	%	±%
Reform	Jonathan Fox	1,283	38.3	+25.2
Labour	Amolak Dhariwal*	1,215	36.2	–22.3
Reform	Liane Winsper	1,148	34.2	+21.1
Labour	Ellen Fenton*	1,138	33.9	–24.6
Reform	Ravinder Singh	1,131	33.7	+20.6
Labour	Tom Johnston*	1,100	32.8	–25.7
Green	Kalman Dean-Richards	676	20.2	N/A
Green	Louise Brunt	639	19.1	N/A
Green	Richard Touzjian	509	15.2	N/A
Conservative	Colin Blewitt	486	14.5	–4.7
Conservative	Amran Jaypal	392	11.7	–7.5
Conservative	Rafal Dobiczek	343	10.2	–9.0
Turnout		3,629	34.5	+7.0
Registered electors		10,529		
Reform gain from Labour				
Labour hold				
Reform gain from Labour				

=== Charlemont & Grove Vale ===
Charlemont & Grove Vale (3 seats)
Party	Candidate	Votes	%	±%
Reform	Bob Jones	1,499	40.5	+32.6
Reform	Ray Nock	1,487	40.2	+32.3
Reform	Rachael Mitchell	1,443	39.0	+31.1
Labour	Dalel Bhamra*	1,131	30.5	–15.1
Conservative	David Fisher	868	23.4	–14.9
Labour	Satish Paul	864	23.3	–22.3
Labour	Stephanie Thomas	817	22.1	–23.5
Conservative	Aran Duggal	772	20.8	–17.5
Conservative	Amrita Dunn	673	18.2	–20.1
Green	Parminder Bahia	531	14.3	+10.1
Green	Maddi Lane	438	11.8	+7.6
Green	Primrose Taylor	403	10.9	+6.7
Liberal Democrats	Bertram Richards	182	4.9	+3.1
Turnout		4,074	39.9	+4.7
Registered electors		10,202		
Reform gain from Conservative				
Reform gain from Labour				
Reform gain from Conservative				

=== Cradley Heath & Old Hill ===
Cradley Heath & Old Hill (3 seats)
Party	Candidate	Votes	%	±%
Reform	Mark Johnson	1,482	46.3	+35.5
Reform	Craig Morris	1,430	44.7	+33.9
Reform	Nathan Williams	1,392	43.5	+32.7
Labour	Julie Webb*	919	28.7	–25.6
Labour	Tom Knowles	908	28.4	–25.9
Labour	Sheraz Khan	836	26.1	–28.2
Green	Katherine Anderson	566	17.7	+9.1
Green	Brad Dymond	435	13.6	+5.0
Green	Awais Qaisar	387	12.1	+3.5
Conservative	Annetta Powell	348	10.9	–9.6
Conservative	Satinder Dunn	336	10.5	–10.0
Conservative	Kimberly Goddard	329	10.3	–10.2
Liberal Democrats	Sam Richardson	230	7.2	+2.2
Turnout		3,358	32.5	+8.8
Registered electors		10,337		
Reform gain from Green				
Reform gain from Labour				
Reform gain from Labour				

=== Friar Park & Stone Cross ===
Friar Park & Stone Cross (3 seats)
Party	Candidate	Votes	%
Reform	Nick Fawcett	1,671	56.1
Reform	Lisa Weaver	1,598	53.7
Reform	Jack Sabharwal	1,574	52.9
Labour	Simon Hackett*	829	27.8
Labour	Terry Fitzgerald*	688	23.1
Labour	Elizabeth Giles*	674	22.6
Conservative	Paul Barnfield	439	14.7
Conservative	Dennis Oba	312	10.5
Green	Amy Pittaway	303	10.2
Green	Nita Leyshon	280	9.4
Conservative	Agnieszca Wojtowicz	274	9.2
Green	Cameron Robinson-Perry	253	8.5
Yeshua	Colin Rankine	38	1.3
Turnout		3,141	31.7
Registered electors		9,921	
Reform win (new seat)			
Reform win (new seat)			
Reform win (new seat)			

=== Great Barr, Tamebridge & Yew Tree ===
Great Barr, Tamebridge & Yew Tree
Party	Candidate	Votes	%
Labour	Connor Horton*	1,489	40.0
Labour	Kay Allcock*	1,353	36.3
Reform	Margaret Sutton	1,276	34.3
Reform	Ray Darby	1,258	33.8
Reform	Darren Harding	1,219	32.7
Labour	Mazhar Hussain	1,108	29.8
Conservative	Adrian Jones	598	16.1
Green	Vik Chandla	503	13.5
Conservative	Jaroslaw Cwik	471	12.6
Green	Debi Hayward	458	12.3
Conservative	Michal Lorek	418	11.2
Green	Frank Emukperuo	402	10.8
Liberal Democrats	Mark Smith	335	9.0
Liberal Democrats	Hoque Akramul	282	7.6
Turnout		3,942	40.1
Registered electors		9,832	
Labour win (new seat)			
Labour win (new seat)			
Reform win (new seat)			

=== Great Bridge ===
Great Bridge (3 seats)
Party	Candidate	Votes	%	±%
Reform	Keith Edge	1,591	50.6	+41.4
Reform	Mark Webb	1,409	44.8	+35.6
Reform	Brad Simms	1,380	43.9	+34.7
Labour	Kartar Singh Dosanjh	843	26.8	–11.0
Green	Will Gill*	836	26.6	+20.3
Labour	Sahdaish Kaur Pall*	724	23.0	–14.8
Labour	Soyfur Rahman*	680	21.6	–16.2
Green	Joe Cogavin	621	19.7	+13.4
Green	Naseer Hussain	610	19.4	+13.1
Conservative	Aaron Emms	283	9.0	–37.7
Conservative	Parveen Ahkter	273	8.7	–38.0
Conservative	Shahid Mahmood	183	5.8	–40.9
Turnout		3,460	32.5	+4.2
Registered electors		10,647		
Reform gain from Labour				
Reform gain from Labour				
Reform gain from Green				

=== Greets Green & Lyng ===
Greets Green & Lyng (3 seats)
Party	Candidate	Votes	%	±%
Labour	Mohammed Ahad	1,597	53.4	–13.8
Labour	Pam Randhawa*	1,359	45.5	–21.7
Labour	Jackie Taylor*	1,356	45.4	–21.8
Reform	Paul Green	805	26.9	+19.1
Reform	Mark McDermott	773	25.9	+18.1
Reform	Mike Stanyer	760	25.4	+17.6
Green	Laura Curtis	484	16.2	+5.9
Green	Mohammed Hussain	480	16.1	+5.8
Green	Renee Collins	460	15.4	+5.1
Conservative	Patrycja Suchenek	245	8.2	–6.5
Conservative	Dagmara Wojtowicz	229	7.7	–7.0
Liberal Democrats	Balbir Singh Negi	215	7.2	N/A
Conservative	Patryk Wojtowicz	203	6.8	–7.9
Turnout		3,246	35.6	+4.8
Registered electors		9,130		
Labour hold				
Labour hold				
Labour hold				

=== Hateley Heath ===
Hateley Heath
Party	Candidate	Votes	%	±%
Labour	Paul Moore*	1,266	44.8	–22.1
Labour	Amardeep Singh*	1,166	41.3	–25.7
Reform	Stephen Fellows	1,127	39.9	+28.8
Reform	Dave Moore	1,088	38.5	+27.4
Labour	Jayne Wilkinson	1,073	38.0	–28.9
Reform	Doug Perry	1,062	37.6	+26.5
Green	Theresa Millard	336	11.9	N/A
Green	Sunitha Soni	282	10.0	N/A
Conservative	Dorota Cwik	268	9.5	–7.6
Conservative	Susan Gollins	266	9.4	–7.7
Green	Liegha Taylor	255	9.0	N/A
Conservative	Ram Sarup	211	7.5	–9.6
Liberal Democrats	Martin Roebuck	80	2.8	–2.1
Turnout		3,056	32.3	+7.3
Registered electors		9,452		
Labour hold				
Labour hold				
Reform gain from Labour				

=== Hill Top ===
Hill Top (3 seats)
Party	Candidate	Votes	%
Reform	Dean Hollowood	1,381	46.3
Reform	Amaan Husen	1,193	40.0
Reform	Aaron Khuttan	1,183	39.7
Labour	Jenny Chidley*	1,067	35.8
Labour	Kulwant Singh Uppal*	1,013	34.0
Labour	Skerntian Keri	884	29.7
Conservative	Steve Simcox	391	13.1
Green	Zach Bates	385	12.9
Conservative	Rohan Lal	365	12.2
Green	Olivia Shaw	345	11.6
Conservative	Oskar Wojtowicz	275	9.2
Green	Al Imon Mohammed	270	9.1
Liberal Democrats	Manjit Singh Lall	191	6.4
Turnout		3,281	33.8
Registered electors		9,707	
Reform win (new seat)			
Reform win (new seat)			
Reform win (new seat)			

=== Langley ===
Langley (3 seats)
Party	Candidate	Votes	%	±%
Reform	Pete Durnell	1,450	43.6	+30.1
Reform	Paul Leavey	1,382	41.5	+28.0
Reform	Tuli Zefi	1,246	37.4	+23.9
Labour	Caroline Owen*	992	29.8	–36.1
Labour	Jill Tromans*	948	28.5	–37.4
Labour	Nadia Iqbal	935	28.1	–37.8
Green	Eve Batten	614	18.4	N/A
Green	James Deans	550	16.5	N/A
Green	Sarah Deans	533	16.0	N/A
Conservative	Sandra Collinge	463	13.9	–6.7
Conservative	Izabela Blaszczak	367	11.0	–9.6
Conservative	Krzysztof Wojtowicz	300	9.0	–11.6
Liberal Democrats	Dheeraj Singh Rawat	205	6.2	N/A
Turnout		3,551	33.2	+8.5
Registered electors		10,713		
Reform gain from Labour				
Reform gain from Labour				
Reform gain from Labour				

=== Newton & Valley ===
Newton & Valley (3 seats)
Party	Candidate	Votes	%
Labour	Keith Allcock*	1,311	40.0
Reform	Kenny Jinks	1,073	32.8
Labour	Elaine Giles*	1,068	32.6
Reform	Rob Williams	1,053	32.2
Reform	Tarjinder Singh Bassi	1,029	31.4
Labour	Saj Ashraf*	1,021	31.2
Green	Liam Emanuel	548	16.7
Green	Jeremy Parker	533	16.3
Green	Tiffany Sims	519	15.9
Conservative	Roman Lal	421	12.9
Conservative	Ewa Lorek	371	11.3
Conservative	Alina Mazur	318	9.7
Liberal Democrats	Amanda Jenkins	300	9.2
Liberal Democrats	Daljit Kaur	256	7.8
Turnout		3,544	36.4
Registered electors		9,725	
Labour win (new seat)			
Reform win (new seat)			
Labour win (new seat)			

=== Old Warley ===
Old Warley (3 seats)
Party	Candidate	Votes	%	±%
Reform	Karl Leech	1,379	39.4	+28.8
Reform	Connor Marshall	1,376	39.3	+28.7
Labour	Luke Cotterill*	1,288	36.8	–14.6
Labour	Harnoor Bhullar*	1,206	34.4	–17.0
Reform	Baljinder Singh	1,201	34.3	+23.7
Labour	Chippie Kalebe-Nyamongo*	1,036	29.6	–21.8
Green	Mark Holdroyd	596	17.0	+7.9
Green	Tanisha Reid	559	16.0	+6.9
Conservative	Eric Dawes	501	14.3	–8.3
Green	Mohammed Miah	468	13.4	+4.3
Conservative	Aleksandra Rokita	324	9.2	–13.4
Conservative	Katarzyna Sikora	320	9.1	–13.5
Liberal Democrats	Bob Smith	258	7.4	+1.0
Turnout		3,735	39.6	+9.2
Registered electors		9,427		
Reform gain from Labour				
Reform gain from Labour				
Labour hold				

=== Oldbury ===
Oldbury (3 seats)
Party	Candidate	Votes	%	±%
Labour	Nagi Daya Singh*	1,177	44.6	–13.9
Labour	Suzanne Hartwell*	1,105	41.9	–16.6
Labour	Rizwan Jalil*	1,089	41.3	–17.2
Reform	Stuart Hill	767	29.1	N/A
Reform	Rita Randell	745	28.3	N/A
Reform	Andrew Such	730	27.7	N/A
Green	Jake Cree	486	18.4	+11.6
Green	Andy Dangerfield	452	17.1	+10.3
Green	Thomas Gerrish	403	15.3	+8.5
Conservative	Amit Amit	387	14.7	–3.1
Conservative	Daniel Marquez	306	11.6	–6.2
Conservative	Shazia Khan	262	9.9	–7.9
Turnout		2,850	32.2	+3.4
Registered electors		8,845		
Labour hold				
Labour hold				
Labour hold				

=== Princes End ===
Princes End (3 seats)
Party	Candidate	Votes	%	±%
Reform	Gary Dale	1,569	57.6	+44.3
Reform	Neil Shirvington	1,472	54.0	+40.7
Reform	Geoffrey Sutton	1,394	51.2	+37.9
Labour	Archer Williams*	687	25.2	–21.5
Labour	Geoff Deakin	562	20.6	–26.1
Conservative	Kelly Cranston	486	17.8	–19.6
Labour	Joanna Quaye	450	16.5	–30.2
Conservative	Justyna Kordala*	345	12.7	–24.7
Green	Helen Broome	298	10.9	+8.3
Conservative	Natalie Weston	280	10.3	–27.1
Green	Shareen Khan	197	7.2	+4.6
Green	Seona Deuchar	192	7.0	+4.4
Liberal Democrats	Chandra Sharma	126	4.6	N/A
Advance UK	David Wilkes*	113	4.1	N/A
Turnout		2,919	29.6	+7.6
Registered electors		10,045		
Reform gain from Conservative				
Reform gain from Advance UK				
Reform gain from Labour				

=== Rowley ===
Rowley (3 seats)
Party	Candidate	Votes	%	±%
Reform	Paul Tromans	1,677	52.8	+37.6
Reform	Ritchie Massey	1,616	50.9	+35.7
Reform	Jeet Taheem	1,402	44.2	+29.0
Labour	Sohail Iqbal*	945	29.8	–17.1
Labour	Khayam Khan*	871	27.4	–19.5
Labour	Desta Harris	852	26.8	–20.1
Conservative	Kelly Burton	458	14.4	–6.0
Green	Eva Echo	401	12.6	+6.6
Green	Benjamin Morris	350	11.0	+5.0
Green	Joseph Loudon	339	10.7	+4.7
Conservative	Sharnjit Kaur	326	10.3	–10.1
Conservative	Ryan Lal	284	8.9	–11.5
Turnout		3,426	34.0	+10.2
Registered electors		10,085		
Reform gain from Labour				
Reform gain from Labour				
Reform gain from Labour				

=== Smethwick ===
Smethwick (3 seats)
Party	Candidate	Votes	%	±%
Labour	Parbinder Kaur*	1,339	49.5	–18.7
Labour	Luke John Davies*	1,298	47.9	–20.3
Labour	Ash Lewis*	1,182	43.7	–24.5
Green	Keiran Diver	673	24.9	+13.4
Green	Mark Redding	642	23.7	+12.2
Reform	Simran Kaur	605	22.3	N/A
Reform	Mamta Bhardwaj	603	22.3	N/A
Green	Kez Sleeman	593	21.9	+10.4
Reform	Dwayne McQuaid	570	21.1	N/A
Conservative	Harjindar Kaur Marwaha	239	8.8	–6.1
Conservative	Ann Wylie	192	7.1	–7.8
Conservative	Tarlochan Sunner	185	6.8	–8.1
Turnout		2,993	30.8	–0.3
Registered electors		9,728		
Labour hold				
Labour hold				
Labour hold				

=== Soho & Victoria ===
Soho & Victoria (3 seats)
Party	Candidate	Votes	%	±%
Labour	Ragih Muflihi*	1,304	55.3	–14.8
Labour	Farut Shaeen*	1,275	54.1	–16.0
Labour	Mohammed Jalal Uddin*	1,232	52.2	–17.9
Green	Andrea Boxall	676	28.7	+14.9
Green	Erin Lewis	613	26.0	+12.2
Green	Stefan Smith	581	24.6	+10.8
Reform	Christopher Clemson	260	11.0	N/A
Conservative	Susan Neale	258	10.9	+0.2
Reform	David Jones	254	10.8	N/A
Reform	Les Smith	220	9.3	N/A
Conservative	Jolanta Obcowska-Sarup	203	8.6	–2.1
Conservative	Leslie Trumpeter	200	8.5	–2.2
Turnout		2,569	28.0	–1.2
Registered electors		9,174		
Labour hold				
Labour hold				
Labour hold				

=== St Pauls ===
St Pauls (3 seats)
Party	Candidate	Votes	%	±%
Labour	Aqeela Choudhry*	1,745	60.6	–23.4
Labour	Abid Hussain	1,650	57.3	–26.7
Labour	Charn Singh Padda	1,620	56.3	–27.7
Green	Owais Sajed Khan	646	22.4	N/A
Green	Kevin Priest	517	18.0	N/A
Independent	Sukhbir Singh Gill	474	16.5	N/A
Green	Kenan Taylor	462	16.0	N/A
Reform	Steven Finch	301	10.5	N/A
Reform	Mark Pilkington	242	8.4	N/A
Reform	Lynne Tomkinson	226	7.9	N/A
Conservative	Shirley Johnson	224	7.8	–8.2
TUSC	Jay Singh	214	7.4	N/A
Conservative	Anna Misiewicz	180	6.3	–9.7
Conservative	Krzysztof Misiewicz	135	4.7	–11.3
Turnout		3,229	34.3	–0.9
Registered electors		9,421		
Labour hold				
Labour hold				
Labour hold				

=== Tipton Green ===
Tipton Green (3 seats)
Party	Candidate	Votes	%	±%
Independent	Richard Jeffcoat*	1,443	41.7	–9.5
Reform	Tim Hordley	1,386	40.1	N/A
Reform	Matt Lloyd	1,345	38.9	N/A
Labour	Syeda Khatun*	1,101	31.8	–6.7
Labour	Khurshid Haque	1,007	29.1	–9.4
Reform	Abdul Husen	956	27.6	N/A
Labour	Nahid Iqbal	893	25.8	–12.7
Green	Raven Dixon-Biggs	554	16.0	N/A
Green	Prabhkin Kaur Bhullar	535	15.5	N/A
Green	Aldo Mussi	355	10.3	N/A
Conservative	Tom Lewandowski	293	8.5	–1.8
Conservative	Katarzyna Dobosz	261	7.5	–2.8
Conservative	Manjit Singh	247	7.1	–3.2
Turnout		3,886	38.7	+8.1
Registered electors		10,038		
Independent hold				
Reform gain from Labour				
Reform gain from Labour				

=== Tividale ===
Tividale (3 seats)
Party	Candidate	Votes	%	±%
Reform	Ken Parsons	1,366	43.9	+31.8
Labour	Maria Crompton*	1,338	43.0	–16.2
Reform	Lou Yates	1,280	41.2	+29.1
Reform	Coleen Sheehan	1,267	40.8	+28.7
Labour	Altaf Hussain	1,025	33.0	–26.2
Labour	Ritu Sharma	1,022	32.9	–26.3
Green	Mark Byrne	428	13.8	N/A
Green	Robin Diver	381	12.3	N/A
Green	James Munoz	307	9.9	N/A
Conservative	Libbi Tudor	297	9.6	–13.4
Conservative	Jasbir Ranie	253	8.1	–14.9
Conservative	Jacek Wojtowicz	214	6.9	–16.1
Liberal Democrats	Palwinder Singh	148	4.8	–0.9
Turnout		3,330	34.7	+10.7
Registered electors		9,592		
Reform gain from Labour				
Labour hold				
Reform gain from Conservative				

=== Wednesbury ===
Wednesbury (3 seats)
Party	Candidate	Votes	%
Reform	Jeremy Handley	1,777	51.3
Reform	Owen Nelson	1,714	49.5
Reform	Paul Snape	1,659	47.9
Labour	Luke Giles*	850	24.5
Labour	Peter Hughes*	823	23.8
Labour	Nicola Maycock*	786	22.7
Green	Mohammed All-Hasan	563	16.3
Green	Eve Ward	440	12.7
Green	Jai Kaur Sandhu	411	11.9
Conservative	George Okpako	298	8.6
Conservative	Evelyn Pessu	293	8.5
Conservative	Rafiullah Mohammadzai	279	8.1
Liberal Democrats	Richard Jones	206	5.9
Liberal Democrats	Richard McVittie	188	5.4
Independent	Gina Patel	106	3.1
Turnout		3,644	34.3
Registered electors		10,637	
Reform win (new seat)			
Reform win (new seat)			
Reform win (new seat)			

=== West Bromwich Central ===
West Bromwich Central
Party	Candidate	Votes	%	±%
Labour	Tirath Singh Dhatt*	1,371	52.1	–1.5
Labour	Liam Preece*	1,221	46.4	–7.2
Labour	Harpal Kaur Tiwana	1,197	45.5	–8.1
Reform	Chris George	586	22.3	+14.6
Reform	Sue Taylor	534	20.3	+12.6
Reform	Gaynor Summan	511	19.4	+11.7
Green	Oluwadamilola Amoo	483	18.3	+11.7
Conservative	Sarah James	423	16.1	+2.5
Green	Nikhwat Marawat	417	15.8	+9.2
Green	Kristopher Sarabadu	384	14.6	+8.0
Conservative	Anne-Marie Wright	319	12.1	–1.5
Conservative	Suzanna Narojczyk	301	11.4	–2.2
Independent	Daria Gorczynska	150	5.7	–7.3
Turnout		2,880	31.9	–1.2
Registered electors		9,026		
Labour hold				
Labour hold				
Labour hold				
