= Mark Grundy =

English educator

Sir Mark Grundy is an English educationalist. He is the former CEO and former headteacher of Shireland Collegiate Academy in Smethwick, England. He was knighted in 2006 for his work at both Shireland and George Salter Academy in West Bromwich, as well as his work in ICT.

He oversaw an improvement in GCSE grades at George Salter Academy from 15% of children achieving five A*-C grades in 2003 to 56% in 2005.
