= Friar Park, West Midlands =

Coordinates: 52.552°N 1.988°W

Friar Park
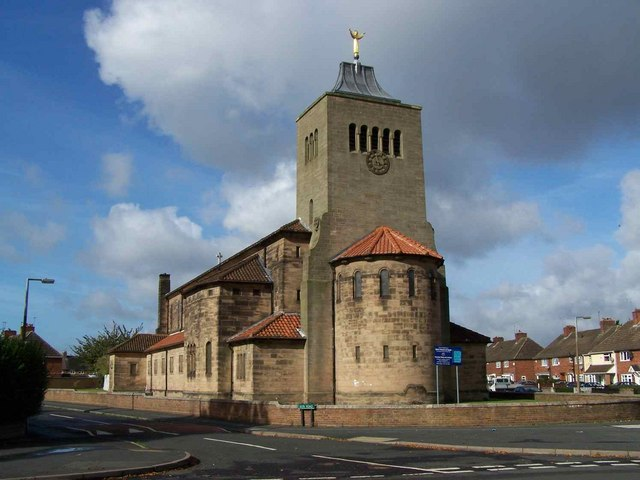
- St Francis of Assisi Church

- Location within the West Midlands
- Metropolitan borough: Sandwell
- Metropolitan county: West Midlands
- Region: West Midlands
- Country: England
- Sovereign state: United Kingdom
- Post town: WEDNESBURY
- Postcode district: WS10
- Dialling code: 0121
- Police: West Midlands
- Fire: West Midlands
- Ambulance: West Midlands
- UK Parliament: Tipton and Wednesbury

Friar Park is a residential area of Wednesbury, in the Sandwell district, in the county of the West Midlands, England. It is also a ward of Sandwell Council.

== Origins ==
Originally in the borough of West Bromwich, it was developed by West Bromwich council in the late 1920s and early 1930s to rehouse families from town centre slum clearances. It is situated approximately one mile to the east of Wednesbury town centre and two miles to the north of West Bromwich town centre. Since the 1960s, it has been located near to the M6 motorway.

When the borough of West Bromwich was expanded in 1966 to include the former urban district of Wednesbury, Friar Park was placed within the boundaries of the Wednesbury township and has remained part of it ever since. However, an opposite reorganization took place in neighbouring Hateley Heath, which had previously straddled the borders of Wednesbury and West Bromwich, but now exists entirely within West Bromwich.

== Amenities ==
There have been some more recent additions to the estate, including Carisbrooke House multi storey council flats, that were built in the 1960s on the north-east of the estate. However, these flats were demolished in 2001 in a controlled explosion, one of many tower blocks in the West Midlands which have been demolished since the 1980s. The low-rise blocks of council flats in Friardale Close, which were built in the 1960s, were demolished in 2004. Over the years, the council has decided to modernise the older houses, which form the nucleus of the estate, rather than to opt for demolition. In the 1980s, a small development of houses and flats was built off Carisbrooke Road, on land adjacent to the Tame Valley Canal.

Joseph Edward Cox Infant and Junior Schools were built on the estate around 1930, to serve 5–11-year olds. The children were initially located in temporary buildings, before a permanent junior school opened in 1934 and an infant school in 1936. The schools have been completely rebuilt since the beginning of the 21st century and the name changed to The Priory Primary School.

The Coronation public house was demolished in the 1990s and a Lidl supermarket now stands on the site. Most of the estate's shops around Carrington Road were demolished between 2010 and 2016 after standing empty since the 1990s.

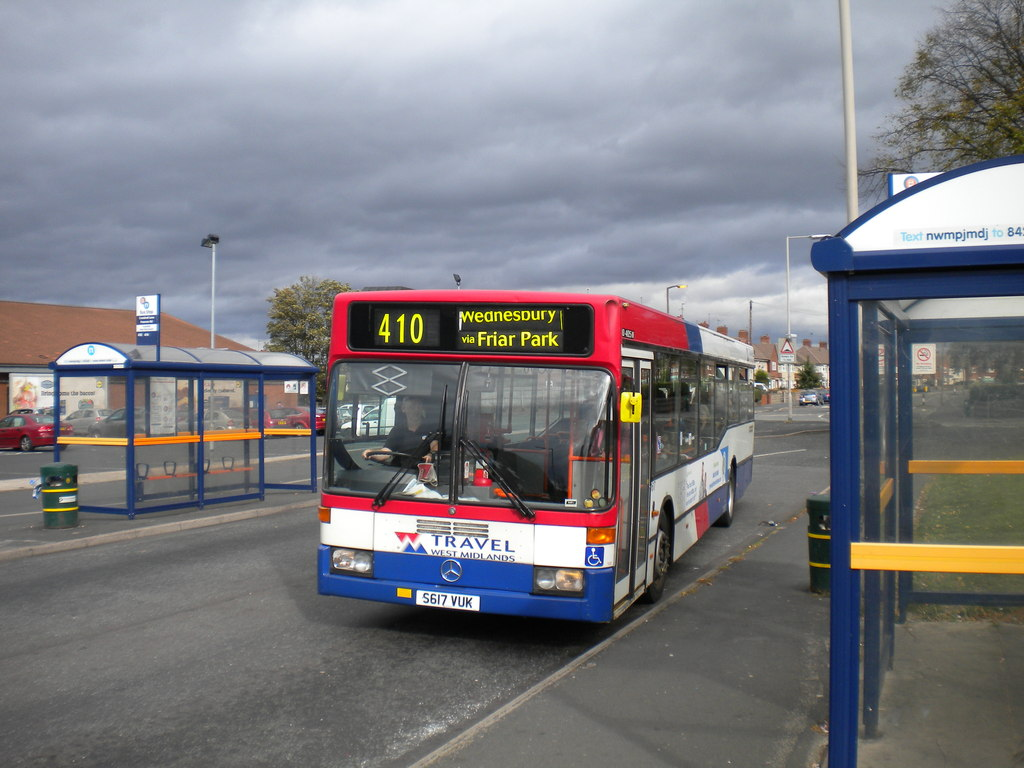
A bus in Friar Park.

Bus route 40 connects Friar Park to Wednesbury and West Bromwich and is jointly operated by National Express West Midlands and Diamond Bus as West Midlands Bus. Also bus route 41 connects Friar Park to West Bromwich via Hateley Heath and Carters Green and is solely operated by Diamond bus (Carolean Coaches from 5 January 2025).

During the middle of December 2022 the local convenience store Lally's suffered flooding resulting in the shop been closed for almost four months while repairs where carried out.

== Sociology ==
A tragedy struck the estate on 21 December 1977, when a house in School Road caught fire. The fire took place during a national firefighters strike, and the Auxiliary Fire Service had to deal with the emergency call. The occupant of the house, 31-year-old Mrs Maureen Brazier, managed to escape the fire, but her four children Denise (aged 12), Suzanne (aged 10), Lisa (aged 6) and Tony (aged 4) were trapped inside and burnt to death, despite the efforts to save them by the Auxiliary Fire Service, as well as several neighbours, including one man who attempted to tackle the blaze with a garden hose. Mrs Brazier was later rehoused at another council property nearby, where she lived until her death in September 2013. The house in School Road was demolished in 1978, leaving a gap in the middle of the terrace where it once stood.

Unemployment rates in Friar Park have constantly been above the national average. the residential area was built during the Great Depression, and it had to endure another major economic blow in 1980, when the nearby Patent Shaft steelworks closed. Many other local factories were closed around the same time, as a result of the early 1980s recession. This coincided with a rise in crime and a host of other social problems on the estate during the 1980s.

At the time of the 2001 census, it was reported that unemployment in Friar Park stood at 9.9% – more than double the national average and slightly above the average for Sandwell. It rose again in 2008 and 2009, due to another recession, although, by 2014, unemployment in the area was falling.

The Coronation public house was the scene of regular violence and drug dealing, until its closure and demolition around 1990. A Lidl supermarket was later built on the site.

Joyriding was also a major problem in the 1980s and 1990s, but has since fallen, with traffic calming measures on Carrington Road having contributed to a fall in speed-related accidents.

== Cultural references ==
Rap group Credit to the Nation filmed the video for their 1994 hit Sowing the Seeds of Hatred at various locations on the Friar Park estate, as well as on a bridge over the Tame Valley Canal near to the estate. Carisbrooke House multi-storey flats and the maisonettes which stood nearby were seen in the video, several years before they were demolished.
