= Defunct schools in Sandwell =

Former schools in Sandwell, West Midlands, England

This article details a number of defunct schools that were once located in Sandwell in the West Midlands of England. For details of currently operating schools in Sandwell, please see: List of schools in Sandwell.

== Albright Secondary Modern School ==
Albright Secondary Modern School was a secondary modern school situated in Oldbury, Worcestershire (now West Midlands), England.

It was built in the 1930s and named after local manufacturer Albright and Wilson. The school buildings were situated on Pope's Lane to the south of the town centre.

The school's name changed in September 1974 – the same year that Sandwell was created from the merger of Warley with West Bromwich – when it gained comprehensive status and became Albright High School. However, this arrangement only lasted for nine years, as the school closed in July 1983 on a merger with nearby Oldbury High School to form Langley High School, which in turn closed 24 years later on a merger with Warley High School to form Oldbury College of Sport (now Oldbury Academy).

The Albright school buildings remain in use as a community facility.

52.50093°N 2.00391°W

== Britannia High School ==
Britannia High School was a secondary school located in Rowley Regis, West Midlands, England.

It was opened in 1932 as Rowley Regis Secondary Modern Boys School and later became a mixed school with the title Britannia High School.

Plans to close the school were first drawn up in 2001, but these were initially shelved in July of that year after a re-think by Sandwell council officials. Council officials changed their mind the following year, with all but the oldest pupils being transferred to Heathfield Foundation Technology College for the 2002-2003 academic year. However, the 2001-2002 Year 10 pupils were allowed to remain at Britannia in order to complete their GCSE studies, before the school closed completely in July 2003. The school buildings were demolished in 2004 and the site is now occupied by the new Blackheath Primary School.

The school featured in an edition of On The Record, the BBC's flagship political TV programme, in 1989.

== Hill Top High School ==
Hill Top High School was a secondary school located in West Bromwich, West Midlands (formerly Staffordshire), England.

It opened in 1911 as Hill Top Council School, incorporating infant, junior and secondary departments, on the corner of Hill Top and Coles Lane. The buildings were enlarged in 1914 to take in extra pupils.

Part of the school was damaged by the Luftwaffe during the Second World War. The infant school relocated to a site of the new Hateley Heath housing estate in 1950, with the juniors following in 1952, leaving only the secondary school pupils at Hill Top.

The schools status changed from secondary modern to comprehensive in 1969, when it took on the title of Hill Top High School.

By the late 1980s, numbers on the school roll were falling and Sandwell council decided that it was no longer viable and would have to close.

The final intake of 11-year-old pupils started at Hill Top in September 1989, with youngest two year groups transferring to Wodensborough Community Technology College after the end of the academic year in July 1990. The oldest two year groups in the school were allowed to remain at Hill Top until it closed completely in July 1992

The school buildings were then demolished and replaced by housing

52.54°N 2.01°W

== Park Lane Secondary Modern School ==
Park Lane Secondary Modern School was a secondary school located in Tipton, Staffordshire (now West Midlands), England.

It was the last of seven schools to be opened by Tipton School Board, which was formed in 1871. The foundation for the school was laid on 20 May 1903 by the chairman, Mr Atkins Hinton. It was opened the following year as two single sex schools for children aged 11 upwards.

After 65 years, it closed in July 1969 on a merger with Tipton Grammar School to form Alexandra High School and Sixth Form Centre (a comprehensive school), but the buildings remained in use for the youngest three year groups in the new school. By the early 1980s, however, extensions were added to the main Alexandra site on Alexandra Road which meant that the younger pupils only used the Park Lane buildings (by this stage in a deteriorating condition) on a part-time basis. The Park Lane site closed completely in July 1990, ending 86 years of education at the site, and it was demolished the following year.

Victoria Infant School was opened on the site in September 1995 to replace Manor Road Infant School.

== Rowley Regis Grammar School ==
Rowley Regis Grammar School was a grammar school situated in Rowley Regis, West Midlands (formerly Staffordshire), England.

The school started life in Wrights Lane, Old Hill using the old Victorian premises used by the local Central School. It became a Grammar School in 1948. After persistent lobbying particularly by the headmaster Mr George Lloyd that the premises were unfit for a Grammar school, a new school was built at a site on Hawes Lane in Rowley Regis and opened in September 1962, providing education for pupils aged 11 to 18 years. It remained opened for 13 years until Sandwell Council decided to close it in July 1975, as part of a local phasing-out scheme of grammar schools in favour of comprehensive schools.

After closing as a grammar school, it became a sixth-form college; then Dudley College took it over in September 2001—although this arrangement only lasted for three years, and in early 2008 the buildings were demolished.

The new St Michael's Church of England High School opened on the site in September 2011 to replace the existing buildings on Throne Road, which were later demolished.

52.4934°N 2.0386°W

== Warley High School ==
Warley High School was a secondary school located in Oldbury, West Midlands (formerly Worcestershire), England. The school was granted Sports College specialist status.

It opened in 1930 as the Junior Technical School, later becoming Oldbury Technical School, moving from the Flash Road site, a type of school that bridged the gap between secondary modern and grammar schools and was very focused on the teaching of technology.

The head teacher was Mr Bullerwell and the deputy head was Mr Thompson. There was also a sixth-form centre, which survived the name change in September 1975 but closed during the 1980s following a rise in the popularity of sixth-form colleges such as Halesowen College.

The school's best-known former pupil is television comedian Frank Skinner, who attended between 1968 and 1973 when it was still Oldbury Technical School.

The school merged with Langley High School (formerly Oldbury Grammar School) during the 2006–2007 academic year to form Oldbury College of Sport, with a lower and higher school site, and a new school is to be built on the upper school site. The new school opened its doors early in January 2007, at the beginning of the Spring term.

The school made the headlines for all the wrong reasons in February 2007 when teacher Kenneth Paskin, 59, was found guilty of sexual offences against a 13-year-old girl who had been placed in his care some time earlier. Mr Paskin, a teacher and netball coach for some 30 years (the final nine of them at Warley) prior to his arrest, was sentenced to three years and three months in prison and put on the sex offender registry for life. The school is now known as Oldbury Academy.

52.580°N 2.010°W

== See also ==
- List of schools in Sandwell
