= Black Country Housing Group =

British social housing association

- Founded: Birmingham, England, 6 May 1974
- Type: Housing, care and support for older people
- Location: Rowley Regis, England
- Origins: Birmingham, England
- Region served: Birmingham and the Black Country, United Kingdom
- Product: Affordable housing, Retirement housing, care homes, domiciliary care, environmental consultancy
- Key people: Cllr Peter Bilson, Chairperson; Amanda Tomlinson, Chief Executive
- Revenue: £12.3m
- Employees: 200
- Website: www.bchg.co.uk

Black Country Housing Group is a registered social housing association based in Birmingham and the Black Country in the British Midlands. The organisation is responsible for the provision of affordable housing with properties in excess of 2,000 homes. These properties range from newly constructed homes to established dwellings built in the 20th Century.

== History ==
The history of Black Country Housing Group can be traced to the 1970s with the 1974 Housing Act and the formation of two competing housing associations, St Philip's Housing Society and Lotus Housing Association.

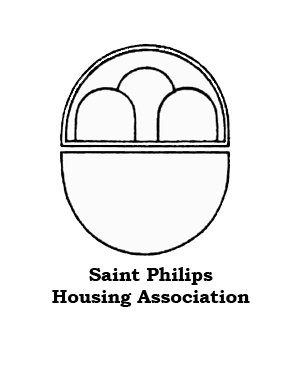
Defunct logo of Saint Philip's Housing Association now part of Black Country Housing Group

In the late 1970s and 1980s both housing associations refocused their attention on the under represented Black Country and distanced themselves from Birmingham. St. Philip's moved to Shell Corner in the Black Country first and Lotus relocated to Oldbury, West Midlands. In 1990 the two associations merged to form Black Country Housing Group.

In 2014, Black Country Housing Group's 40th anniversary has seen the organisation focus its attention to more community based activities. The company changed its mission statement to "A social business investing in people and communities" to reflect this.

In April 2014, the company was chosen as the preferred bidder by Dudley Metropolitan Borough Council to transfer New Bradley Hall Residential Home in Kingswinford which was threatened with closure to cement its commitment to the community and the people within it.

The organisation is planning an affordable housing scheme in Darlaston with 24 houses and apartments which will all be affordable. Planning consent was secured in 2021.

== Business ==
Black Country Housing Group has a variety of business which include:

- Supported housing for persons with learning difficulties
- Sheltered accommodation for the elderly
- Supported housing for young persons
- Energy consultancy
- Domiciliary care
- Home Improvement agency
- Social business and employment agency

== Governance ==
The organisation is led by a Board of Management of 12 individuals from a variety of professional and social backgrounds. The Board also has a number of tenants and volunteers that provide an insight into the services provided and help shape the business to meet their needs. The Board is chaired by Cllr Peter Bilson.

The organisation employs 200 employees as well as a small number of casual workers and volunteers.
