= Shireland Biomedical UTC =

University technical college in West Bromwich, England

Location
- 350 High Street; West Bromwich, West Midlands, B70 8DJ; United Kingdom
- Coordinates: 52.5215°N 1.9994°W

Information
- Type: University Technical College
- Established: 2015
- Department for Education URN: 141813 Tables
- Ofsted: Reports
- Principal: Gulfam Shahzad
- Age: 14 to 19
- Enrolment: 440
- Website: http://www.healthfuturesutc.co.uk

Shireland Biomedical UTC is a University Technical College in West Bromwich, England. The UTC opened in 2015 and is sponsored by the University of Wolverhampton, West Midlands Ambulance Service and Midcounties Co-operative Pharmacy.
