= Oldbury Academy =

Location
- Pound Road; Oldbury, West Midlands, B68 8NE; England
- 52.4802°N 2.0101°W

Information
- Type: Academy
- Local authority: Sandwell
- Department for Education URN: 137701 Tables
- Ofsted: Reports
- Head teacher: Barry Morley
- Gender: Mixed
- Age: 11 to 16
- Enrolment: 1341
- Website: https://oldburyacademy.com

Oldbury Academy (formerly Oldbury College of Sport) is a mixed secondary school and former sixth form located in Oldbury, West Midlands, England. It opened as a merger of Warley High School (formerly Oldbury Tech) and Langley High School (formerly Oldbury Grammar) on 1 January 1999. The head teacher, John Martin, led the merger of the two schools from 1983 until 1999. Phil Shackleton took over as head teacher until summer 2024, when he became executive head teacher for Stour Vale Academy Trust, which he had led the school into a few years earlier. Since September 2024, the school has been led by head teacher Mr. B Morley, who joined the school from Windsor Academy in Halesowen, where he was the Deputy head teacher. The school is also aiming to provide students a "nutritious" start to the day by handing out free bagels at the start of every school day, as part of the National School Breakfast Programme.

== Awards ==
The school has aimed to achieve the National Healthy Schools Award by bringing catering in-house and teaching the benefits of healthy living in lessons throughout the curriculum. As part of the school's emphasis on sports, it has been awarded funding for a School Sport Coordinator scheme. During the summer months, the school is host to West Bromwich Albion F.C. soccer camps. The school also offers numerous sporting activities throughout the year.

== Controversy ==
It was reported in June 2013 that Birmingham University lecturer, Christopher Hill, had written to Education Secretary, Michael Gove, claiming the school was offering unfair £200 'incentives' for certain pupils to gain a C grade in GCSE English and Maths at a potential cost of £10,000. Michael Gove took no action. Headmaster John Martin publicly acknowledged the scheme but put the cost at £400 for the year and hailed it a success.
