= George Salter Academy =

Location
- Davey Road; West Bromwich, West Midlands, B70 9UW; England; 52.5254°N 2.0124°W

Information
- Type: Academy
- Established: 1932
- Department for Education URN: 135234 Tables
- Ofsted: Reports
- Principal: Adrian Price
- Gender: Coeducational
- Age: 11 to 16
- Enrolment: 1278
- Website: https://www.georgesalter.com/

George Salter Academy is a coeducational 11-16 secondary school with academy status situated in West Bromwich, West Midlands, England. There are currently around 914 pupils on roll. Almost 50% of its pupils are from minority ethnic backgrounds representing over 20 nationalities, mostly from within the Indian Sub-Continent and the Caribbean.

The school has academy status under the sponsorship of the Ormiston Academies Trust. Since this status was gained in 2007 GCSE exam results have improved substantially. In 2009, 39% of GCSE students gained five or more GCSEs at grades A*-C, placing it as the third highest ranking secondary school in Sandwell.

The school originally opened in 1932 as a secondary modern school for children aged 11 and upwards, replacing a 19th-century senior school in the Great Bridge district just over West Bromwich's border in Tipton.

The former headteacher Mark Grundy was knighted for his work improving standards at the school; he oversaw an improvement in GCSE grades from 15% of children achieving five A*-C grades in 2003 to 56% in 2005.
