= Oldbury, West Midlands =

Town in West Midlands, England

Coordinates: 52.505°N 2.0159°W

Oldbury
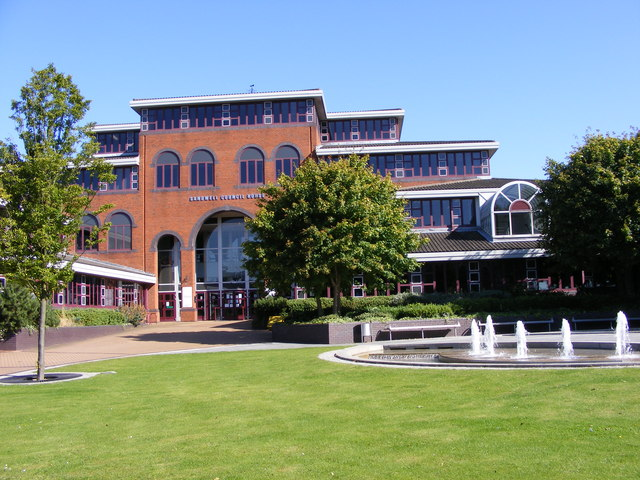
- Sandwell Council House in Oldbury

- Location within the West Midlands
- Population: 25,488 (Built-up area subdivision); 13,606 (Ward)
- OS grid reference: SO989897
- Metropolitan borough: Sandwell
- Metropolitan county: West Midlands
- Region: West Midlands
- Country: England
- Sovereign state: United Kingdom
- Areas of the town: List: Brandhall; Bristnall; Bristnall Fields; Causeway Green; Langley Green; Londonderry; Oldbury (Old); Old Warley; Rood End
- Post town: OLDBURY
- Postcode district: B68, B69
- Dialling code: 0121
- Police: West Midlands
- Fire: West Midlands
- Ambulance: West Midlands
- UK Parliament: West Bromwich

Oldbury is a market town in the metropolitan borough of Sandwell, in the county of the West Midlands, England. It is the administrative centre of the borough. At the 2011 census, the town had a population of 13,606, while the 2017 population of the wider built-up area was estimated at 25,488. Sandwell Metropolitan Borough Council, which defines Oldbury Town as consisting of the wards of Bristnall, Langley, Oldbury, and Old Warley, gave the population as 50,641 in 2011.

== Etymology ==
The place name Oldbury comes from the Old English 'Ealdenbyrig', – signifying that Oldbury was old even in early English times over 1,000 years ago. Eald being Old English for 'old', Byrig is the plural of 'burh' in Old English – a burh being a fortification or fortified town.

== History ==
Oldbury was part of the ancient parish of Halesowen, a detached part of Shropshire surrounded by Worcestershire and Staffordshire. After the dissolution of the monasteries, Henry VIII gave Hales Owen manor including Oldbury to Sir John Dudley. In 1555, Sir John's son Robert sold most of Hales Owen manor but retained Oldbury and Langley which became a separate manor. Thus Sir Robert Dudley became the first Lord of the Manor of Oldbury. Oldbury manor was held by several families thereafter with the land gradually being sold off and the manorial functions dispersed. The last Lord of Oldbury Manor was Patrick Allan Fraser.

Pigot and Co.'s National Commercial Directory for 1828-9 describes Oldbury as a village in Shropshire with close trade and manufacturing links to Dudley and Stourbridge. It notes the importance of the iron trade with its "considerable blast furnaces, for making pig iron" and states "there are also steel works; and coal and iron-stone abound in the vicinity". Mention is made of a debtors' prison, and a court-house which held a fortnightly Court of Requests for recovery of debts not exceeding five pounds.

The first branch of Lloyds Bank was opened in Oldbury in 1864. The branch was founded to serve fellow Quakers Arthur Albright and John Wilson's local chemical factory. The original building survives, but the Lloyds bank branch closed around 2005.

== Local government ==
The old Municipal Buildings

By the Counties (Detached Parts) Act 1844, Oldbury was reincorporated into Worcestershire after a nine-hundred-year absence.

Coat of arms of the former Municipal Borough of Oldbury

Oldbury was formerly a township and chapelry in the parish of Halesowen, in 1866 Oldbury became a separate civil parish, in 1894, Oldbury became an Urban District, based at the Municipal Buildings and in 1935 the area gained Municipal Borough-status. Oldbury council built several thousand houses, flats and bungalows for 40 years from 1893 until its disbandment, the 1,000th of which was completed in 1933 at Wallace Road near the border with Rowley Regis. On 1 April 1966 the district was abolished and merged with the County Borough of Smethwick and the Municipal Borough of Rowley Regis to form the County Borough of Warley, part also went to the Municipal Borough of Halesowen and the County Borough of West Bromwich. The parish was also abolished on 1 April 1966 to form Warley, part also went to Halesowen and West Bromwich. In 1961 the parish had a population of 53,948.

In 1974, Oldbury became part of the new Sandwell Metropolitan Borough (a merger between the county boroughs of West Bromwich and Warley), and was transferred from Worcestershire into the new West Midlands Metropolitan County. Since 1986, after the abolition of the West Midlands County Council, Sandwell effectively became a unitary authority. Sandwell Council's headquarters are in Oldbury town centre.

== Industry and commerce ==
The town has seen a large expansion in retail since 1980. In October 1980, J Sainsbury opened one of its first SavaCentre hypermarkets in Oldbury town centre. Twenty years later, it was rebranded as a traditional Sainsbury's store as the SavaCentre side of the business was phased out. A Toys "R" Us superstore at Birchley Island opened in October 1988 but the retail chain went out of business in 2018. Oldbury Green Retail Park was built next to the town's ring road in the mid-1990s. Homebase relocated there from its 1980s purpose-built store, which Gala Bingo subsequently took over.

Due to the socio-economics of Sandwell, the area has a number of social housing organisations such as Black Country Housing Group which has been operating in Sandwell since its relocation from Birmingham in the 1980s.

In October 2013, the commercial radio station Free Radio moved its local operations for the Black Country and Shropshire from Wolverhampton to new studios at Black Country House.

The town has retained a prominence in the chemical industry, with major works still located at Rood End and Langley Green (formerly Albright and Wilson); as well as several smaller sites nearer to the town centre.

== Transport links ==
=== Rail ===
For over thirty years, there were three railway stations in the parish with the name Oldbury; only one is still open, but under a new name. The surviving one, on the Stour Valley Line at Bromford Road, has existed since the 1850s. It was originally called Oldbury & Bromford Lane, then Oldbury, and since 1984, Sandwell & Dudley.

The second nearest railway station to the centre of Oldbury is Langley Green on the Stourbridge Extension Line, now the Birmingham to Worcester via Kidderminster Line. It opened in April 1867 and was originally called Langley Green & Rood End, until a short half-mile long branch line, the Oldbury Railway, was linked to the station with its own (third) platform; this opened in November 1884 and the station was renamed Oldbury & Langley Green. The Oldbury Railway, which also linked to Albright and Wilson, had both a passenger station, named Oldbury, on Halesowen Road; and a goods station, at the Birmingham Canal Navigations wharf in Oldbury. Passenger services ran to Oldbury station until March 1915; and the line closed completely other than as a freight line for Albright and Wilson. All traces of its viaduct and embankment beyond Tat Bank Road were destroyed in 1964 when the M5 motorway was built. A short stub of the line to Oldbury remained in situ but out of use.

=== Road ===
The M5 motorway runs through the town on an elevated section supported by reinforced concrete pillars. Access is from junction 2.

The A4123 Birmingham to Wolverhampton dual carriageway runs just to west of the town centre. It provides a link from the Hagley Road near Harborne, Birmingham and runs north-westerly via Causeway Green to Birchley Island (M5 junction 2) and on through Tividale to Burnt Tree Junction where it becomes the Birmingham New Road. The road took three years to complete and was opened by the Prince of Wales on 2 November 1927.

Buses run from Oldbury town centre to Bearwood, Birmingham city centre, Dudley, Halesowen, Merry Hill Shopping Centre, West Bromwich and Walsall. Services are operated by West Midlands Bus and Diamond Bus.

=== Canal ===
James Brindley's original Birmingham Canal was cut south of Oldbury town centre in 1768.

== Media ==
Local news and television programmes are provided by BBC West Midlands and ITV Central. Television signals are received from the Sutton Coldfield TV transmitter.

Local radio stations are BBC Radio WM, BBC Radio Shropshire can also be received, Heart West Midlands, Smooth West Midlands, Hits Radio Black Country & Shropshire, Greatest Hits Radio Birmingham & The West Midlands, Greatest Hits Radio Black Country & Shropshire and Black Country Radio, a community based station.

The town is served by the local newspaper, Express & Star.

== Neighbourhoods ==
- Bristnall Fields is a residential area centred on the roundabout where Pound Road, Moat Road, Bristnall Hall Road, George Road and Brandhall Road meet. There is a post office, the Plough Inn and neighbourhood shops and services. Brandhall Allotments are off Brandhall Road. Oldbury Academy and a Salvation Army Church and Community Centre are on Pound Road.
- Brades Village is an area of established housing and industry near the border with Tipton.
- Brandhall is a residential area in the south of Oldbury that began to be developed in the 1930s.
- Causeway Green is a residential and commercial area where Causeway Green Road and Pound Road cross the Wolverhampton New Road. Local facilities include a post office/newsagent, convenience store, chemist, fast food outlets, a restaurant and a micropub. A car dealership is on Wolverhampton New Road; opposite is an Army Reserve Centre. Brandhall Golf Course off Heron Road dated from 1906 but closed in 2020. Housing on Old College Drive was built on a Sandwell College site. The People's Dispensary for Sick Animals (PDSA) opened a pet hospital on St Matthews Road in July 2015. Causeway Green Methodist Church on Penncricket Lane opened in 1863.
- Hill Top is a residential area surrounding Langley (Hill Top) Reservoir and the 225 metres (738 ft) high Warley Hill. Bristnall Hall Academy and Moat Farm Infants School are in the locality. Salop Drive Market Garden is a 3 acres (1 ha) working market garden and local food project operated by Ideal for All a registered charity for disabled and disadvantaged people.
- Langley Green is a residential area to the south of the town centre.
- Lion Farm is a large social housing estate built in the early to late 1960s in the south-west of the town, near the border with Rowley Regis. The estate had nine tower blocks, but only three remain.
- Londonderry is residential area in the south-east of the town, straddling the border with Smethwick. It is home to the Sandwell Aquatic Centre.
- Oldbury town centre is the historic heart from which the former urban district and borough developed.
- Rood End is an Edwardian and late-Victorian residential area in the east of the town, near the border with Smethwick.
- Titford is a mainly residential area 1 mile (1.6 km) south of Oldbury town centre. The Titford Canal terminates at Titford Pool in the Titford Pools Urban Reserve Park. In 2015, Aldi opened a supermarket on Wolverhampton Road, opposite an ASDA.
- Warley is an area of mostly private housing 2.8 miles (4.5 km) south-east of Oldbury town centre, bordered to the south by Quinton, Birmingham.
- Whiteheath, also known as Whiteheath Gate, is a residential area along the A4034 road south of Birchley Island between Blackheath ward and Langley ward. Coal mining and brickmaking took place here from around 1850 to 1920. An explosion at Ramrod Hall colliery in 1856 resulted in eleven deaths.

== Schools ==
The town has the following secondary schools:

- Bristnall Hall Academy
- Oldbury Academy
- Ormiston Sandwell Community Academy
- Perryfields Academy
- Q3 Academy Langley

== Parks and open spaces ==
Barnford Hill Park off Moat Road in Langley Green was opened in 1916 on land presented to the Borough of Oldbury by Mr W. A. Albright of chemical manufacturer, Albright and Wilson. The park's elevated position gives views to the north and west over the Black Country. There is a small outcrop of pudding stone, whose pebbles are mainly of encrinal limestone. The park holds a Green Flag Award and is designated one of the borough's nine flagship parks by Sandwell Council. It has an area of 34 hectares (84 acres) and features a pergola, hedge maze and rose garden. Facilities include a skateboarding ramp, multi-sports court, exercise equipment, children's play areas, football pitches, a pavilion and car parking. The park formerly catered for crown green bowling, tennis and putting.

The land for Langley Park was donated by Arthur Albright in 1886.

Tividale Park is a park in Tividale, which is near the border of Oldbury.

Broadwell Park features outdoor exercise equipment and fitness stations, as well as a small stream.

== Oldbury Borough archives collection ==
The archives for the Borough of Oldbury are held at Sandwell Community History and Archives Service

== Notable people ==
The Sadlers rose to become an eminent family in Oldbury during the nineteenth century. Notable figures included John Sadler (1820–1910) ('the Grand Old Man of Oldbury') and Sir Samuel Alexander Sadler.

Joseph Willott, Jr., member of the Wisconsin State Assembly, was born in Oldbury in 1855.

Cornelius Whitehouse (1795–1883) inventor of lap-welded wrought iron tube was born in Oldbury.

Mick Aston, archaeologist and star of the TV programme Time Team, was born in Oldbury and attended Oldbury Grammar School.

Martin Elliott (1946–2010), the photographer best known for the iconic poster "Tennis Girl", was born in Oldbury and attended Oldbury Grammar School.

Oldbury is the birthplace of Sir John Frederick Bridge, who was a famous organist, composer and author. He was known as "Westminster Bridge" because of his long stint as organist at Westminster Abbey (1882–1919). He composed special music for Queen Victoria's Jubilee and King Edward VII's coronation, in addition to other choral, instrumental and organ music. His brother Joseph Cox Bridge was also an organist, composer and author, becoming well known for his recorder compositions.

Jack Judge (1872–1938), the songwriter and music-hall entertainer best remembered for writing the song "It's a Long Way to Tipperary", was born in Oldbury. Jack Judge House, built in 2010 on Halesowen Street, housed Oldbury library until 2021 and is home to the Black Country Coroner's Court.

In his early years, the comedian Frank Skinner lived in Oldbury at 181 Bristnall Hall Road. He attended Moat Farm Infants School, St Hubert's Roman Catholic Junior School and Oldbury Technical School, and has been a TV comedian since the late 1980s.

Jodie Stimpson, the British triathlete was born in Oldbury in 1989 and attended Warley High School. She won Gold in the Individual and Team Relay Triathlon at the Glasgow Commonwealth Games in 2014.
