= Sandwell Metropolitan Borough Council =

Local authority in Sandwell, England

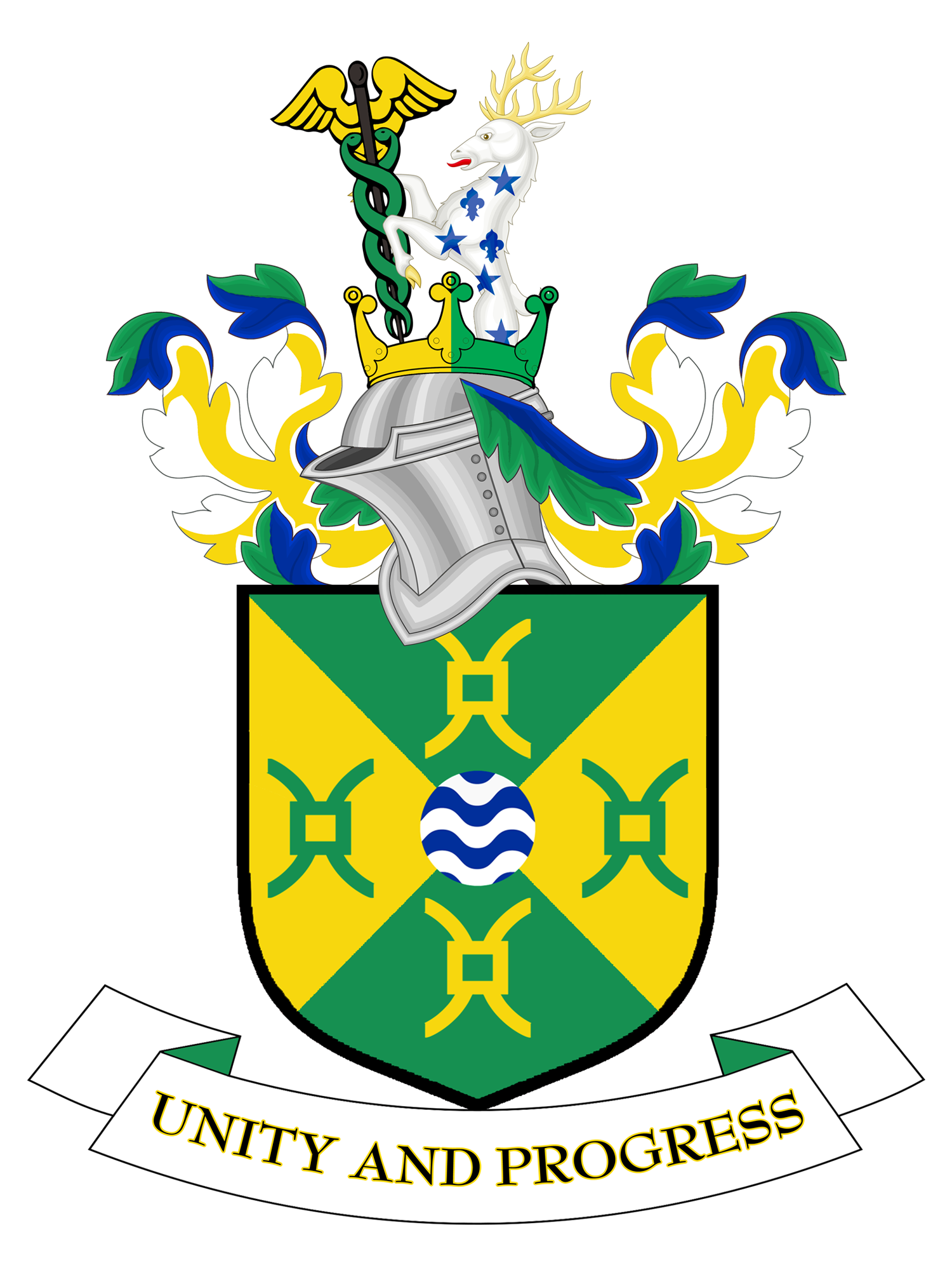

Type
- Type: Metropolitan borough council

Leadership
- Mayor: Margaret Sutton, Reform UK since 26 May 2026
- Leader: Ray Nock, Reform UK since 26 May 2026
- Chief Executive: Shokat Lal since February 2023

Structure
- Seats: 72 councillors
- Graph of the party split among 72 seats.
- Political groups: Administration (41) Reform (41) Other parties (31) Labour (28) Green (2) Independent (1)
- Joint committees: West Midlands Combined Authority

Elections
- Voting system: First past the post
- Last election: 7 May 2026
- Next election: 2027

Meeting place
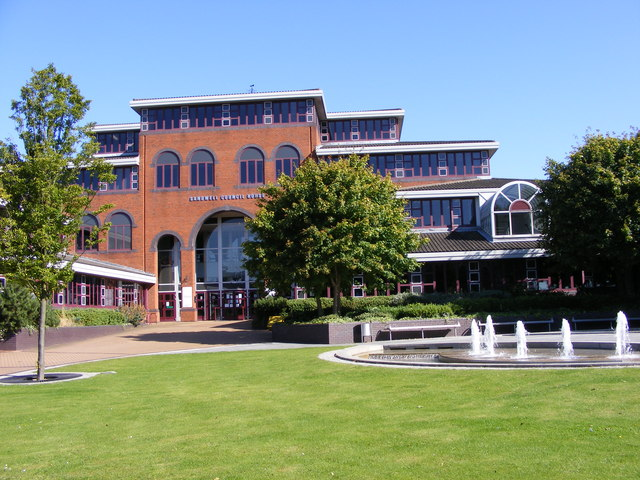
- Sandwell Council House, Freeth Street, Oldbury, B69 3DE

Website
- www.sandwell.gov.uk

Sandwell Metropolitan Borough Council, or Sandwell Council, is the local authority of the Metropolitan Borough of Sandwell in the West Midlands, England. It is a metropolitan borough council and provides the majority of local government services in the borough. The council has been a member of the West Midlands Combined Authority since 2016.

The council has been under Reform UK majority control since the May 2026 election. It is based at the Council House in Oldbury.

== History ==
The metropolitan district of Sandwell and its council were created in 1974 under the Local Government Act 1972, covering the combined area of the former county boroughs of Warley and West Bromwich, which were both abolished at the same time. It was the second major overhaul of local government structures in the area in eight years; the borough of Warley had only been created in 1966 as a merger of the old boroughs of Oldbury, Rowley Regis and Smethwick, whilst the borough of West Bromwich had been enlarged in 1966 to absorb the area of the abolished boroughs of Tipton and Wednesbury (along with more minor adjustments to the boundaries with other neighbours).

The new district was named Sandwell and it was one of the seven districts in the new metropolitan county of the West Midlands. The first election to the new council was held in 1973. For its first year the council acted as a shadow authority alongside the area's outgoing authorities. The new metropolitan district and its council formally came into being on 1 April 1974, at which point the old districts and their councils were abolished. The metropolitan district was awarded borough status from its creation, allowing the chair of the council to take the title of mayor.

From 1974 until 1986 the council was a lower-tier authority, with upper-tier functions provided by the West Midlands County Council. The county council was abolished in 1986 and its functions passed to the county's seven borough councils, including Sandwell, with some services provided through joint committees.

Since 2016 the council has been a member of the West Midlands Combined Authority, which has been led by the directly elected Mayor of the West Midlands since 2017. The combined authority provides strategic leadership and co-ordination for certain functions across the county, but Sandwell Council continues to be responsible for most local government functions.

In 2022 the government appointed commissioners to oversee the operation of certain functions at the council due to concerns about its performance. The commissioners were withdrawn in 2024 following improvements to the way the council operated.

== Governance ==
Sandwell Council provides metropolitan borough services. Some strategic functions in the area are provided by the West Midlands Combined Authority; the leader and deputy leader of the council sit on the board of the combined authority as Sandwell's representatives. There no civil parishes in the borough.

=== Political control ===
The council has been under Reform majority control since the 2026 election.

Political control of the council since 1974 has been as follows:

Party in control	Years
Labour	1974–1978
Conservative	1978–1979
Labour	1979–2026
Reform	2026–present

=== Leadership ===
The role of mayor is largely ceremonial in Sandwell. Political leadership is instead provided by the leader of the council. The leaders since 1974 have been:

Councillor	Party	From	To
David Bufton	Labour	1 Apr 1974	May 1978
Wilf Lunn	Conservative	May 1978	May 1979
Joe Adams	Labour	May 1979	May 1987
Ron Davis	Labour	May 1987	May 1992
Evelyn Matthews	Labour	May 1992	7 May 1997
Tarsem King	Labour	May 1997	May 2001
Bill Thomas	Labour	May 2001	23 Oct 2009
Darren Cooper	Labour	1 Dec 2009	26 Mar 2016
Steve Eling	Labour	24 May 2016	13 Feb 2019
Steve Trow	Labour	5 Mar 2019	May 2019
Yvonne Davies	Labour	21 May 2019	8 Jul 2020
Rajbir Singh	Labour	25 May 2021	16 Nov 2021
Kerrie Carmichael	Labour	7 Dec 2021	May 2026
Ray Nock	Reform	26 May 2026	

=== Composition ===
Following the 2026 election, the composition of the council was:

Party	Councillors
Reform	41
Labour	28
Green	2
Independent	1
Total	72

The next election is due in 2027.

== Elections ==
Since the last boundary changes took effect for the 2026 election, the council has comprised 72 councillors representing 24 wards, with each ward electing three councillors. Elections are held three years out of every four, with a third of the council (one councillor for each ward) elected each time for a four-year term of office.

== Premises ==
The council's headquarters are at the Council House on Freeth Street in the town centre of Oldbury. The building opened in 1989.

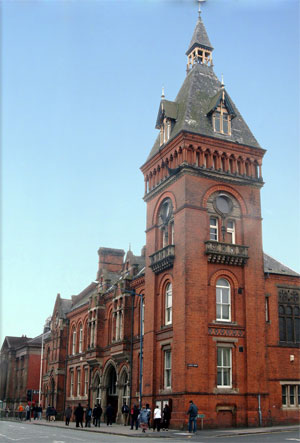
West Bromwich Town Hall: Council's headquarters until 1989

Prior to 1989, the council met and had its main offices at West Bromwich Town Hall, which had been completed in 1875 and had been the headquarters of the old West Bromwich Borough Council prior to 1974. Additional offices were spread across several buildings, including Smethwick Council House, which had been completed in 1907 for the old Smethwick Borough Council, and had subsequently been the headquarters of the short-lived Warley Borough Council between 1966 and 1974.
