= New Square (disambiguation) =

New Square, New York is a village in Ramapo, New York, United States.

New Square may also refer to:

== Places ==
- New Square, West Bromwich, England, a shopping venue
- New Square, Lincoln's Inn, London, England
- Republic Square, Almaty, or New Square, in Kazakhstan
- Nytorv ('New Square'), in Copenhagen, Denmark
- Plaza Vieja, Havana ('Old Square'), in Cuba, originally called Plaza Nueva ('New Square')
- Praça Amílcar Cabral, or Praça Nova ('New Square'), in Mindelo, São Vicente, Cape Verde
- Plaza Nueva (disambiguation) ('New Square'), the name of several places

== Other uses ==
- New Square Publications, publisher of The Dublin Magazine
