= Stone Cross, West Midlands =

Area of West Bromwich, England

Coordinates: 52°32′38″N 1°59′06″W

Stone Cross
- Location within the West Midlands
- OS grid reference: SP010940
- Metropolitan borough: Sandwell
- Metropolitan county: West Midlands
- Region: West Midlands
- Country: England
- Sovereign state: United Kingdom
- Post town: WEST BROMWICH
- Postcode district: B71
- Dialling code: 0121
- Police: West Midlands
- Fire: West Midlands
- Ambulance: West Midlands
- UK Parliament: Tipton and Wednesbury

Stone Cross is a residential area of West Bromwich in the metropolitan borough of Sandwell in the West Midlands of England. It is situated on the A4031 road that links West Bromwich and Walsall. To the southwest is Charlemont and Grove Vale and to the north is Friar Park.

Stone Cross takes its name from a wayside cross which stood until the 1890s - a replica was unveiled in 2002. It was a largely rural area until the late 1920s, when West Bromwich council built a large council housing development in the area, to the west of Walsall Road, which joined up with the new Friar Park estate, another council housing development.

In the centre of Stone Cross, there is a roundabout surrounding the Stone Cross pub. Stone Cross also has a small shopping area including a library, which opened in 1975.

On 10 November 1940, during World War II, a bomb landed on Walsall Road and damaged several houses, missing its target of a nearby anti-aircraft gun. There were no fatalities.

The suburb is served by Tame Bridge railway station, which gives railway links to Birmingham, Walsall, Rugeley and Wolverhampton. The centre is a major interchange of National Express West Midlands and Diamond bus services 4, 4H, 4M, and 40 bus services connecting to West Bromwich, Walsall, Wednesbury, Blackheath, Halesowen and Oldbury.

Stone Cross is home to the countries largest St George's Day parade, which runs between Stone Cross and Dartmouth Park in West Bromwich. In 2014 it attracted around 15000 people.
