= James Eaton =

Royal Navy officer (1783-c.1856)

- Born: 1783; London
- Died: c.1856 (aged 72–73); Hill House, West Bromwich
- Burial place: All Saints Church, Charlemont
- Military career
- Allegiance: United Kingdom of Great Britain and Ireland
- Branch: Royal Navy
- Service years: 1799 – 1842
- Rank: Commander
- Conflicts: French Revolutionary Wars; Battle of Algeciras Bay; Napoleonic Wars; Battle of Trafalgar; Invasion of Java
- Awards: Naval General Service Medal with two clasps

James Eaton (1783–1856/1857) was an officer of the Royal Navy. He served aboard HMS Temeraire at the Battle of Trafalgar; as signal midshipman, he was the first person to pass on Nelson's famous signal to the fleet; "England expects that every man will do his duty".

== Career ==
Born in London in 1783, Eaton entered the navy in 1799 during the French Revolutionary Wars. He was serving aboard the 74-gun HMS Hannibal during the Battle of Algeciras Bay on 6 July 1801. Hannibal was captured during the battle. Eaton was repatriated at some stage and by 1803 was a midshipman aboard HMS Atalante when she cut out several vessels in Quiberon Bay. He was appointed signal midshipman aboard HMS Temeraire by 1805, and served as such at Trafalgar, being promoted to lieutenant the following year.

He was later wounded while serving aboard HMS Lion when taking a convoy out to China. He served at the capture of Java in 1811, and in 1813 distinguished himself while aboard HMS Beaver when he helped in the rescue of the crew of a Swedish vessel. He finally retired from the navy with the rank of commander in 1842. He was subsequently awarded the Naval General Service Medal with two clasps for the actions he had served in during his naval career.

He settled in West Bromwich in 1837, and by 1839 he was living at Hill House where he died in either 1856 or 1857. He is buried at All Saints Church in Charlemont, West Bromwich. In 2005 as part of the Trafalgar bicentenary celebrations, his memorial in All Saints Churchyard was rededicated.

== See also ==
- O'Byrne, William Richard (1849). "Eaton, James" . A Naval Biographical Dictionary . John Murray – via Wikisource.

== Sources ==
- Mackenzie, Colonel Robert Holden (2004). The Trafalgar Roll: The Ships and the Officers. Chatham Publishing. ISBN 1-86176-228-3.
