= West Bromwich =

Town in West Midlands, England

Coordinates: 52.519°N 1.995°W

- Town
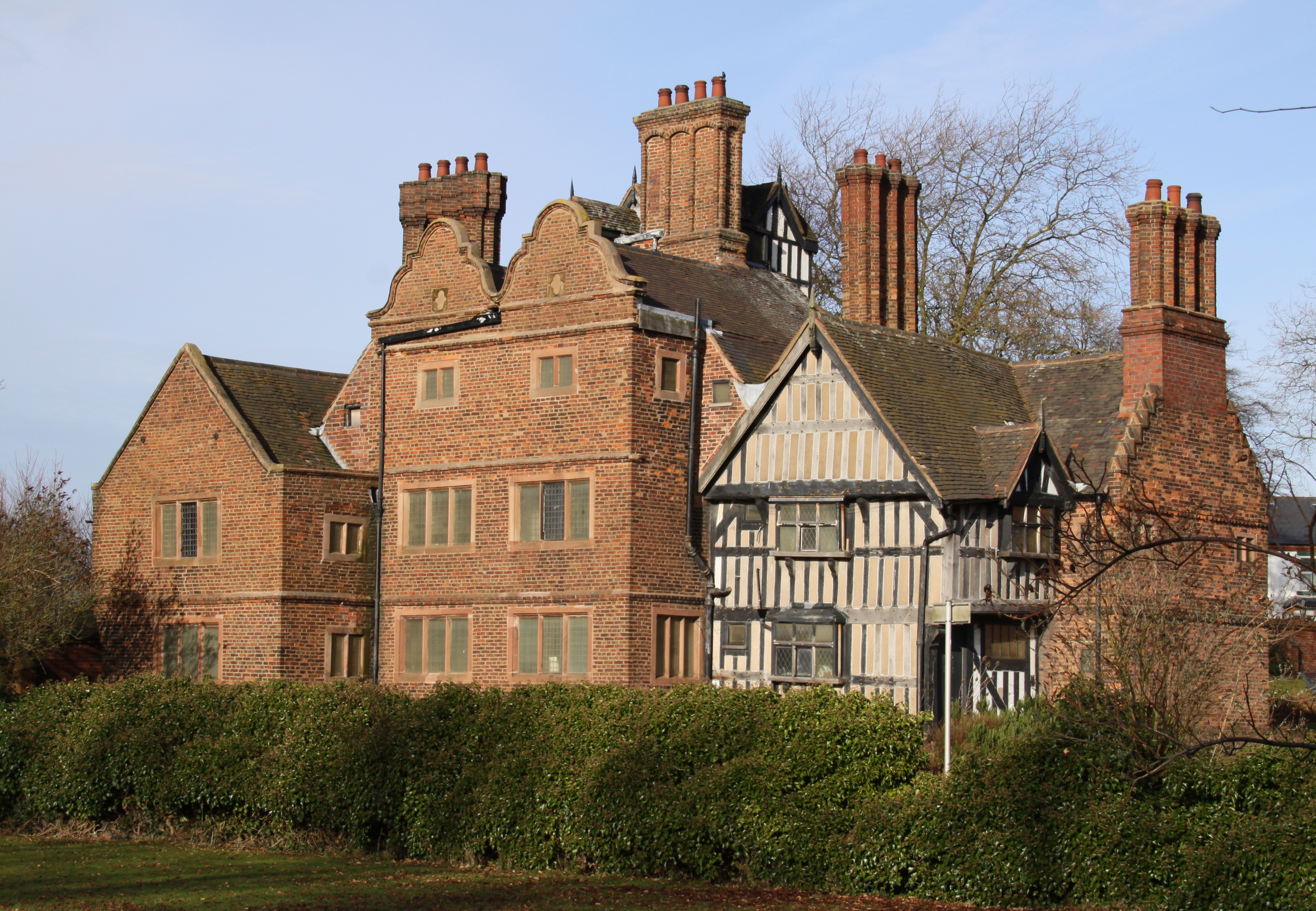
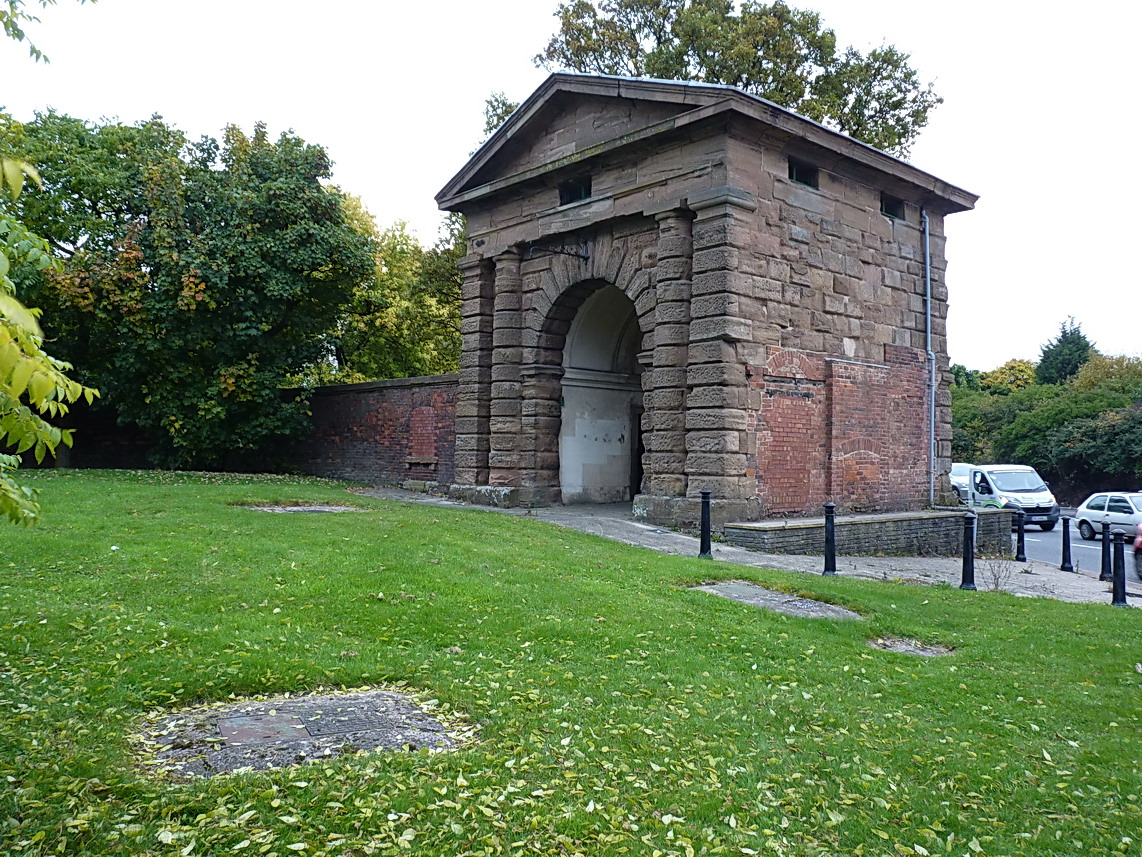
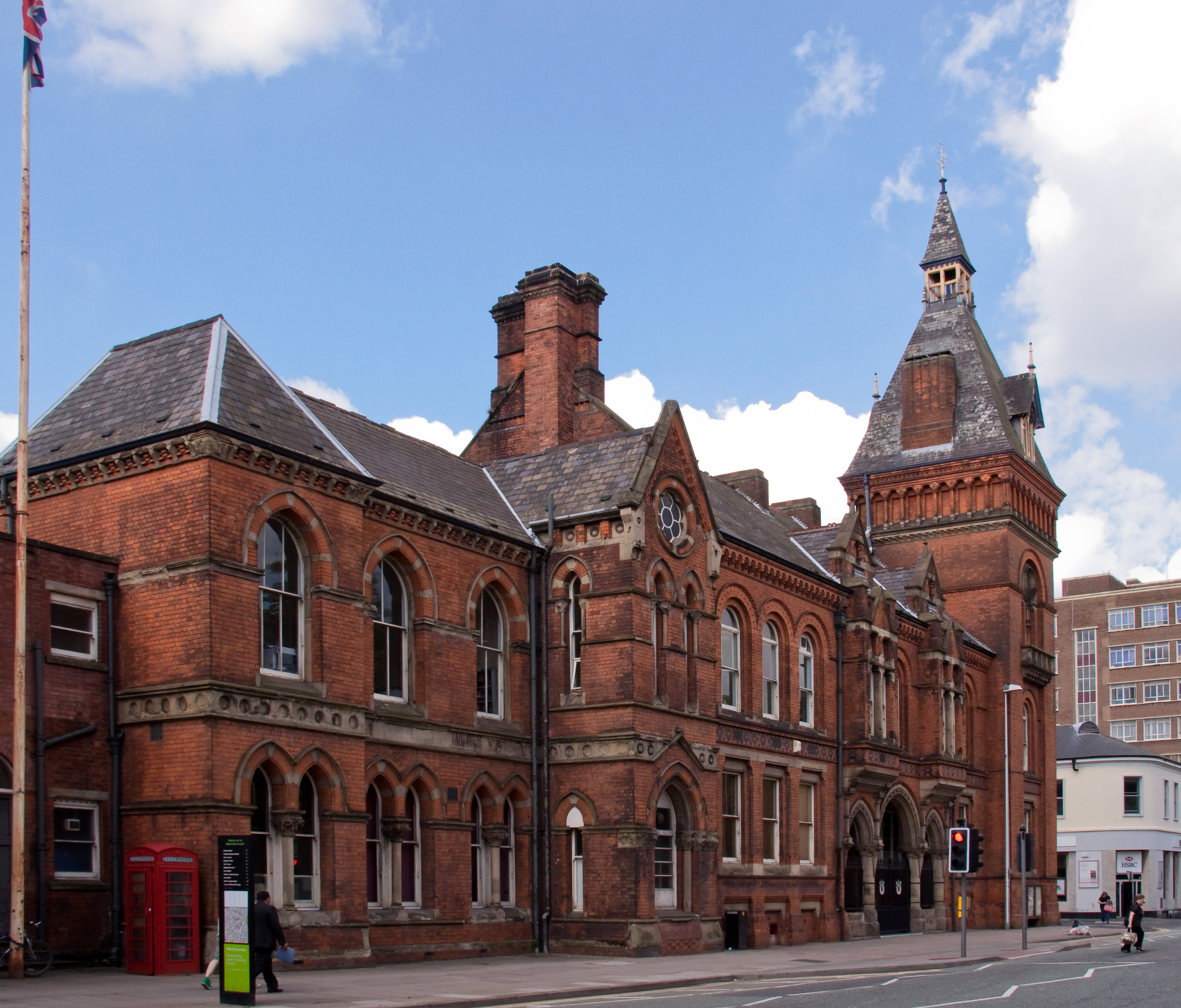
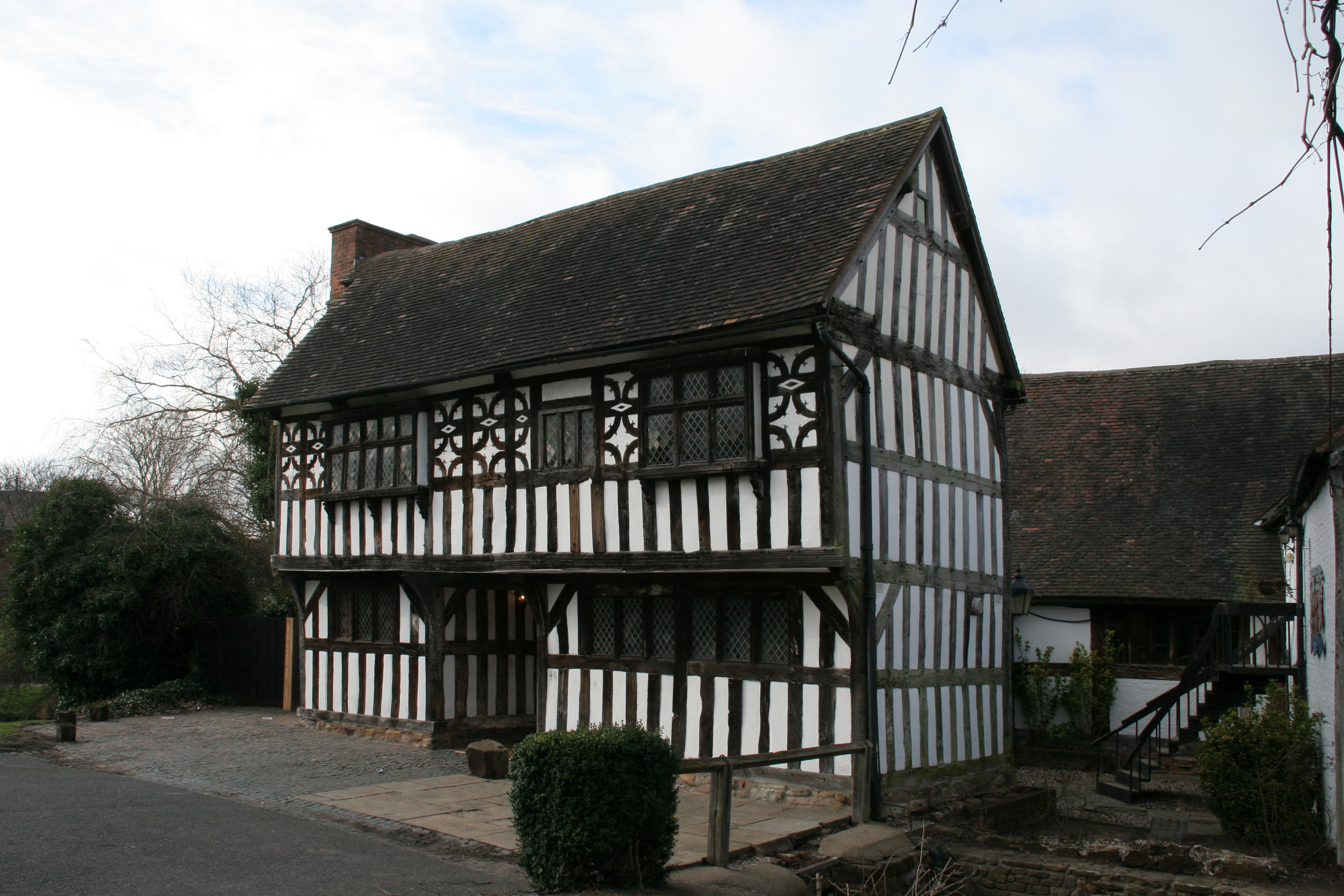
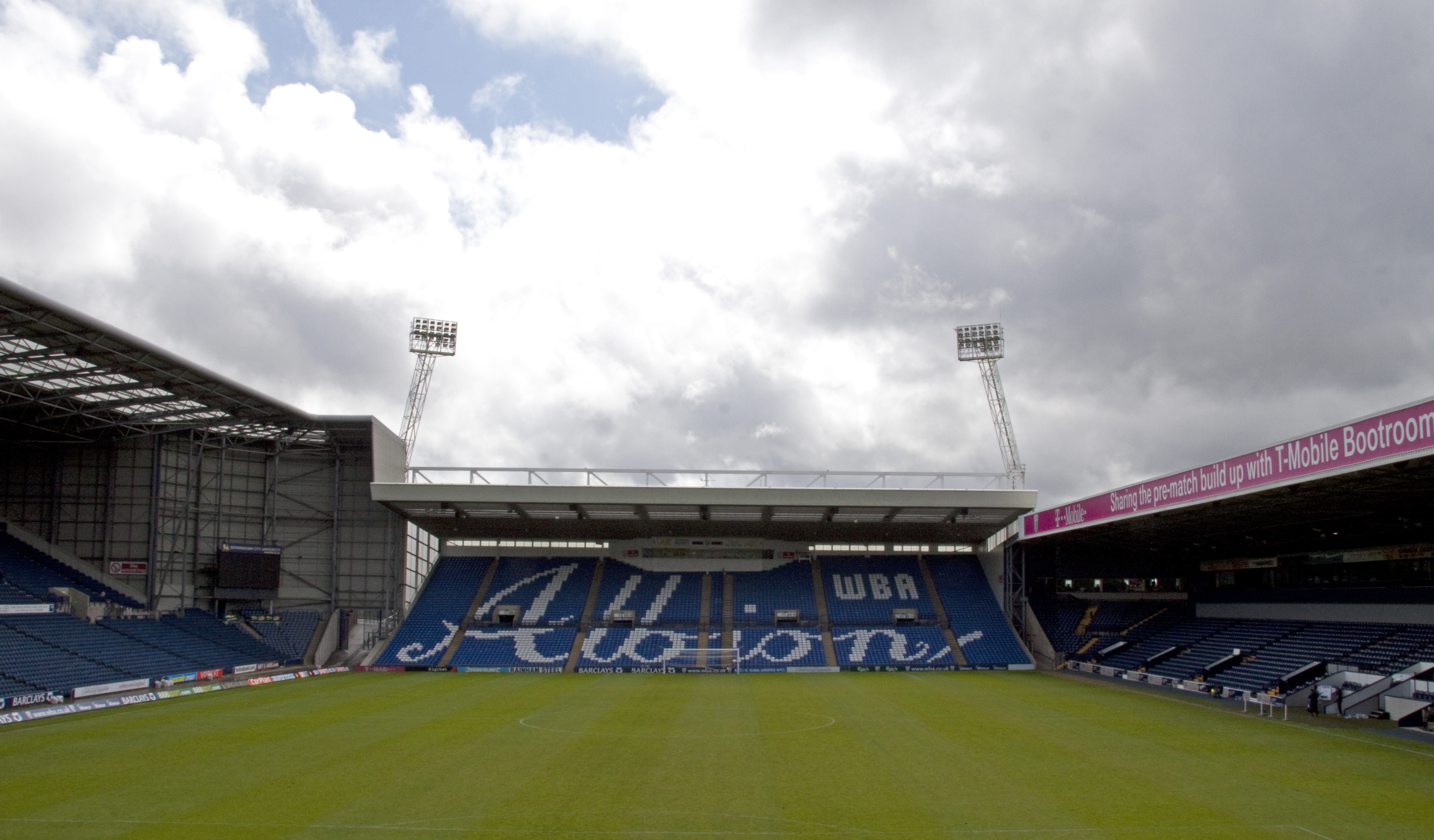
- Oak House Sandwell Arch West Bromwich Town Hall Bromwich Hall The Hawthorns

- Location within the West Midlands
- Population: 103,112
- OS grid reference: SP0091
  - London: 126 mi (203 km)
- Metropolitan borough: Sandwell
- Metropolitan county: West Midlands
- Region: West Midlands
- Country: England
- Sovereign state: United Kingdom
- Areas of the town: List: Balls Hill; Black Lake; Friar Park (part); Great Barr (Under council, the part of Great Barr in Sandwell is within the West Bromwich town for authority purposes, but the Sandwell part of Great Barr is generally within Birmingham, a neighbouring city); Great Bridge (part); Guns Village; Harvills Hawthorn; Hateley Heath; Hilltop; Lyng; Stone Cross; Swan Village; Tantany; Yew Tree & Tamebridge (often mistaken as part of Walsall)
- Post town: WEST BROMWICH
- Postcode district: B70 B71 WS5 (part) WS10 (part)
- Dialling code: 0121, 01922
- Police: West Midlands
- Fire: West Midlands
- Ambulance: West Midlands
- UK Parliament: Tipton and Wednesbury; West Bromwich

West Bromwich (/ˈbrɒmɪtʃ/ BROM-itch), commonly known as West Brom, is a market town in the borough of Sandwell, in the county of the West Midlands, England. Historically part of Staffordshire, it is around 6 miles west of Birmingham. West Bromwich is part of the area known as the Black Country, in terms of geography, cultures and dialect. West Bromwich had a population of 103,112 in the 2021 Census.

Initially a rural village, West Bromwich's growth corresponded with that of the Industrial Revolution, owing to the area's natural richness in ironstone and coal, as well as its proximity to canals and railway branches. It led to the town becoming a centre for coal mining, brick making, the iron industry and metal trades such as nails, springs and guns. The town's primary economy developed into the engineering, manufacturing and the automotive industry through the early 20th century. During the Second World War, West Bromwich experienced bombing from the German Luftwaffe. It also suffered heavily during recessions in the mid 1970s, early 1980s and late 2000s.

The town is known for its football club West Bromwich Albion, who have played in the town since the club's formation in 1878. It is also home to parts of Sandwell Valley Country Park and Sandwell Valley RSPB nature reserve.

It has Wednesbury to the north-west, Walsall in the north, Birmingham to the east, Smethwick to the south-east, Oldbury to the south, and Tipton to the west. The town borders Handsworth, Birmingham in the south-east through Holyhead road.

== History ==
=== Origin and etymology ===
West Bromwich was first mentioned as Bromwic ('broom village') in the Domesday Book of 1086. It is believed that it may have originally been part of the Handsworth parish. A Benedictine priory existed in West Bromwich from the 12th century around which the settlement of Broomwich Heath grew. In 1727, the town became a stop on the coaching road between London and Shrewsbury and the beginning of its growth dates from this time. The prefix 'West' serves to distinguish it from the village of Castle Bromwich, around 8 miles (13 km) to the east on the other side of Birmingham.

=== Development ===
In the 19th century, coal deposits were discovered, ensuring that the town grew rapidly as an industrial centre, with industries such as spring, gun and nail making developing. Well before the end of the 19th century, West Bromwich had established itself as a prominent area to match older neighbouring towns including Dudley and Walsall.

Historical population
Year	Pop.	±%
1801	5,687	—
1811	7,485	+31.6%
1821	9,505	+27.0%
1831	15,377	+61.8%
1841	26,121	+69.9%
1851	34,581	+32.4%
1861	41,795	+20.9%
1871	47,918	+14.7%
1881	56,295	+17.5%
1891	59,538	+5.8%
1901	65,175	+9.5%
1950	89,000	+36.6%
1991	146,386	+64.5%

In 1888, West Bromwich became a county borough, incorporating the village of Great Barr. It was expanded in 1966, acquiring most of the boroughs of Tipton and Wednesbury as well as a small section of Coseley urban district, before joining with the neighbouring county borough of Warley (which contained the towns of Rowley Regis, Oldbury and Smethwick) in 1974 to form the Metropolitan Borough of Sandwell.

Charlemont Hall, built during the 1750s, stood on the west side of the present Charlemont Crescent, in the Charlemont and Grove Vale district of the town. Charlemont Hall was described c. 1800 as "a lofty neat-looking house of brick, faced with stone, with iron palisades etc. in front." An east wing was added in 1855. The last occupant was the widow of Thomas Jones, town clerk of Wednesbury 1897–1921. The house was demolished in 1948, and is now covered by a number of smaller detached homes. Much of the surrounding area was developed during the 1960s as the Charlemont Farm housing estate, which is a mix of private and council housing.

The population of West Bromwich suffered heavily in the Cholera epidemic of 1831 which spread northwards into the town. A temporary board of health was set up and a hospital opened in the former Revivalist chapel in Spon Lane. The natural gradual slope of the land provided drainage within the soil, however, urbanisation made this increasingly difficult and drainage along the streets was described as inadequate. The West Bromwich Town Improvement Commissioners was established in 1854, and they tackled the drainage problem in the town. They appointed members to new titles and in the 1880s bought land in Friar Park for a sewerage farm.

Under the Reform Act 1832, West Bromwich became part of the new southern division of Staffordshire, and under the Representation of the People Act 1867 it was transferred to the parliamentary borough of Wednesbury. Under the Redistribution of Seats Act 1885, the borough of West Bromwich became a parliamentary borough returning one member. In 1885, it was held by the Liberal Party but from 1886 to 1906 it was held by the Conservative Party before being held by the Liberal Party again until 1910 when the Conservative Party regained the area which they held until 1918 under the representation of Viscount Lewisham. In 1918, it was won by Labour who held it until 2019, when Nicola Richards was elected as MP. Prior to that the constituency was held by Labour except for the period between 1931 and 1935 when it held by the National Unionists.

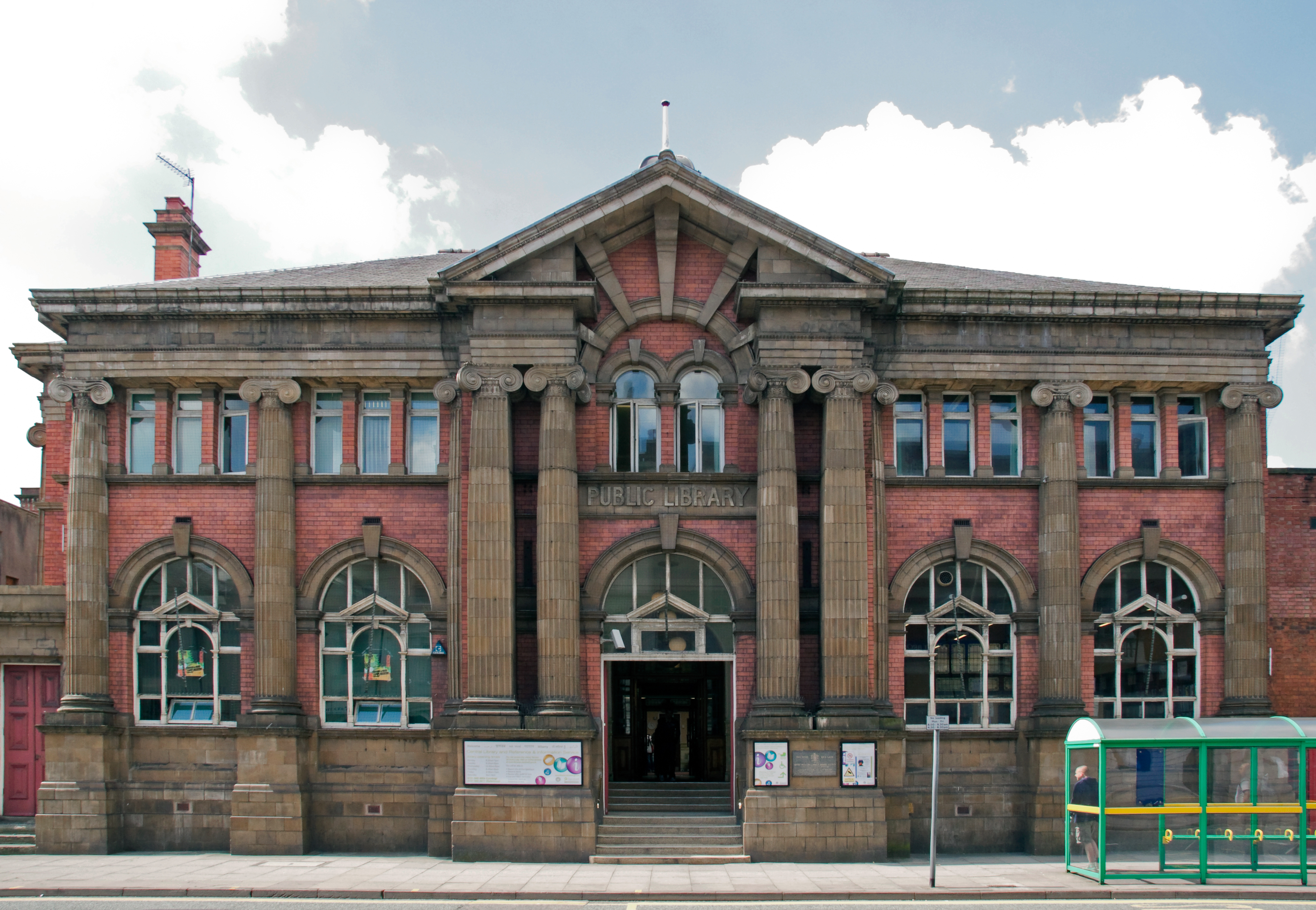
West Bromwich Library

=== 20th century ===
By the outbreak of World War I in 1914, many of the older houses built to house workers during the Industrial Revolution were becoming unfit for human habitation. Sanitation was inadequate, decay was rife, and the homes were becoming a danger to the health and safety of their inhabitants. After the end of the war, the local council started building new homes to rehouse people from the rundown town centre. However, there are still many late 19th century and early 20th century buildings around the centre of West Bromwich.

The first council housing in West Bromwich was built in 1920 on the Tantany Estate to the north of the town centre. Within 20 years, several thousand council houses had been built by West Bromwich County Borough Council. The largest developments were mostly in the north of the town, including the Charlemont Farm Estate around Walsall Road, and the Friar Park Estate near the border with Wednesbury.

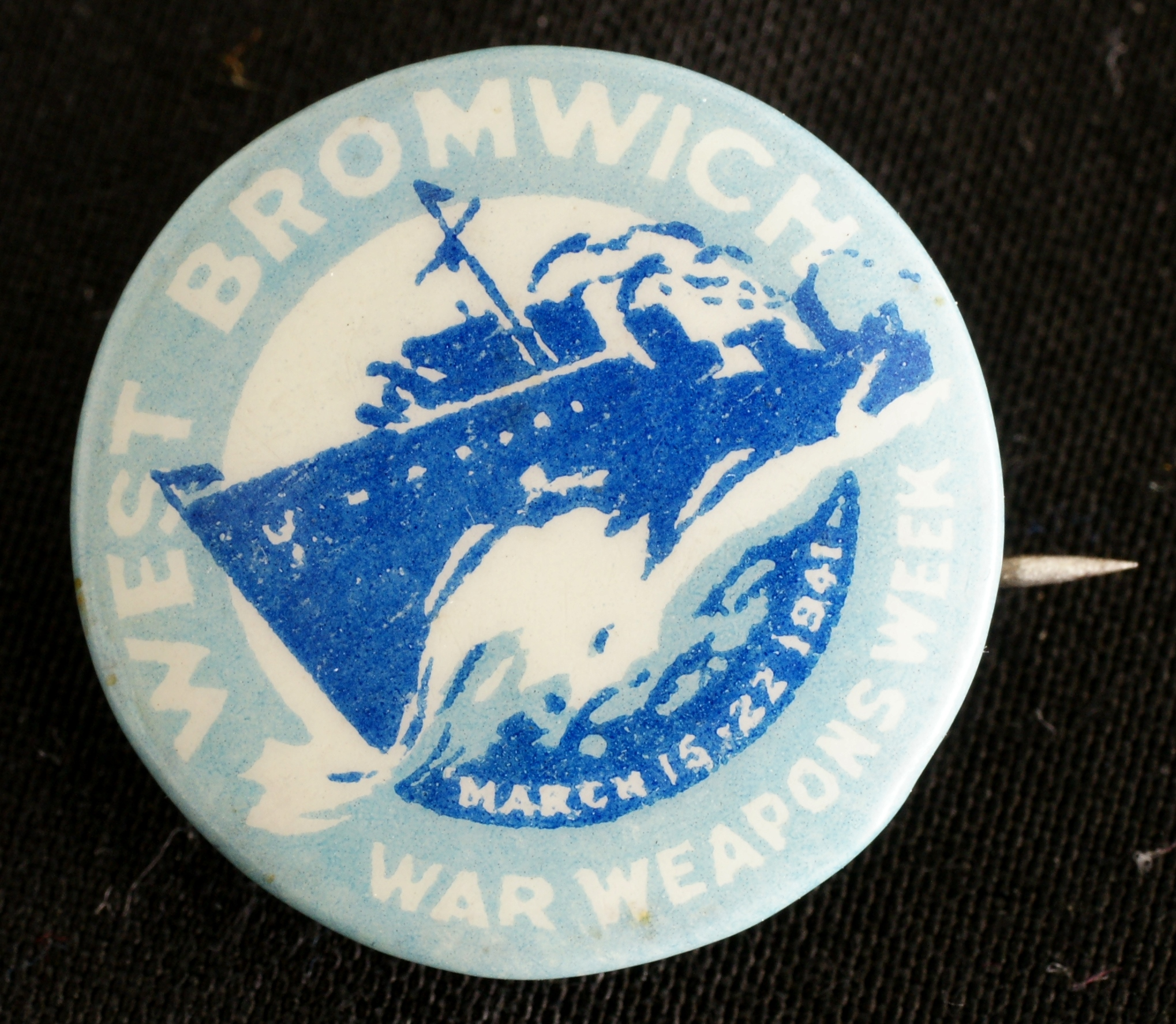
World War II fund-raising badge, sold during "War Weapons Week", 15–22 March 1941

The town suffered significant damage from air raids in World War II, with 58 civilian deaths, most in the raids of 19 November 1940 around Oak Road and Lombard Street to the west of the town centre. There were a few other less severe raids during the war on parts of West Bromwich including Stone Cross and Tantany, with no fatalities. This occurred on the same night as the Birmingham Blitz, which resulted in thousands of casualties, as well as the less severe raids on nearby Dudley and Tipton.

The first major postwar council housing development was the Harvills Hawthorn Estate near Hill Top, which was completed in 1948.

Substantial immigration from the Commonwealth took place in West Bromwich during the 1950s and 1960s, with most of these hailing from the Indian subcontinent, although a significant number of Afro-Caribbean immigrants also settled in West Bromwich. The majority of these immigrants settled in the older parts of the town that were mostly made up of Victorian and Edwardian terraced houses. West Bromwich made national news in 1955 when an Indian man (Bhikabhai Patel) was employed by the town's transport department, and almost all the drivers and conductors went on strike in protest.

The local road network was also greatly increased during the 1960s and 1970s. West Bromwich is at the extreme northern end of the M5 motorway, with junction 1 serving the town on the A41 road. Traffic passing through West Bromwich on the main route from Wolverhampton to Birmingham was soon diverted along the new dual carriageway, the Northern Loop Road (also known as The Expressway), after its opening in 1972, with another dual carriageway being built to link The Expressway with neighbouring Oldbury.

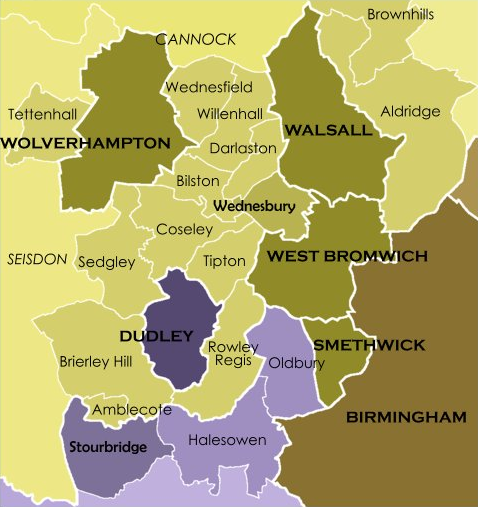
The local government structure within North Worcestershire and South Staffordshire – Prior to the West Midlands Order 1965 reorganisation

West Bromwich County Borough was expanded in 1966 to include the bulk of Tipton and Wednesbury, while a small part of the south-eastern section of the town was absorbed into the new Warley County Borough which was centred on neighbouring Oldbury, Smethwick and Rowley Regis. The actual town boundaries of West Bromwich were also altered at this time, placing the Friar Park estate in Wednesbury, while the Hateley Heath area of Wednesbury was now within the borders of West Bromwich township.

As with many other parts of the Midlands, West Bromwich was hit badly by the recessions of the mid-1970s and early 1980s, resulting in mass unemployment across the town, exceeding 20% in some districts.

Queen's Square shopping centre opened in the town centre in 1971, providing shoppers with a 60-unit indoor shopping centre and an 850-space multi-storey car park. It cost £3million to build. The smaller King's Square shopping centre also opened in the town in 1971. On 8 December 2011, 40 years after the opening of Queen's Square, Sandwell Council announced that Queen's Square would be refurbished at a cost of £5million. By this stage, the centre was falling into disrepair and only 33 of the 61 available units were occupied. Once again, West Bromwich had been hit hard by another recession, with local unemployment running high again, as well as a high vacancy rate for commercial and industrial units.

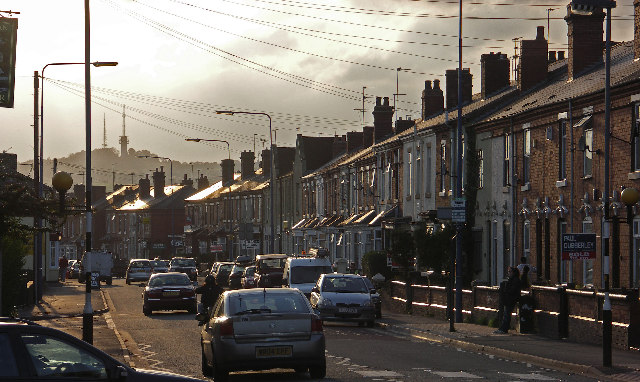
Bromford Lane, West Bromwich. Photograph looking southwest towards Oldbury. Steam trams ran along the road between 1885 and 1929.

Many local towns, particularly Dudley, lost many of their major stores around the time that the Merry Hill Shopping Centre which was developed at Brierley Hill during the second half of the 1980s as businesses looked to take advantage of the Enterprise Zone incentives that the centre offered. West Bromwich's fortunes as a retail centre were seriously affected by the Merry Hill development. This contributed to the closure of its Marks and Spencer store on 25 August 1990, along with the Dudley store, to be replaced by a new store at Merry Hill, with most of the staff at the new store being transferred from either West Bromwich or Dudley. British Home Stores also pulled out of the town around the same time, and a new store at Merry Hill which opened in November 1989 also spelled the end of the Dudley store.

The town lost another big retail name in 2005 when the Littlewoods store closed as part of the retailer's decision to switch wholly to online shopping; the unit has since been taken over by New Look. Retail developments around Oldbury, beginning with the SavaCentre hypermarket in 1980, have also affected trade in West Bromwich. The recession beginning in 2008 has pushed the town centre further into decline, a notable casualty being the Woolworths store which closed on 30 December 2008 as a result of the retailer going into liquidation; the building was not re-occupied until Home Bargains took it over in 2012.

Several more factories have closed in more recent years as manufacturers look to countries where the labour is cheaper, but West Bromwich remains a relatively busy industrial area despite the decline of the last 35 years.

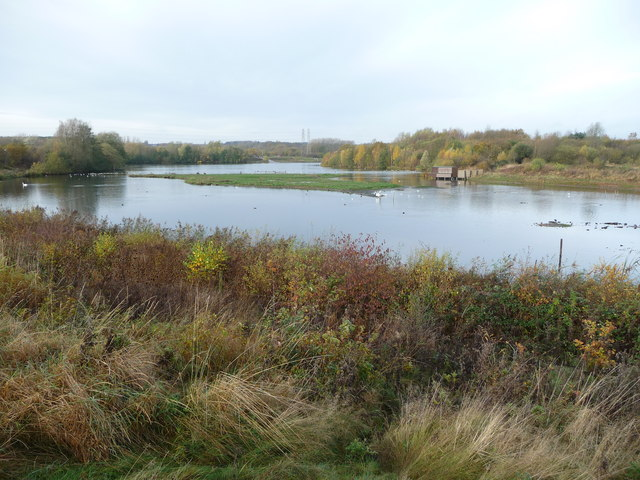
Forge Mill Lake, Sandwell Valley Country Park

West Bromwich's road links were further enhanced in 1995 on the completion of the Black Country Spine Road which also by-passes Wednesbury and the east of Bilston. The completion of this new road opened up several square miles of previously inaccessible land, and has allowed several major businesses to set up along the route. This has helped relieve some of the unemployment problems in West Bromwich, although most parts of the town still have the highest unemployment rates in the West Midlands.

=== 21st century ===
West Bromwich was among the many towns and cities in England affected by the widespread rioting in August 2011. On 9 August, shops closed their doors early to combat looting and vandalism; this was followed by widespread acts of vandalism and violence followed. Police closed the main roads leading into the town until the following morning.

The town has enjoyed something of an economic revival since July 2013, when, after a large scale demolition of an area including the school known as Cronehills, the New Square shopping and entertainment complex opened in the town centre on land adjoining the existing Queen's Square shopping centre.

The mixed success of West Bromwich Albion F.C. has also had a significant impact on the town's economy, particularly during the club's successful era of the 1960s and 1970s when it frequently competed in the top division of English football, won the FA Cup and qualified for European competitions on several occasions. Attendances were high during this era, but slumped during the 1980s when the club's on-the-field fortunes began to decline and culminated in relegation in 1986, at a time which the local economy had already suffered a sharp decline. Albion did not play in the top flight again until 2002, and remained a regular presence in the FA Premier League until 2018, during which time the club attracted a level of average attendance not seen since the late 1970s.

The archives for West Bromwich Borough are held at Sandwell Community History and Archives Service.

== Governance ==
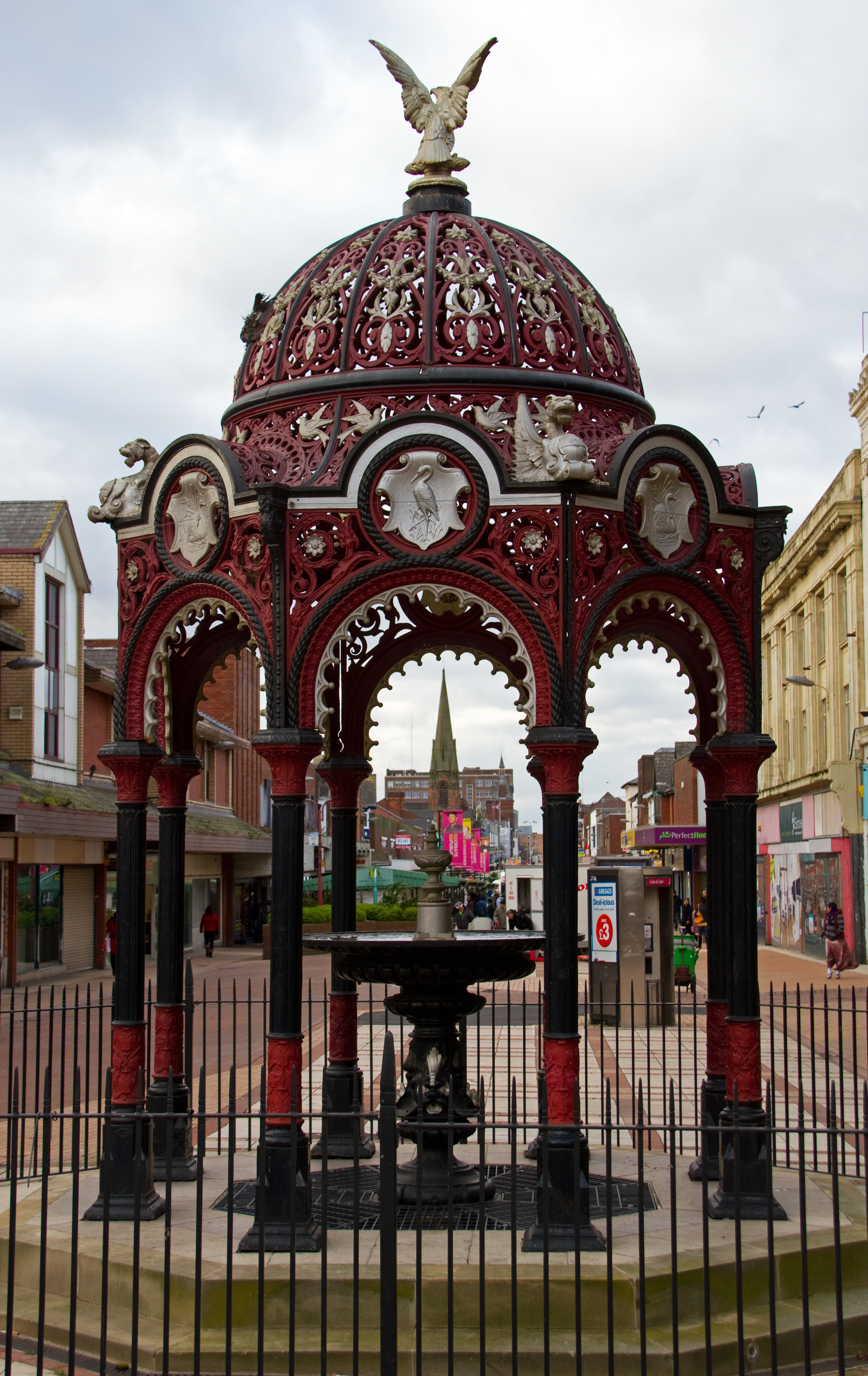
Farley Fountain, a drinking fountain built in 1885 by town mayor Reuben Farley as a memorial to his mother Elizabeth Farley

The town is divided into two constituencies: Tipton and Wednesbury and West Bromwich.

West Bromwich is served by Sarah Coombes (Labour Party), who was elected on 4 July 2024.

Tipton and Wednesbury is served by Antonia Bance (Labour Party), who was elected on 4 July 2024. Betty Boothroyd had previously served as the constituency's MP and she was the first female Speaker of the House of Commons.

== Demography ==
At the 2021 census, West Bromwich's built-up area population was recorded as having a population of 103,112. Of the findings, the ethnicity and religious composition of the wards separately were:

West Bromwich: Ethnicity (2021 Census)
Ethnic group	Population	%
White	53,891	52.3%
Asian or Asian British	30,813	29.9%
Black or Black British	9,471	9.2%
Mixed	4,265	4.1%
Other Ethnic Group	4,087	4%
Arab	582	0.6%
Total	103,112	100%

The religious composition of the built-up area at the 2021 Census was recorded as:

West Bromwich: Religion (2021 Census)
Religious	Population	%
Christian	41,416	42.3%
Irreligious	22,822	23.3%
Sikh	15,587	15.9%
Muslim	11,865	12.1%
Hindu	4,705	4.8%
Other religion	1,042	1.1%
Buddhist	383	0.4%
Jewish	29	0.2%
Total	103,112	100%

=== Climate ===
The climate in this area has mild differences between highs and lows, and there is adequate rainfall year-round. The Köppen Climate Classification subtype for this climate is "Cfb". (Marine West Coast Climate/Oceanic climate).

Climate data for West Bromwich
Month	Jan	Feb	Mar	Apr	May	Jun	Jul	Aug	Sep	Oct	Nov	Dec	Year
Mean daily maximum °C (°F)	7 (44)	8 (46)	10 (50)	13 (55)	16 (61)	19 (66)	22 (72)	22 (72)	18 (64)	14 (57)	10 (50)	7 (45)	14 (57)
Mean daily minimum °C (°F)	2 (36)	2 (36)	3 (37)	4 (39)	7 (45)	10 (50)	12 (54)	12 (54)	9 (48)	7 (45)	4 (39)	2 (36)	6 (43)
Average precipitation mm (inches)	43 (1.7)	38 (1.5)	25 (1)	30 (1.2)	28 (1.1)	36 (1.4)	33 (1.3)	28 (1.1)	38 (1.5)	48 (1.9)	41 (1.6)	41 (1.6)	430 (16.9)
Source: Weatherbase

== Features ==
Engineering and chemicals are important to the town's economy, as it played a crucial part in the Industrial Revolution during the 19th century and still retains many manufacturing jobs to this day, despite a steady nationwide decline in this sector since the 1970s.

Sandwell General Hospital (on the site of the former Hallam Hospital) is located near the town centre. It is currently part of the Sandwell and West Birmingham Hospitals NHS Trust, one of the largest NHS teaching trusts in the United Kingdom.

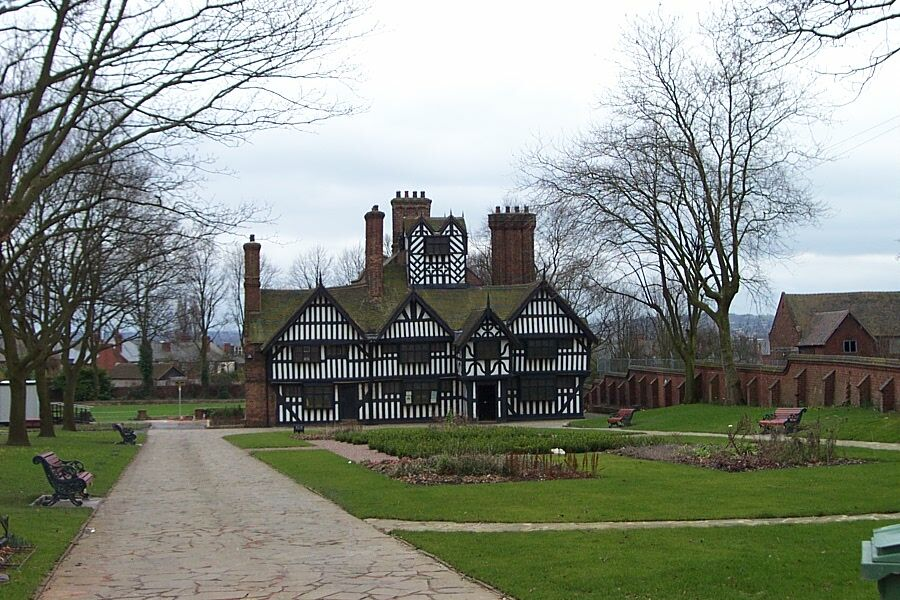
Oak House, West Bromwich.

William Legge, 2nd Earl of Dartmouth had his seat at Sandwell Hall. Legge was unusual as an aristocrat of this period by being a Methodist and attending the Wednesbury Methodist meetings, where fellow Methodists – many of them colliers and drovers – knew him as "Brother Earl".

West Bromwich Town Hall, situated in the centre of the High Street, is a Grade II listed building. It was built between 1874 and 1875 in brick and stone to an Italian Gothic design, and its interior reflects the Victorian interest in Gothic and Medieval architecture. Its Grand Organ, built in 1862, is considered to be of historic importance for its musical and technical qualities.

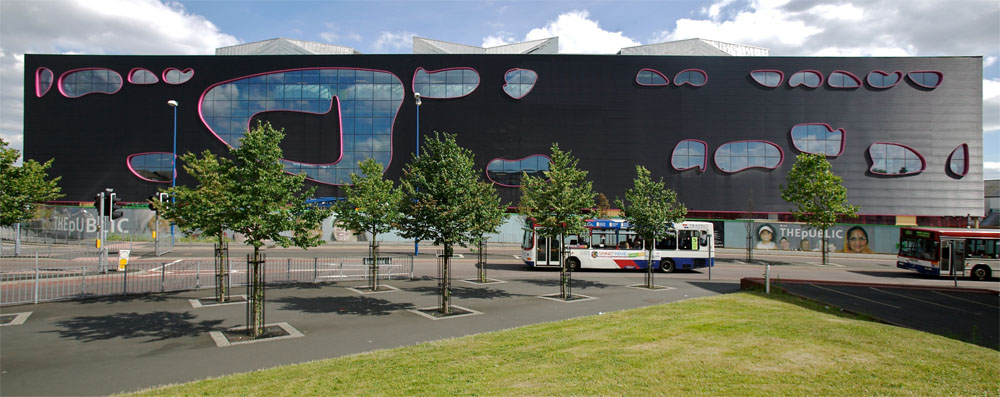
The Public, by Will Alsop

West Bromwich Manor House, Hall Green Road, was built by the de Marnham family in the late 13th century as the centre of their agricultural estate in West Bromwich only the Great Hall survives of the original complex of living quarters, agricultural barns, sheds and ponds. Successive occupants modernised and extended the Manor House until it was described in 1790 as "a large pile of irregular half-timbered buildings, black and white, and surrounded with numerous out-houses and lofty walls." The Manor House was saved from demolition in the 1950s by West Bromwich Corporation which carried out an extensive and sympathetic restoration of this nationally important building.

The Oak House is an historic building in the Greets Green area. Its exact date of origin is uncertain, but in 1634 it was owned by the Turtons. John Wesley preached there twice in the late 1700s. Reuben Farley gave it to the town as a museum, with the formal opening on 25 July 1898. In 1949 it was protected as a Grade II* Listed Building.

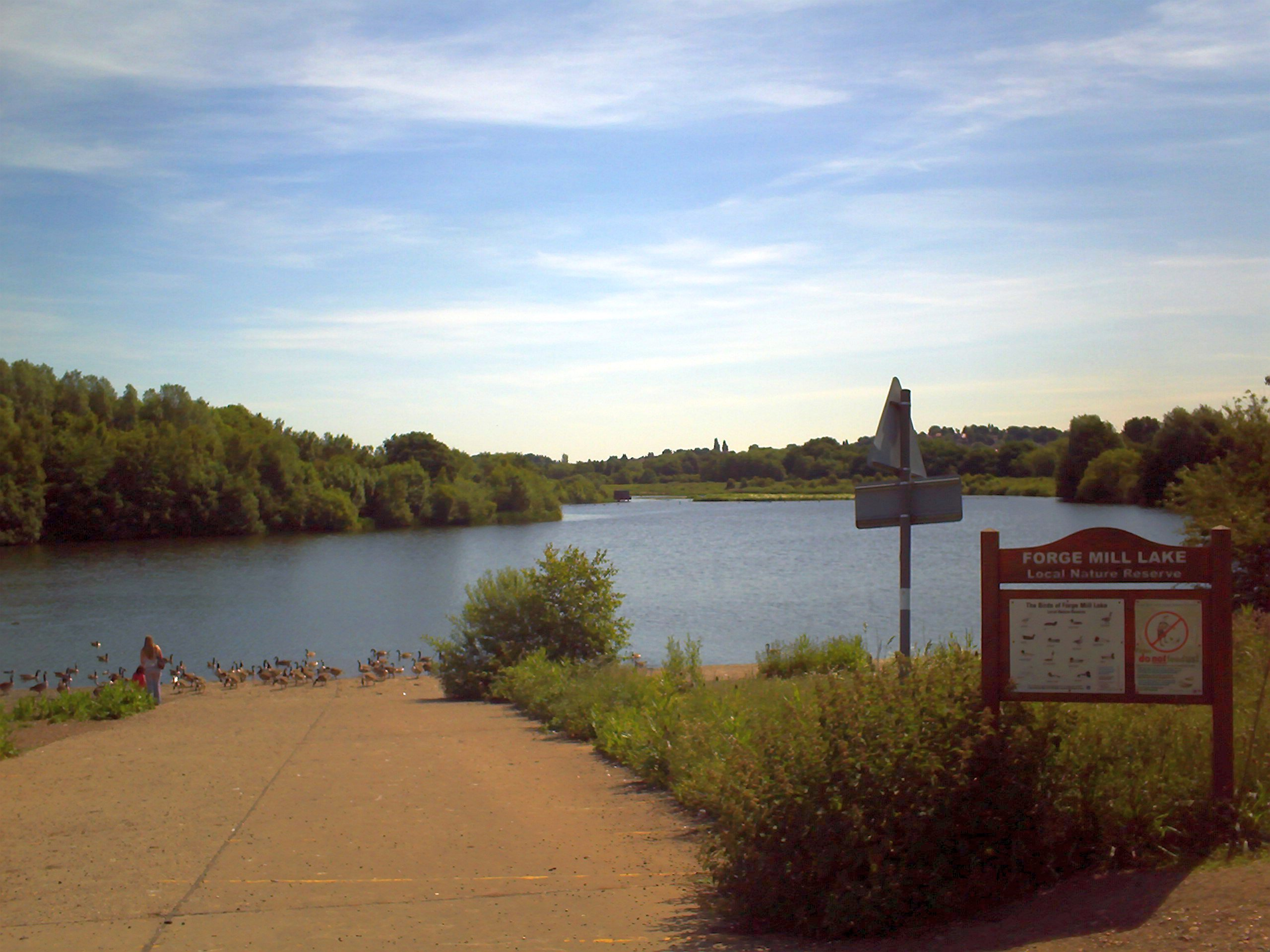
The lakes and pools within Sandwell Valley are home to a wide range of water fowl and also play host to migrating birds.

In August 2009, The Public arts centre designed by architect Will Alsop fully opened. By 2013, the venue was attracting nearly 400,000 visitors a year and was bringing leading national and international artists to the town. Originally beset by problems before opening, in May 2013, it was revealed that Sandwell Council were considering borrowing a substantial amount of money to repurpose the £70 million building and lease it to Sandwell College to provide a new sixth form centre to complement the recently opened Central Campus in the town.

A large portion of the town centre was procured by Tesco for the development of a Tesco Extra store and shopping centre called New Square, West Bromwich which has been built on top of the old hospital. In the early 2000s the tenants of homes and businesses have slowly moved out of the site to make way for the development. Cronehills Primary School (staff and pupils) relocated to the newly built Eaton Valley Primary School, which opened in September 2009. The police station relocated to a brand new building the other site of the ring road. Major works started on the site during October 2011 and the development was completed by late spring 2013.

Dartmouth Park, opened in 1878 by William Legge, 5th Earl of Dartmouth, lies to the east of the town. Beyond Dartmouth Park is Sandwell Valley, which contains Sandwell Valley Country Park and Sandwell Valley RSPB nature reserve. The 660 acre country park is located on the River Tame, in the middle of the urban conurbation between Birmingham and West Bromwich. The RSPB nature reserve is adjacent, and attracts over 150 different bird species. There are also two farms on the site that are open to the public: Sandwell Park Farm and Forge Mill Farm.

== Religion ==
West Bromwich is a culturally diverse area with many places of worship for several different religions.

At the time of writing (2023), The Church of England provides the most places of worship across the geographically wider West Bromwich Deanery (taking in West Bromwich, Hill Top, Stone Cross, Carter's Green, Holy Trinity, All Saints, St Andrew's, St Francis, Friar Park and others) which contains nine Anglican churches. The deanery of West Bromwich is under the Anglican Diocese of Lichfield. Other Christian denominations are present, including Roman Catholic, Seventh-day Adventist, Methodist, Baptist, Elim Pentecostal, Assemblies of God and other independent churches.

There are also a large number of Sikhs in the area. There are many Gurudwaras. Sikhs have settled in the area since 1950, when the first influx of immigrants came. The oldest Gurdwara in West Bromwich is the Gurdwara Guru Har Rai Sahib Ji on High Street. Other Gurdwaras include Guru Nanak Gurdwara on Edward Street and Gurdwara Sachkhand Ishar Darbar on Vicarage Road.

Hindus have had a formal place of worship in West Bromwich since the opening of the Shree Krishna Mandir in 1974, in a converted church once called Ebenezer Congregational Chapel, which had closed in 1971. It was damaged by fire on 8 December 1992, the same date that a Mandir in Birmingham and another in Coventry were damaged in arson attacks. It was believed to have been connected to religious violence in India that was spreading into communities in Britain.

In 1875, being locked out of a packed Evangelist meeting in Birmingham caused John Blackham of Ebenezer Congregational Church to start the Pleasant Sunday Afternoon Movement.

== Transport ==
=== Railway ===
West Bromwich railway station was opened by the Great Western Railway on its route between Birmingham Snow Hill and Wolverhampton Low Level on 14 November 1854. The trackbed of that line is now served by the West Midlands Metro light rail (tram) system with West Bromwich having seven tram stops: The Hawthorns, Kenrick Park, Trinity Way, West Bromwich Central, Lodge Road West Bromwich Town Hall, Dartmouth Street and Dudley Street Guns Village. The nearest main-line railway station is now Sandwell & Dudley railway station, approximately one mile (two kilometres) away in Oldbury town centre. Though services to Stourbridge Junction, Worcester Shrub Hill, Worcester Foregate Street, Birmingham Snow Hill and Birmingham Moor Street call at The Hawthorns railway station. There was previously a railway station on Newton Road, which was located a mile away from the town centre; it was on the Grand Junction Railway that ran from Birmingham New Street to Stafford via Wolverhampton High Level and Walsall. This station closed in 1945 and, although it moved twice between 1863 and 1902, only the line remains in use for the services from Walsall to Birmingham, Wolverhampton and Liverpool Lime Street.

=== Roads ===
The M5 motorway between the West Midlands and the West Country and its junction with the M6 motorway passes through the town, making West Bromwich at the hub of Britain's motorway network. Improvements were made at the A41 junction by West Bromwich town centre after a £25 million project grant was awarded to the area to cut congestion for commuters. The junction, which is where The Expressway meets All Saints Way (A4031), currently carries over 60,000 vehicles a day and is close to junction 1 of the M5. The project involved the creation of a dual carriageway underpass beneath an improved roundabout; this work began in June 2010 and was completed in autumn 2012.

Carters Green, High Street and the beginning of Birmingham Road formed the original main route through West Bromwich as part of Thomas Telford's London to Holyhead route in the early 19th century. This later formed part of the A41 road which links London with Merseyside, taking in the Midlands, Shropshire, Warwickshire, Oxfordshire, Buckinghamshire and Hertfordshire on the way. However, the route through central West Bromwich was by-passed in 1973 on the completion of the Expressway, a two-mile (3 km) dual carriageway beginning at Carters Green and finishing at junction 1 of the recently completed M5 motorway on Birmingham Road. The original A41 road through the centre of West Bromwich was downgraded to an unclassified route.

Around this time, West Bromwich Ringway was opened which circulates the main shopping areas. The section of the Ringway, near the new Tesco, has since had traffic restrictions placed on it prohibiting use by private cars.

Further revolution came to the local road network in 1995, with the completion of the Black Country Spine Road which stretches from Carters Green to Bilston via Wednesbury, forming another new section of the A41.

=== Buses ===
West Bromwich has a large bus station managed by Transport for West Midlands and served by a large number of routes, both locally to places such as Oldbury, Smethwick and Stone Cross as well as regional bus routes to places such as Birmingham, Wolverhampton and Walsall. Stands are lettered A to Z. The main bus operators serving the bus station are West Midlands Bus and Diamond West Midlands.

=== Air ===
The nearest airport, which is approximately 16 miles (26 km) away, is Birmingham Airport, which can be reached by tram to Birmingham New Street and train to Birmingham International.

== Education ==
The largest educational provider in the town is the Central Campus of Sandwell College. This is housed in a £77 million building opened in February 2012. The college is capable of enrolling over 5,000 students each year across many curriculum areas. Central Sixth delivers the college's A-Level programme covering some thirty different subject areas. Facilities in the Central Campus include a Boeing 737 fuselage used for training air cabin crew and a dental surgery used to train dental nurses. Central Campus also offers a wide variety of apprenticeships and a small number of Higher Education programmes.

The town is served by five secondary schools: George Salter Academy, Health Futures UTC, the Phoenix Collegiate, Q3 Academy Great Barr and Sandwell Academy. A new secondary school, West Bromwich Collegiate Academy, opened in September 2019.

The town has 21 primary schools in total. Some of which are Lodge Primary School, St. John Bosco RC Primary School, Holy Trinity C of E Primary School, Ryders Green Primary School, All Saints' CofE Primary School, St Mary Magdalene, Hateley Heath and Eaton Valley.

Sandwell Academy serves the whole of West Bromwich (along with the rest of Sandwell), Phoenix Collegiate Academy serves the area around Hateley Heath, Tantany, Charlemont and Grove Vale and Stone Cross, West Midlands. George Salter Academy serves the west of the town near the border with Tipton. Q3 Academy serves the north-eastern part of the town around Great Barr.

The area was also served by Churchfields High School, approximately 1 mile (2 kilometres) north of the town centre. Due to constant closure rumours, less and less pupils began enrolling to attend the school and it was closed in July 2001. The site has since been redeveloped for housing.

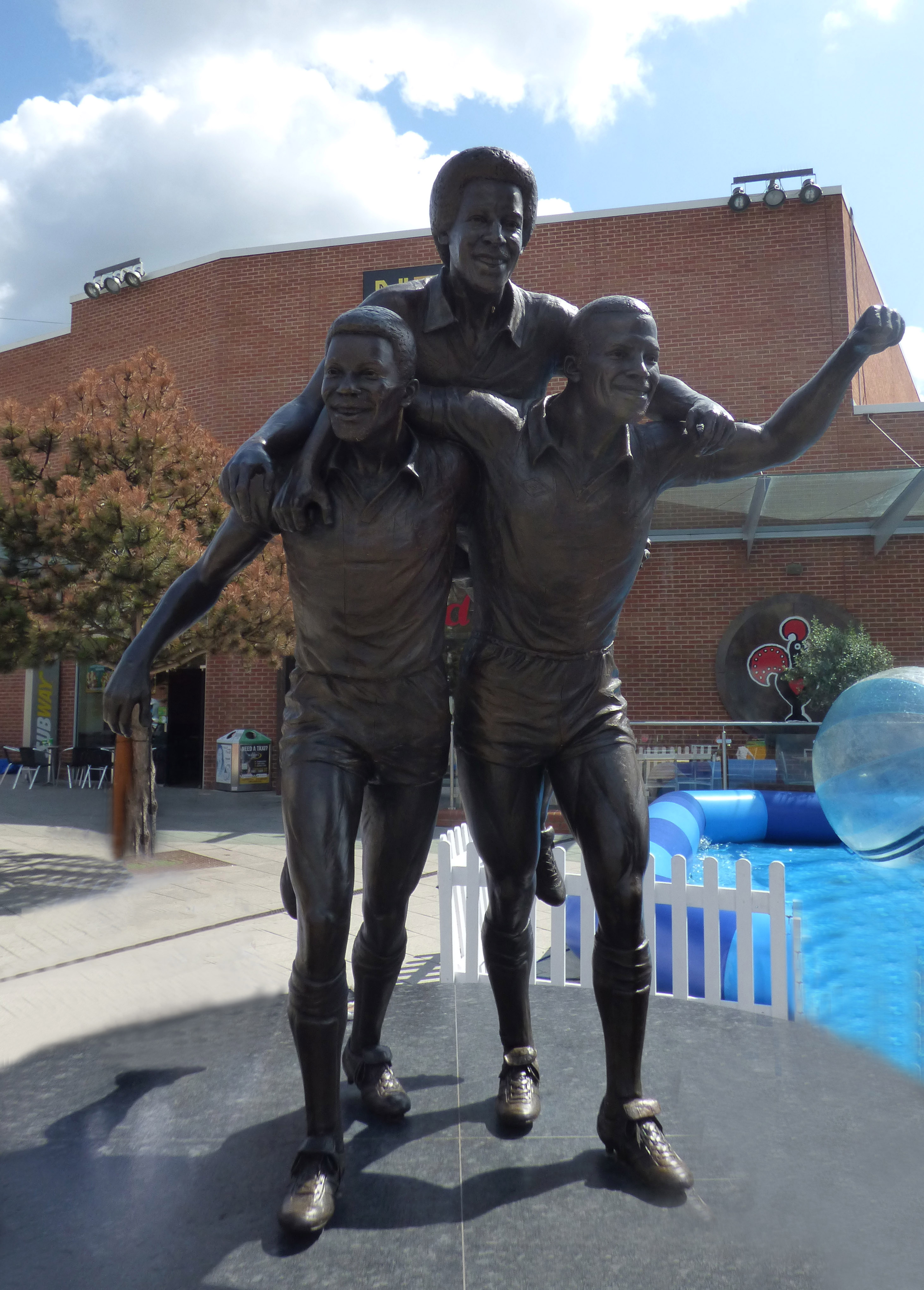
Statue of the Three Degrees by Graham Ibbeson, in West Bromwich

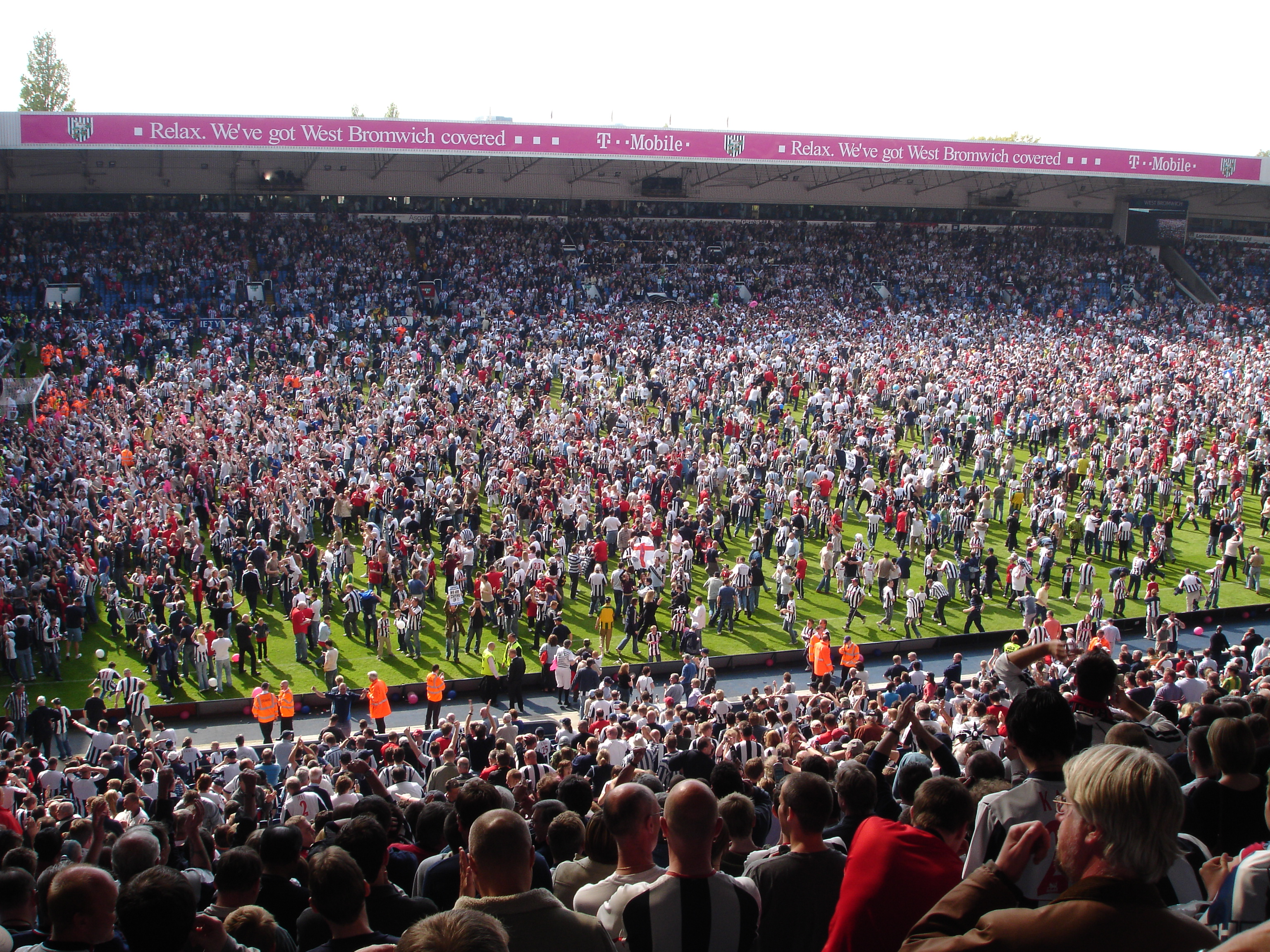
Fans spill onto the Hawthorns pitch following West Bromwich Albion's escape from relegation in 2005.

== Media ==
Local news and television programmes are provided by BBC West Midlands and ITV Central. Television signals are received from the Sutton Coldfield TV transmitter. Local radio stations are BBC Radio WM, Heart West Midlands, Capital Midlands, Smooth West Midlands, Hits Radio Birmingham and Greatest Hits Radio Birmingham & The West Midlands. The town is served by the local newspaper, Express & Star (formerly West Bromwich Chronicle).

== Sport ==
=== Football ===
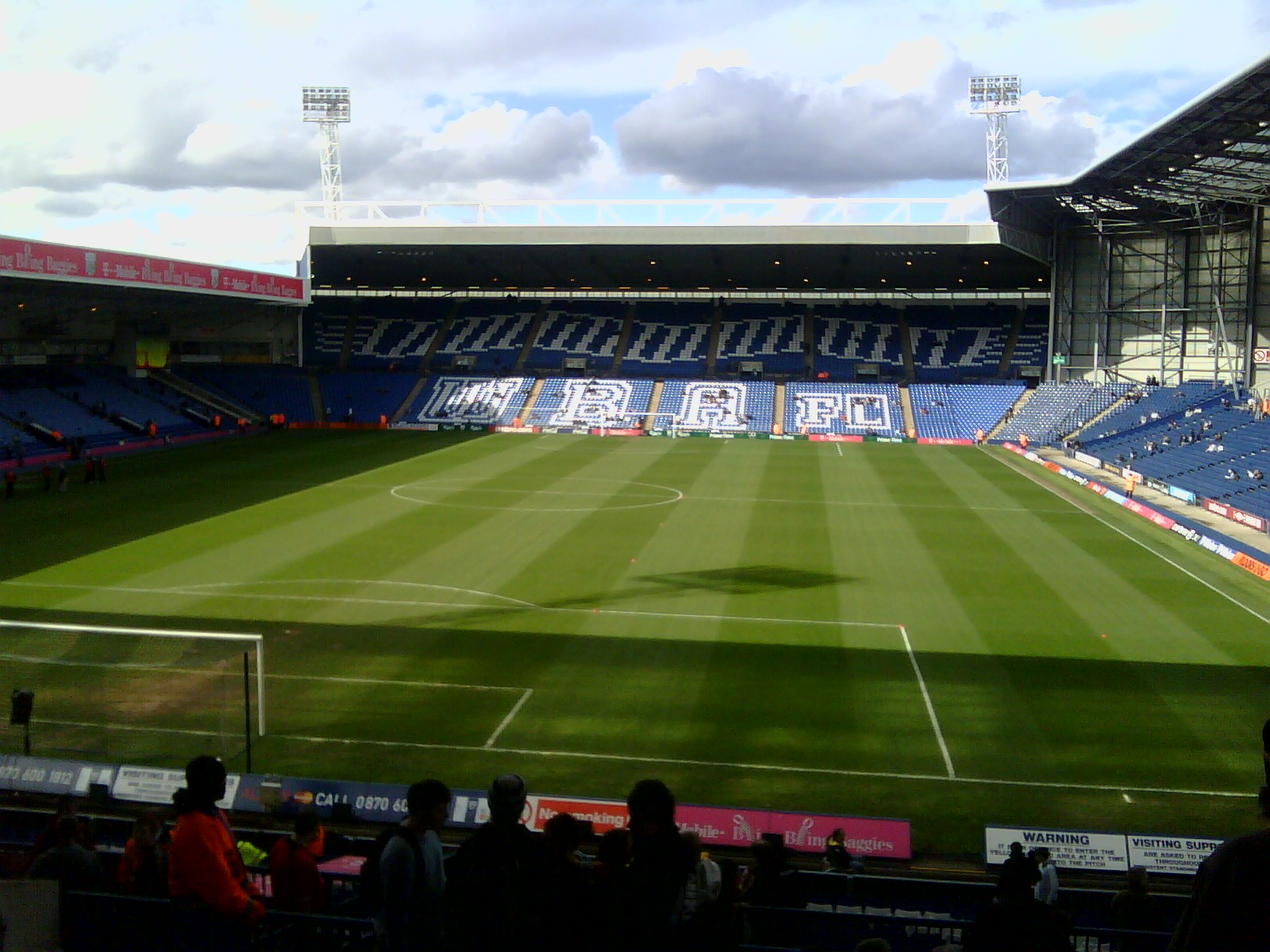
The Hawthorns, home of West Bromwich Albion F.C.

The town's football club is West Bromwich Albion. The club was founded in 1878 by workers from George Salter's Spring Works in West Bromwich. In 1888 it became one of the 12 founder members of the Football League along with their two fiercest local rivals, Aston Villa and Wolverhampton Wanderers. Albion have spent the majority of their existence in the top tier of English football. Albion were based in and around the centre of West Bromwich during their formative years, but moved further out of the town in 1900 when they switched to their current ground, The Hawthorns on Birmingham Road (on the borders of Smethwick and Handsworth). All traces of the original structures are long gone; the present structures were added to the stadium in 1979, 1994 and most recently 2001. At an altitude of 551 feet, The Hawthorns is the highest football ground (above sea level) in the country.

The club has won nine major trophies; five FA Cups (1888, 1892, 1931, 1954, 1968), one league title (1920), one Football League Cup (1966), and two Charity Shields (1920, 1954). The victory that came in 1968 was their most recent major trophy, when they won the FA Cup with a 1–0 win over Everton at Wembley Stadium. They enjoyed further success in the late 1970s and early 1980s, when they finished in the top five league positions three times in four seasons as well as reaching a UEFA Cup quarter-final. They currently play in the Championship, the second tier of English football, having been relegated from the Premier League in May 2021.

Notable former players of West Bromwich Albion include Ronnie Allen (who later had two spells as the club's manager), Bryan Robson (who was also later the club's manager), Laurie Cunningham (the first black player to play for the u-21 England national team, but died in 1989 at age 33), Tony Brown (the club's all-time leading goalscorer) and Jeff Astle (who scored the club's winning goal in the 1968 FA Cup final and remained a cult figure among Albion fans).

=== Cricket ===
The local cricket team is West Bromwich Dartmouth Cricket Club, and is based in the town. The club was founded in 1834. It is a founder member of the Birmingham and District Cricket League, the oldest cricket league in the world. They play their home games at Sandwell Valley, opposite the Hawthorns.

== Notable people ==
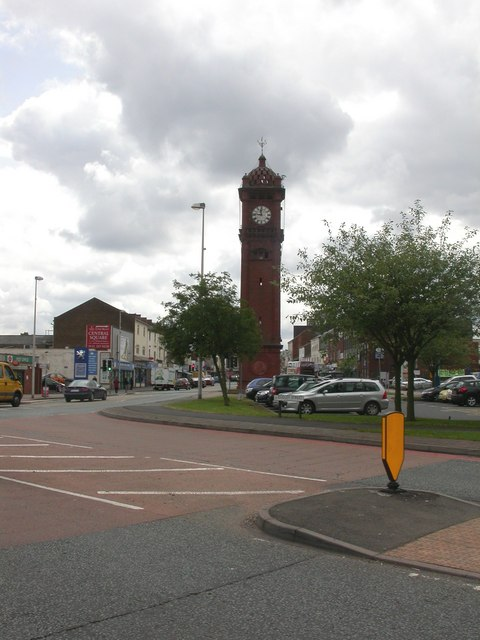
The Farley Clock Tower in memory of Reuben Farley first Mayor of West Bromwich

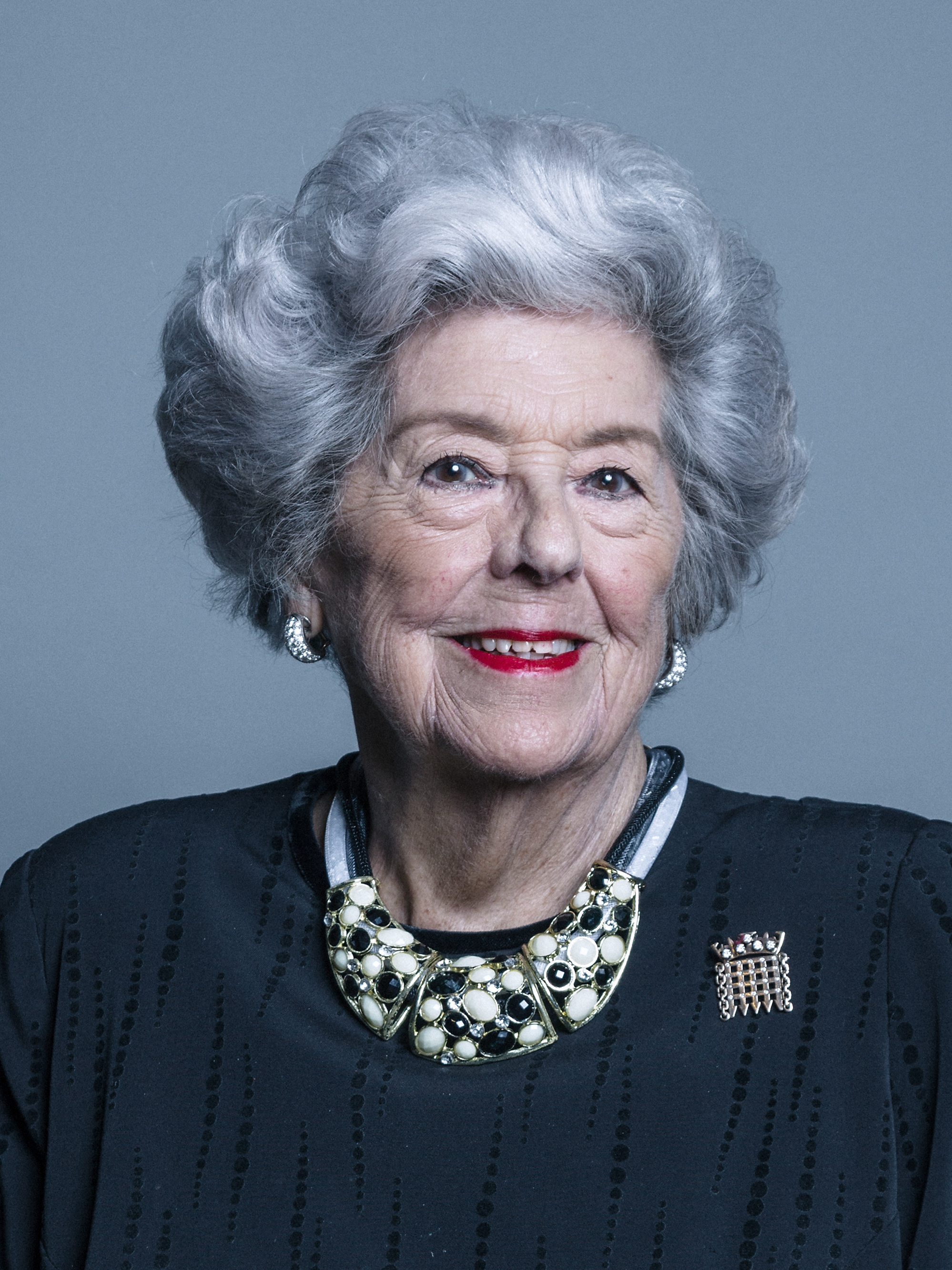
Baroness Boothroyd, 2018

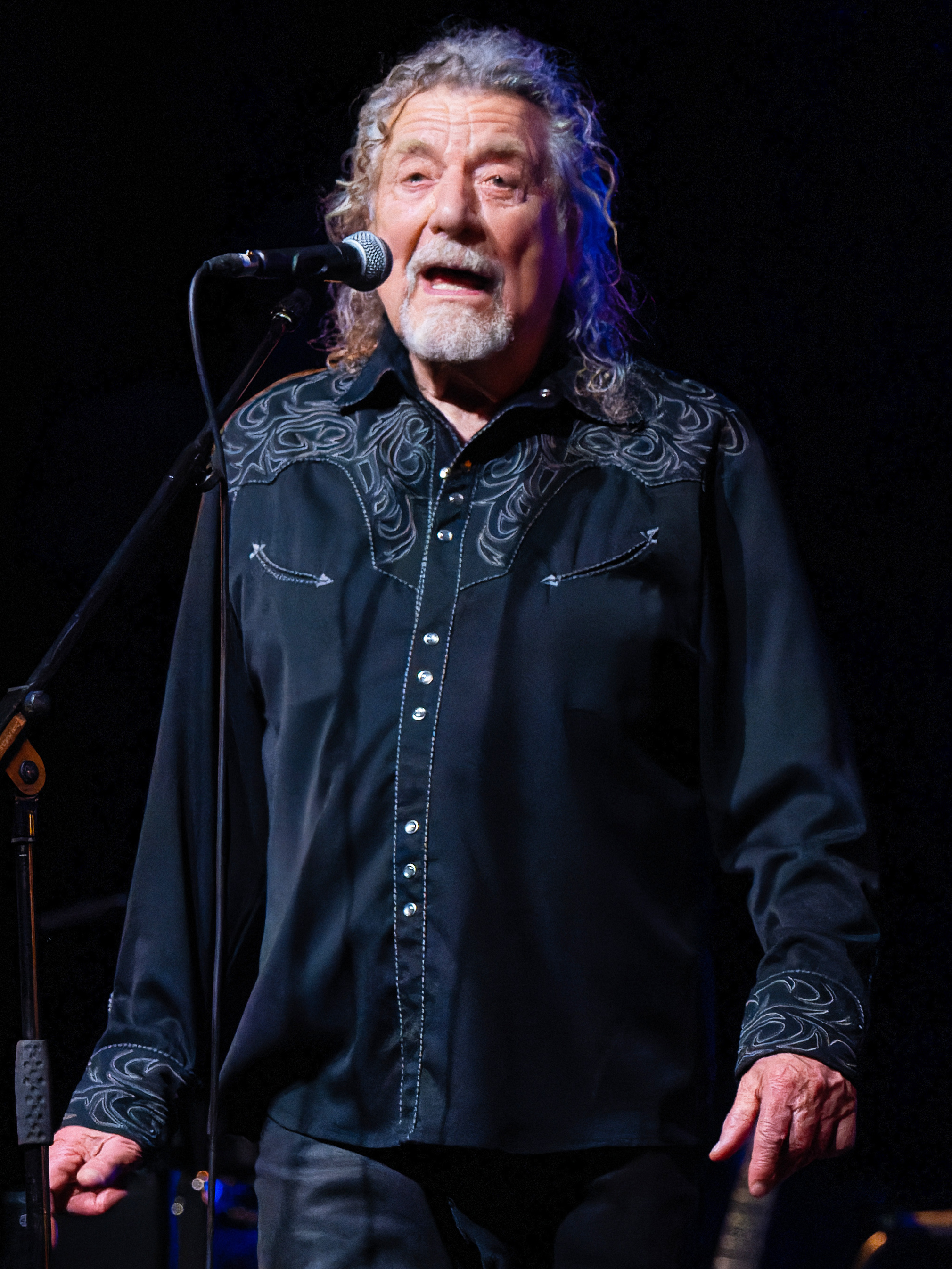
Robert Plant, 2024

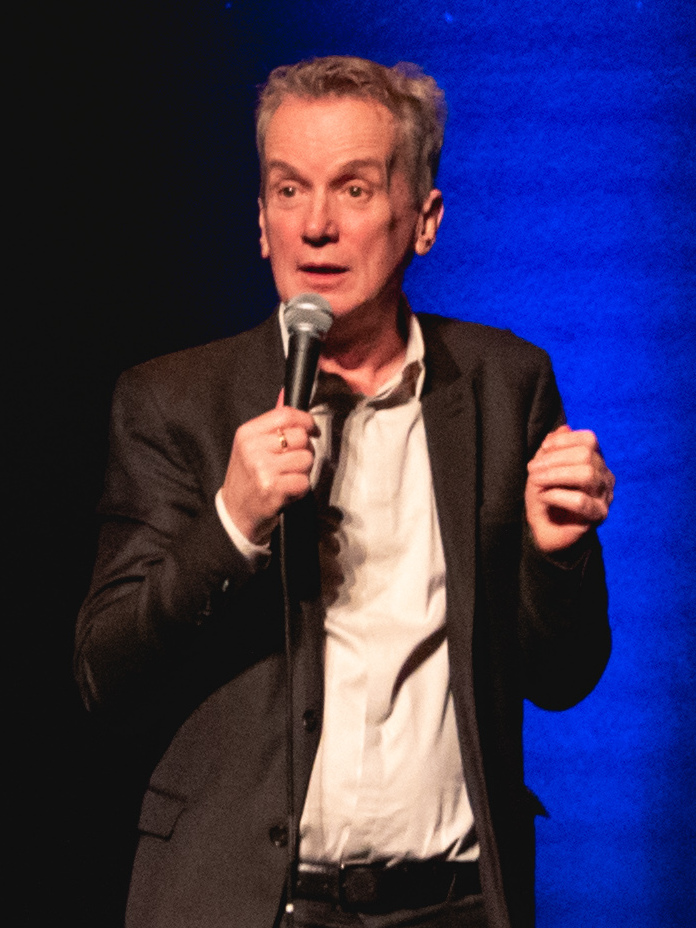
Frank Skinner, 2020

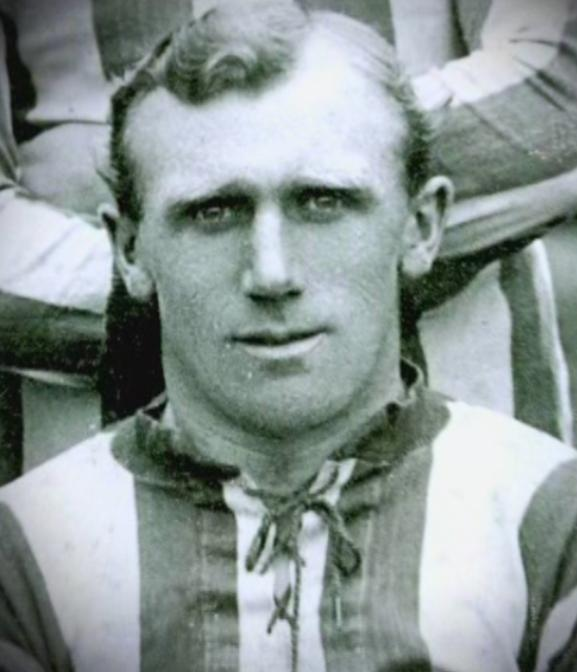
Jesse Pennington, 1912

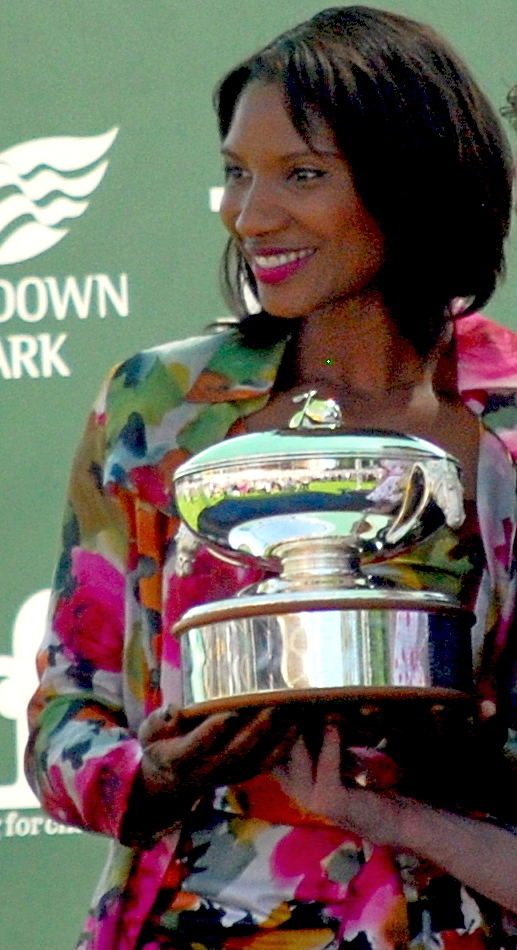
Denise Lewis, 2011

- Francis Asbury (1745 – 1816), British-American Methodist bishop
- Reuben Farley (1826–1899), businessman, politician and philanthropist; first Mayor of West Bromwich
- David Christie Murray (1847–1907), journalist, who also wrote fiction
- Sir James Ernest Spencer DL JP (1848–1937), politician and MP for West Bromwich, 1886–1906
- Emma Sproson (1867–1936), suffragette, then suffragist, socialist, politician for women's rights
- Sir Norman Bolton (1875–1965), Chief Commissioner of the North-West Frontier Province, 1920s
- John Wesley Woodward (1879–1912), professional musician cellist, died on RMS Titanic
- George Thorneycroft CBE JP (1893–1975) a British trade union leader
- Robert Edwin Phillips VC (1895–1968), Army Captain, recipient of the Victoria Cross
- Madeleine Carroll (1906–1987), actress, featured in Alfred Hitchcock's The 39 Steps (1935 film)
- Major Nichols (1914–2005), lightweight Racing bicycle manufacturer
- Noel Johnson (1916–1999), actor, original voice of Dick Barton, in BBC radio series
- Larry Stephens (1923–1959), comedy scriptwriter, co-wrote The Goon Show with Spike Milligan
- Charity Bick GM (1925–2002), dispatch rider in WWII; youngest ever recipient of the George Medal
- Peter Griffiths (1928 – 2013), politician MP for Smethwick 1964-1966
- Betty Boothroyd (1929–2023), MP for West Bromwich West 1973-2000 and Speaker of the House of Commons 1992-2000
- David Howell (1929–2017), Anglican priest and writer, vicar at local St Paul's Church, 1962 / 1971
- Graham Skidmore (1931–2021), voice artist, game show announcer, singer and photographic model
- Brian Walden (1932–2019), MP for Birmingham Ladywood 1964-1974, journalist and broadcaster
- Ray Hassall (1943–2017), politician and Lord Mayor of Birmingham, 2015 / 2016
- Cindy Kent (born 1945), former singer with The Settlers, later a radio broadcaster
- Al Atkins (born 1947), founder member of heavy metal band Judas Priest
- Robert Plant CBE (born 1948), singer and frontman of Led Zeppelin
- Anne Aston (born 1948), TV presenter and actress, lived in Old Meeting Street
- Phil Lynott (1949–1986), Thin Lizzy singer and bassist, born in Hallam Hospital
- John Byrne (born 1950), US comic book artist, raised in West Brom
- K.K. Downing (born 1951), guitarist with heavy metal band Judas Priest
- Ian Hill (born 1952), bassist with heavy metal band Judas Priest
- John Bainbridge (born 1953), author and countryside access campaigner
- Frank Skinner (born 1957), comedian, actor, presenter and writer
- Karl Shuker (born 1959), zoologist, cryptozoologist and author
- Mike Collins (born 1961), comic book artist, attended Churchfields High School
- Matthew Marsden (born ca.1972) an English and American actor, producer, singer and former model
- Cat Deeley (born 1976), TV presenter, co-presenter for ITV's This Morning
- Shaun Bailey (born 1992), politician, MP for West Bromwich West from 2019 until 2024

=== Sport ===
- Joe Reader (1866–1954), footballer who played 315 games for Albion and 1 for England
- Billy Bassett (1869–1937), footballer who played 269 games for Albion and 16 for England
- Walter Hale (1870–1956) played 69 First-class cricket matches
- Amos Adams (1880-1941), footballer who played 209 games for Albion
- Fred Everiss (1882–1951), Secretary-manager of West Bromwich Albion for 46 years from 1902 to 1948
- Jesse Pennington (1883–1970), footballer, played 455 games for Albion and 25 for England
- Ken Hodgkisson (1933–2018), footballer, played 357 games, including 21 for Albion and 336 for Walsall
- Jana Bellin (born 1947), chess grandmaster and a medical doctor specialising in anaesthetics, lives locally
- Phil Parkes (born 1947), football goalkeeper, played over 450 games, including 303 for Wolves
- Chic Bates (1949–2025), footballer, played 386 games incl. 294 for Shrewsbury Town which he managed
- Philip Oliver (born 1956), cricketer, played 89 First-class cricket matches
- Alan Birch (born 1956), footballer who played 496 games, including 171 for Walsall
- Horace Notice (born 1957), amateur and professional heavyweight boxer of the 1980s
- Dave Evans (born 1958), footballer who played 516 games, mainly for Halifax Town and Bradford City
- Steve Lynex (born 1958), footballer, played ca. 400 games, including 213 for Leicester City
- Giles Toogood (born 1961), cricketer, who played 34 First-class cricket matches
- Paul Birch (1962–2009), footballer, played over 400 games, including 173 for Aston Villa and 142 for Wolves
- Dean Glover (born 1963), footballer who played 446 games incl. 363 for Port Vale which he managed
- Gary Bull (born 1966), footballer, played over 450 games, most for Barnet and Grantham Town
- Dean Smith (born 1971), football manager and former player who played 566 games
- Denise Lewis DBE (born 1972), heptathlete and gold medallist at the 2000 Summer Olympics
- Lee Woodley (born 1976), welterweight boxer, known as Young Mutley
- James Chambers (born 1980), footballer who has played 395 games
- Nathan Blissett (born 1990), footballer who has played 420 games
- Mal Benning (born 1993), footballer who has played over 400 games, mainly for Mansfield Town

== See also ==
- West Bromwich Building Society
- Charlemont and Grove Vale
- West Bromwich Mountaineering Club

== Sources ==
- 'West Bromwich: Social life', A History of the County of Stafford: Volume 17: Offlow hundred (part) (1976), pp. 70–74. URL: https://www.british-history.ac.uk/report.aspx?compid=36169. Date accessed: 23 April 2008.
