= Plaza Nueva =

Plaza Nueva ('New Square') may refer to the following places in Spain:

- Plaza Nueva, Bilbao
- Plaza Nueva, Seville
- Plaza Nueva, Toledo
- Plaza Nueva, Vitoria
