= Tantany =

Area of West Bromwich, England

Coordinates: 52.526°N 1.997°W

Tantany is a residential area of West Bromwich. It is situated to the north of the town centre and consists predominantly of council housing constructed during the 1920s.

== History ==
It was West Bromwich's first council housing development when the first houses were built there in 1920.

A small number of houses on the southern side of the estate were demolished during the 1970s to make way for a dual carriageway that by-passed West Bromwich town centre, though a direct road link between the estate and the town centre does still exist.

Several houses on Tantany were damaged in air raids during the Second World War, and were rebuilt afterwards. A further few houses were demolished during the 1990s and replaced by new private homes, but the bulk of the pre-war housing is still in existence. When a number of homes on the nearby Hateley Heath estate were demolished, a number of families were moved to Tantany.

== Facilities ==
It is served by community facilities including West Bromwich Baptist Church.
