= Oak House, West Bromwich =

Historic house museum in West Bromwich, England

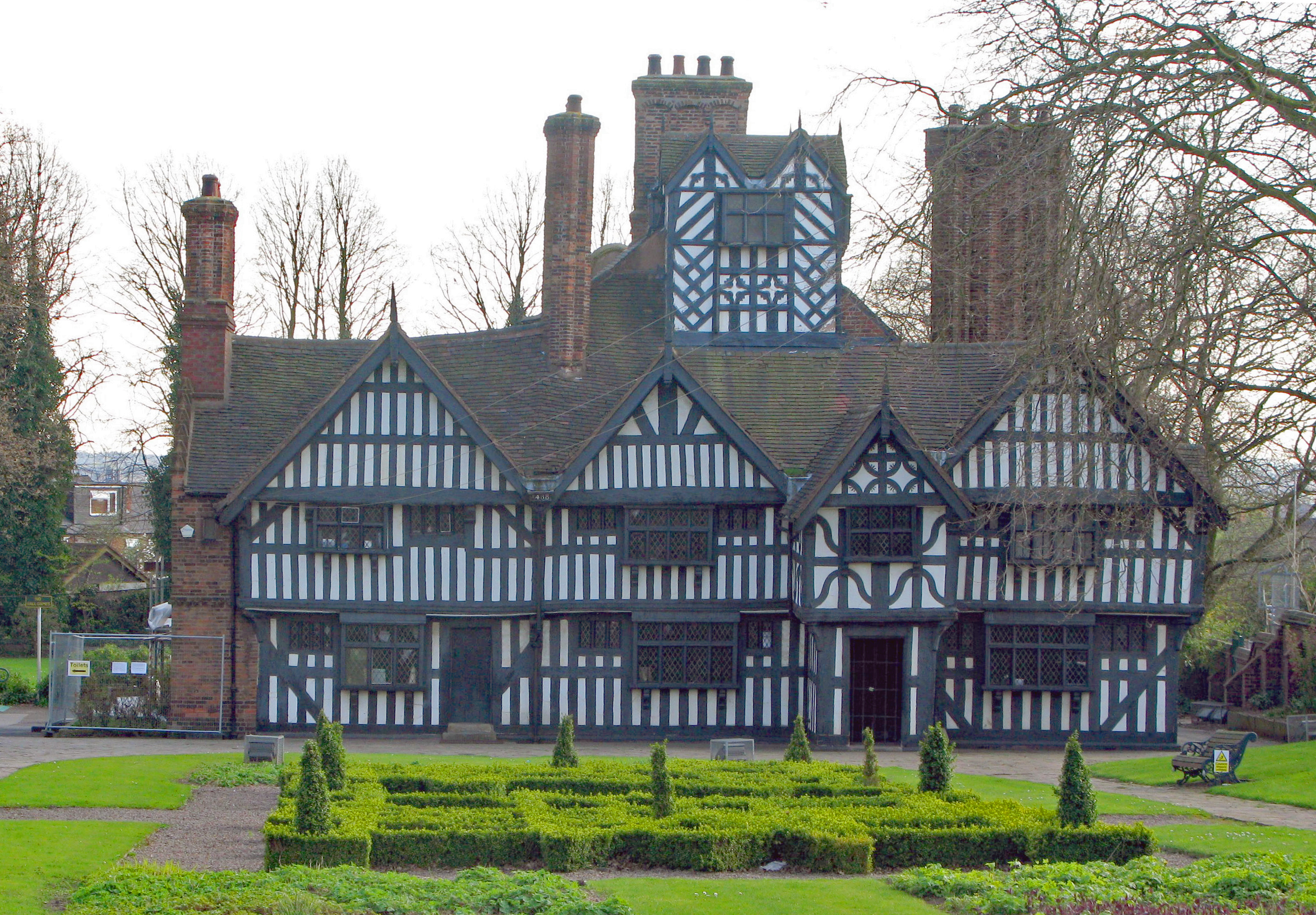
- Oak House, West Bromwich

- Location within West Midlands county
- 52°30′56″N 2°00′15″W
- Location: West Bromwich

History
- Built: c. 1620

Site notes
- Area: West Midlands county
- Architectural style: Tudor
- Owner: Sandwell Council

Listed Building – Grade I
- Official name: Oak House, West Bromwich
- Designated: 27 September 2024
- Reference no.: 1228226

Listed Building – Grade II*
- Designated: 25 February 1949

The Oak House is a timber framed building dating from the early seventeenth century that is located in West Bromwich, England.

The Oak House was built in c. 1620, and while the original owners are not known, the family most closely associated with it are the Turtons, who were living there by 1634; the Turtons also built brick additions to the rear of the house during the 1650s. The house remained in the Turton family until 1768 when it passed to William Whyley, the "natural son" of John Turton.

It is thought to have taken its name from an oak which stood on the green in front of it and was burnt down around 1800, though it could have been named after the oak woodland that once surrounded the house. The last John Turton advised William Whyley to fell the trees, and in 1768 many were used to make lock-gates for the Birmingham Canal, which was then being built through West Bromwich. Very few oaks remained in 1836. John Wesley preached at the house on two occasions in the late 18th century when it was in the ownership of William Whyley. It remained in the Whyley family until 1837. Following a succession of owners, Reuben Farley (three times Mayor of West Bromwich) purchased the property.

Alderman Reuben Farley was one of the towns greatest benefactors. He purchased the Oak House with the intention of making it his private residence, but resolved to present it to the town as a museum. The leading architects in West Bromwich, Messrs. Wood and Kendrick, were employed with the task of restoring the house. Skilled craftsmanship ensured the outstanding quality of the restoration and the museum was formally opened on 25 July 1898; gardens and a bowling green were also laid out.

To mark the fiftieth anniversary of the gift, the corporation decided to convert the Oak House into a period house with antique furnishings; the formal reopening took place in 1951.

In 1949 the house was protected as a Grade II* listed building. It became a Grade I listed building on 27 September 2024.
