= Reuben Farley =

English businessman and politician

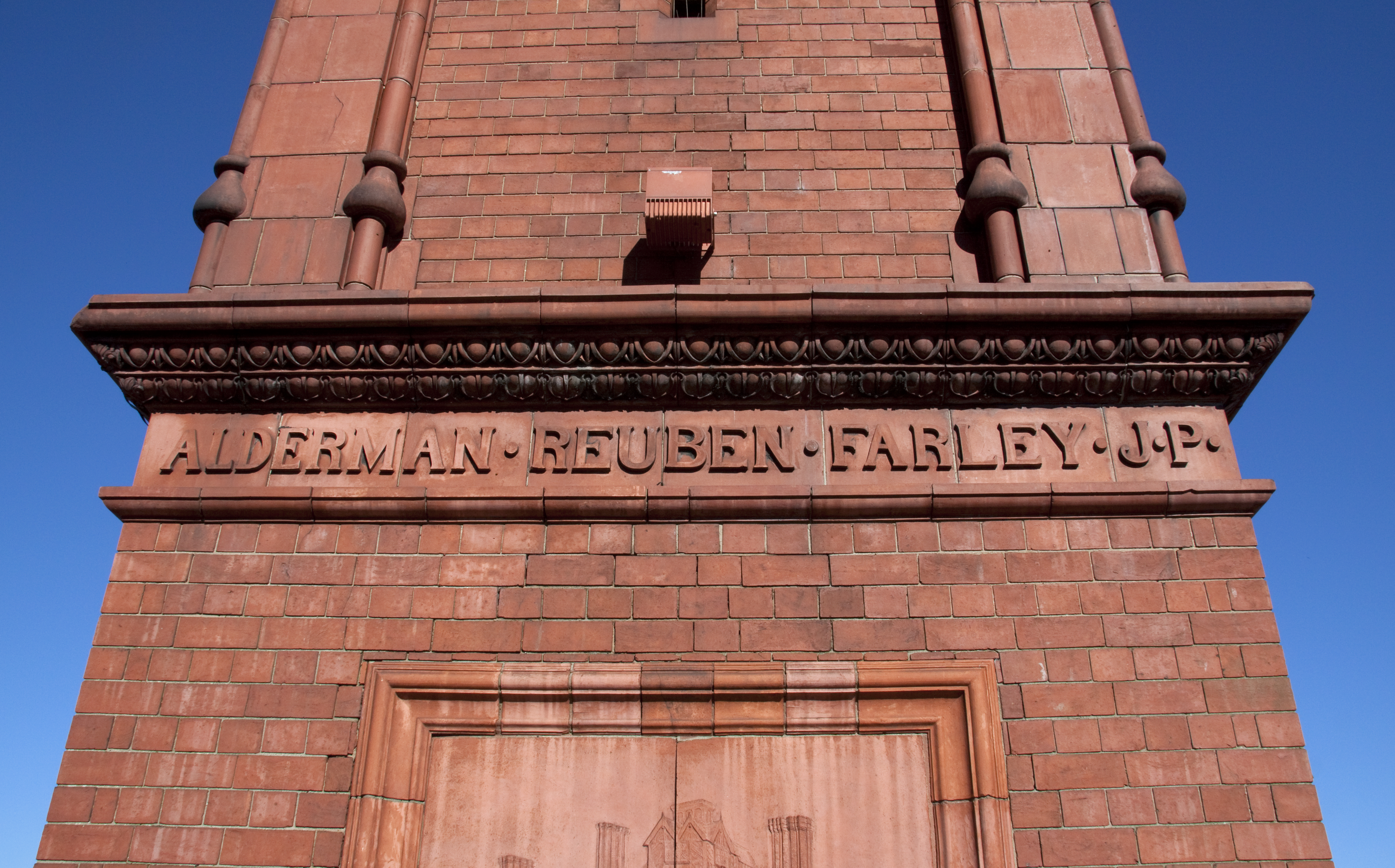
Memorial to Farley on the clock tower erected in his name

Reuben Farley (17 January 1826 – 1899) was an English businessman, politician and philanthropist. He was the first Mayor of West Bromwich and served for four terms. He was also the first freeman of West Bromwich and the town's Farley Clock Tower stands in his honour.

== Early life ==
He was the eighth of ten children born to Elizabeth Farley and mining engineer Thomas Farley (1781–1830). Farley was a pupil at Borwicks Heath Academy and an active member of the West Bromwich Institution for the Advancement of Knowledge. After a mining apprenticeship, Farley took over Dunkirk Colliery when he was 21. By 1861 he bought the Summit Foundry with his brother-in-law George Taylor. The foundry became one of the largest of its kind in South Staffordshire, and the firm won a medal at the 1897 Brussels Exhibition.

Farley played a leading role in several local limited companies. He was a leading shareholder and Chairman in Fellows Morton & Clayton, a large canal carrier which his brother-in-law Joshua Fellows had founded, and Edwin Danks & Co. an important local maker of boilers and boats. He was a director of the Sandwell Park Colliery Co. and later an active Chairman of the Hamstead Colliery Co.

His labour relations attitudes were stern. He condemned the eight-hour day as ‘interference with the liberty of the subject’ He also criticised union organisers at the Summit Foundry for alienating employers from workmen. However, he provided excursions and pensions in his own firm and experienced little labour trouble.

== Civic work ==
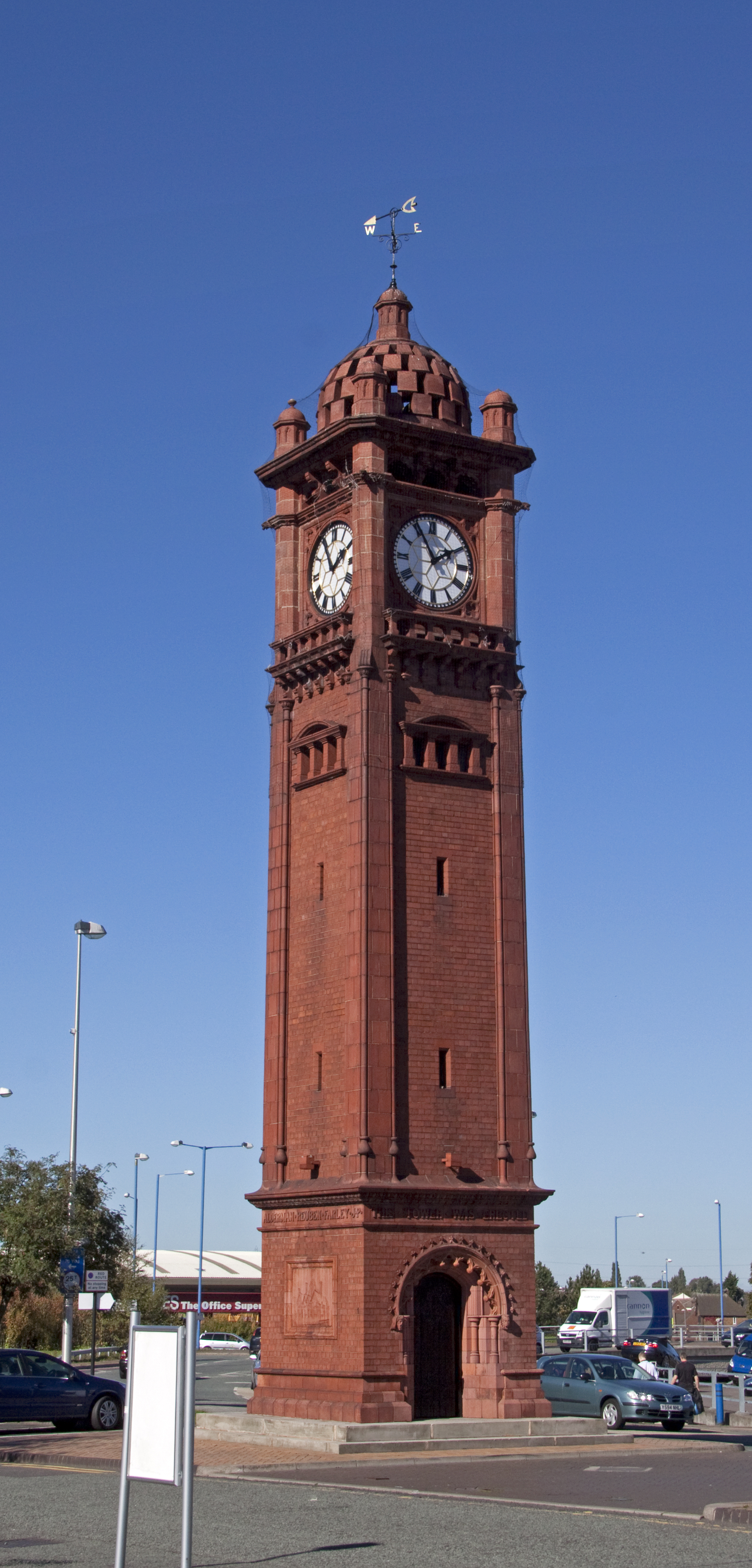
The Farley Clock Tower in West Bromwich.

He had been urged to stand for parliament when West Bromwich acquired its own seat in 1885, but Farley declined the opportunity. Instead he channeled his formidable energies into the betterment of his native town. He felt obliged to ‘make the lives of the people brighter and happier’ He believed civic improvement assisted prosperity and prevented business irresponsibility and excessive demands by working men.

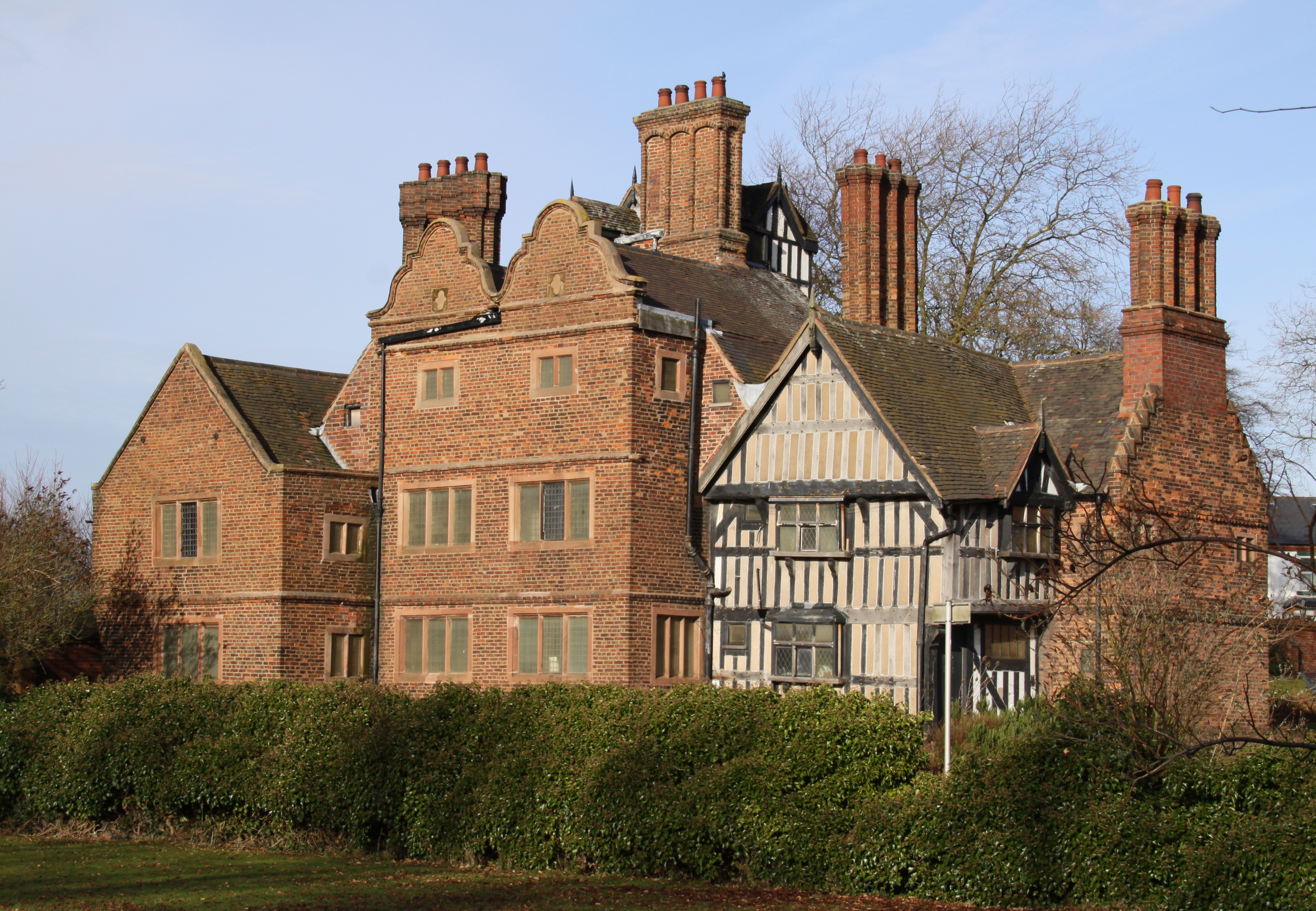
Oak House, which Farley gave to the town as a museum

He bought Oak House, West Bromwich with the intention of making it his private residence, but resolved to present it to the town as a museum.

Farley played a key role in William Legge, 5th Earl of Dartmouth’s gift to the town of Dartmouth Park in 1878. He was a county magistrate from 1879, and one of the first borough JPs of West Bromwich. When West Bromwich was incorporated in 1882 Farley's was the only name suggested for the mayor's chair. He filled it four more times and received particular credit for discouraging partisanship in council affairs.

Voluntary societies as diverse as the Rifle Volunteers, friendly societies, a choral society and West Bromwich Albion Football Club found Farley an active officer and major contributor. For a quarter of a century he attended almost every committee meeting of the West Bromwich Building Society.

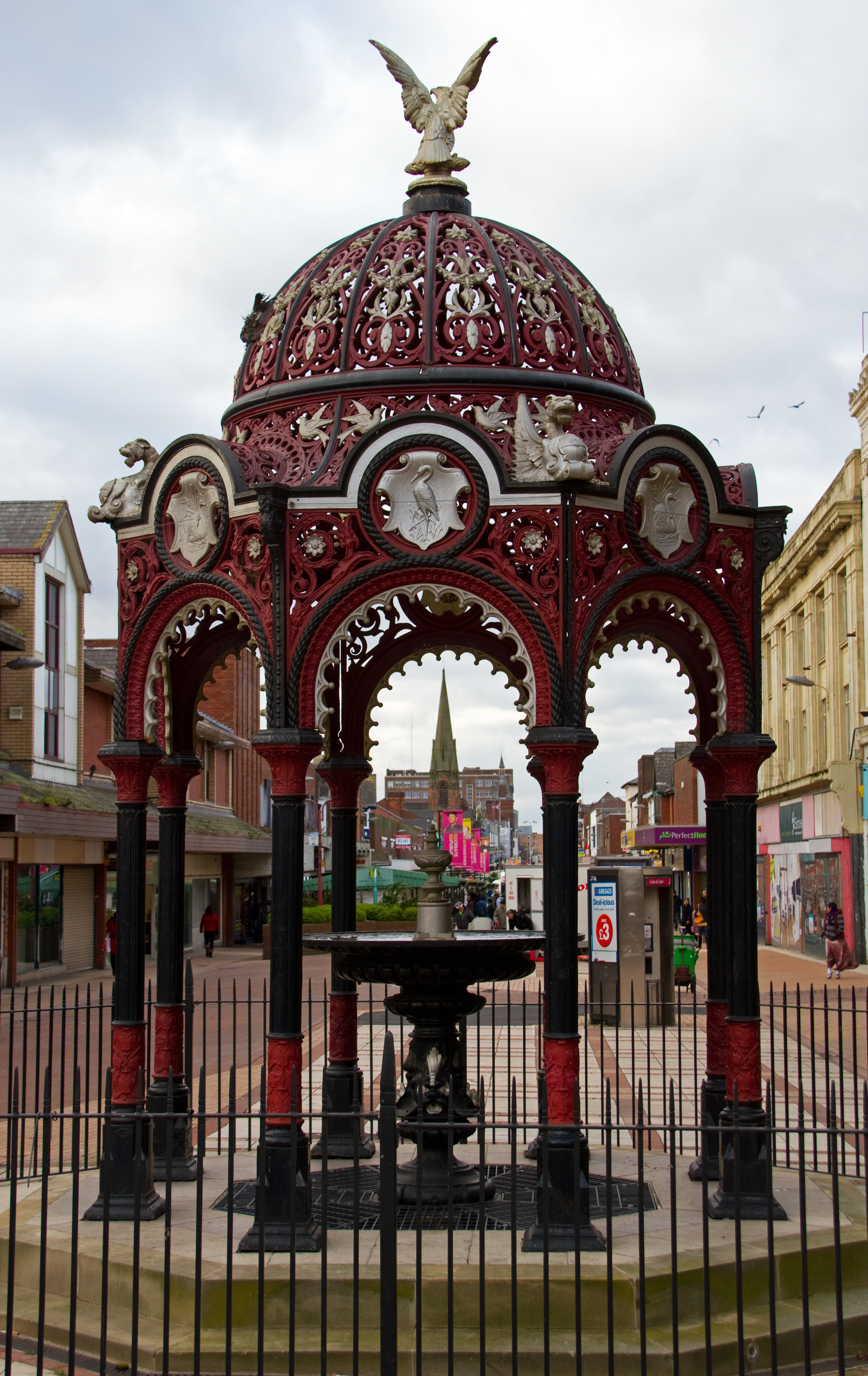
The Elizabeth Farley Fountain, built by Farley in 1885

On the death of his mother Elizabeth he commissioned for the town a drinking fountain in 1885 as a memorial to her.

West Bromwich made Farley its first freeman in 1896 and erected a clock tower in his honour a year later.

== Personal life ==
He married 3 times:

- Hannah Duce, 1867. The 38-year-old daughter of a General Lock Manufacturer.
- Elizabeth Haines 1879, The daughter of a Coal and Iron Master.
- Harriet Fellows, 19 October 1887 at Sedgley, Staffs. They had five children, 3 sons and 2 daughters.

He died in 1899 age 73 and is buried in Heath Lane Cemetery, along with Harriet.
