= West Bromwich Building Society =

Financial institution in the United Kingdom

- Company type: Building Society (mutual)
- Industry: Banking and Financial services
- Founded: 1849; 177 years ago
- Headquarters: West Bromwich, England
- Number of locations: 35
- Key people: John Maltby (chair); Jonathan Westhoff (chief executive)
- Products: Retail banking, Savings, Mortgages
- Revenue: ▲£95.6 million (2022)
- Operating income: ▲£31.8 million (2022)
- Net income: ▲£26.2 million (2022)
- Total assets: ▼£5,689.3 million (2022)
- Total equity: ▲£430.5 million (2022)
- Members: 407,000 (2022)
- Number of employees: 633 (2022); 626 (2021)
- Website: Official website

West Bromwich Building Society, commonly referred to as the West Brom or West Brom Building Society, is the eighth largest building society in the UK, with its headquarters in West Bromwich, England. It is a member of the Building Societies Association.

The Society was formed in 1849 and remained a very local society for over 100 years. In 2024, the West Brom celebrated its 175th anniversary, making it one of the oldest building societies still in existence today.

== History ==
=== A local Society ===
The meeting to propose a building society for West Bromwich was held at the Paradise Street Methodist Meeting rooms on 23 April 1849.

It is believed that the West Bromwich Permanent Building Society formally opened for business later that year. There were 20 men at that first meeting, all steeped in Methodism, and comprised local tradesmen and skilled craftsmen -retailers, a boat builder, boot maker, blacksmith, glass cutter. One of these was appointed the first Secretary, James Sharp, a grocer. A couple of years later, hardly any of the original names were mentioned again and the trustees were drawn more from the middle class. The only figure of note in those early years was Reuben Farley, a prominent industrialist and later the first Mayor of West Bromwich. He was not one of the original 20 but he signed the earliest remaining accounts (1851) and from 1858 to his retirement in 1897 signed the accounts as president.

The aims of the Society were no different to those of other early societies. Intentions to enable the working man to be his own landlord and "enjoy the privilege of exercising the franchise" were expressed in the 1852 annual report. The extension of the franchise was a common theme of the early building societies and reflected the aims of the Freehold Land Societies. Lending was only for houses and not for building developers or commercial property The Society confined itself to its immediate locality and growth was often slow – between 1879 and 1909 assets grew from £170,000 to no more than £209,000.

=== The Inter-war Years ===
The inter-war period saw more substantial growth in assets, from £0.3m to £3.8m in 1939. This reflected the growth of West Bromwich town, some modest geographical movement and, of course, the substantial increase in home ownership. The Society dominated West Bromwich; in 1928 75% of all the town's mortgages were with the Society, accounting for half of its total business. Most of the remainder was in Birmingham, Smethwick and neighboring small towns. In that year the Society opened its first branches, in Smethwick, Oldbury and Tipton; they all proved profitable so in 1931 a further branch was opened in Handsworth. This was hardly an ambitious geographical move – it was done partly because other societies were coming to Birmingham and getting nearer to West Bromwich. The four branches only opened part time for three days a week; indeed, a 1961 advert had the branches still opening on this part-time basis.

=== The Dilkes years – a regional Society ===
The change from a successful but local building society into a major regional society was dramatic, and down to one man. Frank Dilkes was appointed Assistant Manager in 1958, General Manager in 1961 and managing director in 1965. Once he became managing director, he was able to convince the Board to start an expansion policy. This including modernizing the administration, looking for a purpose-built HQ and, above all, opening branches. The first step was to convert the four sub-offices to full branches. Within three years Dilkes strengthened the position in the Midlands by opening nine branches, from Wolverhampton across to Leicester and Coventry. Further afield, branches were opened in Chester and Manchester supported by collecting offices as far afield as Norwich, Sunderland and Blackpool. At the end of 1971 there were 37 branches and by 1978 this had increased to 67 branches covering the Midlands, Shropshire and North Wales, also Hampshire and Bedfordshire. The Society ranked as the 25th by size with over £100m of assets. The West Bromwich also began to diversify, offering loans for car purchase and in the late 1980s a full range of insurance products. When Dilkes retired as managing director in 1983, the Society had £338m of assets and 90 branches.

=== Crisis ===
Rising house prices, a substantial increase in its commercial property lending, supported by an increase in wholesale funding took the West Bromwich's assets up to a peak of £9.6 billion in 2008. That date marked the start of the international financial collapse epitomized in the building society movement by the failure of the Northern Rock. The rising cost of wholesale funding combined with asset provisions meant the Society incurred a £49m pre-tax loss. The Society's credit rating was downgraded and there was speculation over its independent future. The West Bromwich was forced to move away from its previous diversification programme and return to the "more tried and trusted" building society model with its clear focus on retail savings and prime residential mortgages. The "back to basics" approach included a reduction in wholesale funding, a withdrawal from commercial lending and a planned reduction of at least a quarter of the Society's cost base.

=== Recovery ===
Wholesale funding fell from 32% in 2008 to 11% in 2010 and the asset base was reduced more than 40% to £5.6 billion in 2015, a level broadly maintained since. However, the legacy of the commercial property lending, which incurred substantial losses, took longer to unwind; it took a decade to reduce lending of £1.7 billion in 2009 down to £400m. In his 2020 Annual Report, the Chief Executive reflected that "over the last decade the Society has been on a simple mission…to repair our business model and transform the balance sheet to be reflective of what a building society should be - an organisation that lends savers’ money for the purpose of putting people in homes in a way that is safe and responsible." It had become a more compact Society, still 7th by size in the industry, with 36 branches, 95% of its lending for home ownership, and with a portfolio of rental residential property.

== Sponsorship ==
Between 1997 and 2004, West Bromwich Building Society was the main kit sponsor of English football club West Bromwich Albion.
