= Dartmouth Park, West Bromwich =

Public park in West Bromwich, England

Dartmouth Park
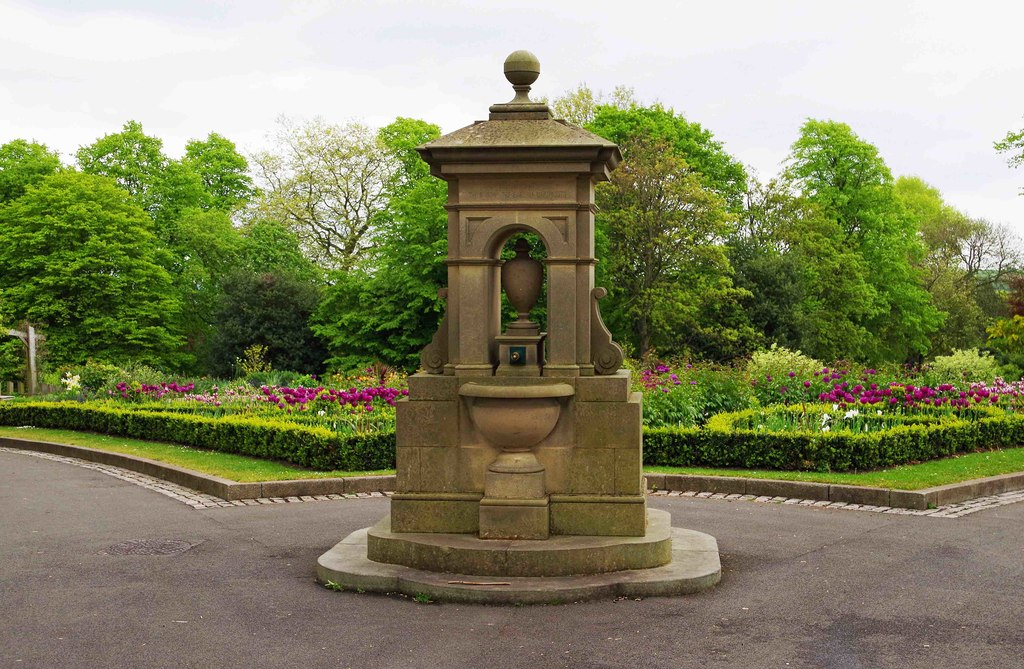
- The drinking fountain
- Interactive map of Dartmouth Park
- Location: West Bromwich, West Midlands
- OS grid: SP 014 913
- Coordinates: 52°31′14.2″N 1°58′54.5″W
- Area: 23.9 hectares (59 acres)
- Opened: 1878
- Operator: Sandwell Metropolitan Borough Council
- Designation: Grade II
- Website: www.friendsofdartmouthpark.org.uk

Dartmouth Park is a public park in West Bromwich, in West Midlands, England, about 0.5 miles (0.8 km) east of the town centre and west of Sandwell Valley Country Park. The park was opened in 1878. It is owned and operated by Sandwell Metropolitan Borough Council, and is listed Grade II in Historic England's Register of Parks and Gardens. Its area is 23.9 hectares (59 acres).

== History and description ==
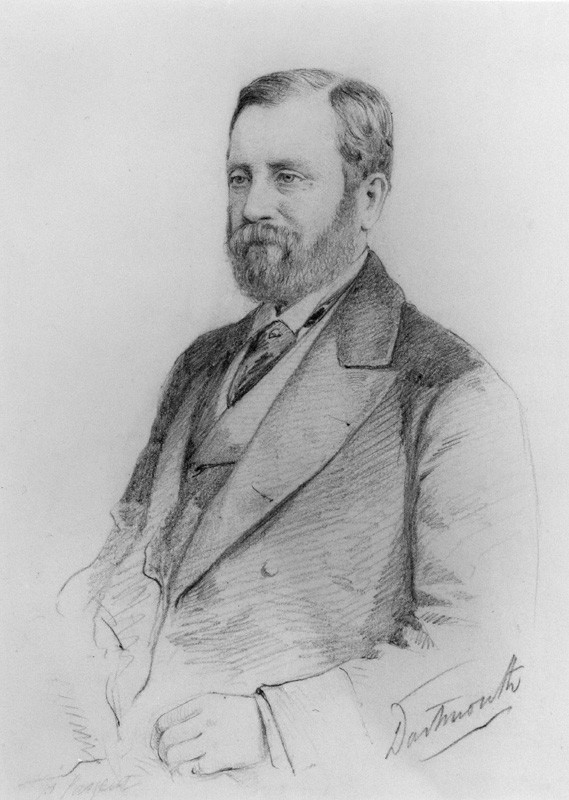
William Legge, 5th Earl of Dartmouth

Reuben Farley, an alderman of West Bromwich, wrote to William Legge, 5th Earl of Dartmouth in 1876, proposing the leasing of land from the Dartmouth estate to create a public park in West Bromwich. After further correspondence and meetings, it was agreed that 20.2 hectares (50 acres) of land at Cooper's Hill in West Bromwich, one of two sites offered, be leased for 99 years with a nominal rent of £1 per year.

Budgets were set for building a lodge and laying out the park. An advertisement in The Gardeners' Chronicle invited designs from landscape gardeners, which was won by John Maclean of Donington Hall in Leicestershire. Sites within the park were fixed in January 1877.The Earl donated trees and shrubs and a fountain from his home, Patshull Hall.

The park was opened on 3 June 1878 by Reuben Farley and the Earl of Dartmouth; about 40,000 people attended, and the day was observed as a general holiday. The Earl of Dartmouth donated more land in 1887, where a boating pool and boathouse were created.

=== Twentieth century ===
The freehold of the park was given to the people in 1919. A war memorial, funded by public subscription, was unveiled by William Legge, 6th Earl of Dartmouth in 1923. (It was listed Grade II in 1987.) In 1933 a new bandstand replaced the original structure. From the 1940s the refreshment rooms were run by the former footballer Joe Johnson, who had played for West Bromwich Albion, and his wife. This attractive circular building was ultimately destroyed by fire.

In the 1970s the Expressway (part of the A41 road), linking the north of West Bromwich with the M5 motorway, was opened. This removed about 2.4 hectares (5.9 acres) from the south-west of the park, removing the tennis courts and golf course. The original entrance from Herbert Street was lost; the gates, gate piers and lodge at this entrance survive in a small area of land on the other side of the Expressway. A concrete footbridge was built over the Expressway to the park from Herbert Street. These changes, and the development of Sandwell Valley Country Park, made Dartmouth Park less popular.

=== Restoration ===
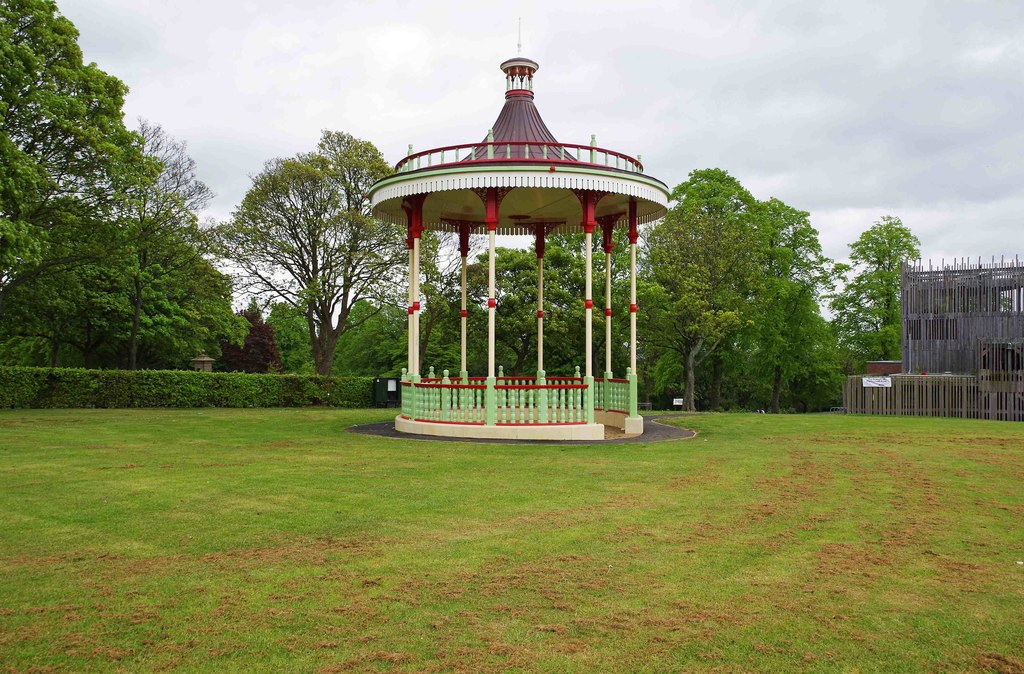
The bandstand in 2017

The park received funding for restoration from the National Lottery Heritage Fund and Sandwell Metropolitan Borough Council in 2008. The improvements included a new bandstand, on the site of the original bandstand; a children's play area; installation of lighting on a pathway through the park; and paths added and rerouted, with resurfacing of existing paths. After restoration work, the park was officially re-opened in September 2014.

== Facilities ==
Facilities include ornamental lakes, floral displays, outdoor gym equipment, a children's play area and a sensory garden. There is a pavilion with refreshments, toilets, a community room and a viewing tower.
