= New Square, West Bromwich =

New Square
- Location: West Bromwich, England
- Coordinates: 52.52004°N 1.99155°W
- Opened: 11 July 2013
- Num. of anchor tenants: 30+ (Tesco, Primark)
- Floor area: 473,000 square feet (43,900 m^{2})
- Website: newsquarewestbromwich.co.uk

New Square, West Bromwich is a 473,000 square feet (43,900 m^{2}) new shopping and leisure venue in West Bromwich in the West Midlands, England which opened July 2013.

As of December 2016, New Square has over 40 shops and restaurants open including Tesco Extra, Card Factory, Charlie Browns, Claire's, Clarks, Diechmann, Funky Monkeys, H&M, JD Sports, Next, O2, Odeon Cinemas, Pandora, Peacocks, Post Office, OneBelow, Primark, River Island, Schuh, Select, Shoe Zone, Shopmobility, Specsavers, Sports Direct, Tessuti, The Entertainer, The West Brom, Timpson (Inside Tesco), Thomson, Vodafone, Warren James, Yours.
