= Plaza Nueva, Toledo =

The Plaza Nueva of Toledo is a square located in the Jewish quarter of Toledo, in Castile-La Mancha, Spain. Is located between the synagogues and the Monastery of San Juan de los Reyes. Several restaurants and a teashop are located there. There is also a sculpture made by Alberto Sánchez in the corner of the square.
