= Charlemont with Grove Vale =

Political ward in England

Coordinates: 52.542°N 1.964°W

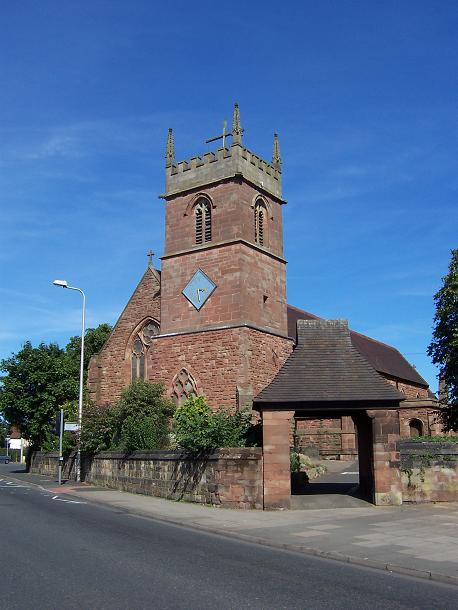
All Saints Church, Charlemont

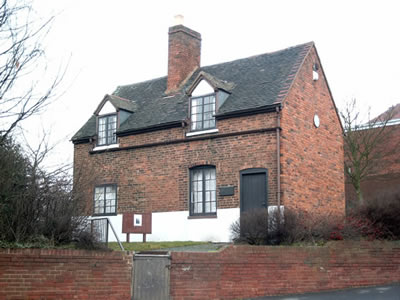
Bishop Asbury Cottage.

Charlemont with Grove Vale is a political ward in the Metropolitan Borough of Sandwell, in the parliamentary constituency of West Bromwich. This Sandwell ward population as taken at the 2011 census was 11,964.

The ward is made up of several neighbourhoods including Charlemont Farm, Bustlehome Mill, Church Vale, and the leafier neighbourhoods of Charlemont, Bird End, Wigmore and Grove Vale. It also covers part of the Sandwell Valley.

== History ==
The area became known as 'Charly Mount' by c.1723 and was home to Charlemont Hall, proceeded by Crump Hall. The hall stood on the east side of the present day Charlemont Crescent until 1948.

The ward was also home to Wigmore School, erected in 1872, for the maintenance and education of Children chargeable to the Walsall and West Bromwich Poor Law Unions. The buildings, situated on a hill overlooking the Tame Valley, were erected in the Elizabethan style, and included an Infirmary. Following the Local Government Act 1929, all poor law responsibility was transferred to the Local Authority, and Wigmore was administered by the Education Committee. From 1935, Wigmore became an "Approved School" which continued until the 1960s when it was transferred for use as Sandwell Council Offices. The building failed to get listed building status and despite local pressure was demolished by Sandwell Council in 2002, to make way for a new housing development. The Gatehouse is still in existence.

With private and council residential developments growing in the 1920s, an infant school opened in the area in 1929 and was followed a year later by new junior and senior schools. The buildings were expanded in 1937, with the senior school becoming a secondary modern school in 1944. However, its popularity fell after the opening of nearby Churchfields High School in 1955 (this school eventually closed in July 2001) and the senior school closed in 1967.

Bishop Asbury Cottage is located on the A4041 Newton Road on the Grove Vale/Great Barr border. The 18th century cottage, now a Grade II listed museum was the boyhood home of Francis Asbury, the first American Methodist Bishop.

The ward is covered by the Diocese of Lichfield and the areas most historic church, All Saints is located on the A4031 (All Saints Way). There has been a church on this spot dating back to the Norman period. The current church was mostly rebuilt, except the tower, in 1872 where it lost its Patronage which was originally St Clement, and subsequent years when it was enlarged. Buried in the church yard are a number of well known people including James Eaton (1785–1857) who served in the Téméraire at the Battle of Trafalgar and as signal midshipman, repeated Nelson's message to the fleet. And also James Keir, a member of the Lunar Society who lived at Finchpath Hall at Hill Top from 1770 and was buried at All Saints' in 1820.

At about 1830, a pound, stocks, and whipping-post stood at the corner of Hollyhedge Road and Heath Lane opposite All Saints' Church. All three were then moved to a site in front of the Ring of Bells at the junction of All Saints Street and Church Vale. The stocks and whipping-post were apparently taken away when the West Bromwich police force was established in 1840. In 1970, the pound still stood, and the stocks were preserved in the grounds of the Oak House.

Much of the area around Charlemont and Grove Vale was developed for private and council housing from the 1920s until the 1970s. The author and countryside campaigner John Bainbridge spent his childhood at 15 Ray Hall Lane and was educated at Grove Vale School.

Charlemont Farm was one of the largest housing developments in the area at its time. It was built in the 1960s to include houses, bungalows, low-rise flats and high-rise flats, many of which have since been demolished with new developments being built in their place.

On March 3, 2015, former Charlemont with Grove Vale councillor Tony Ward was made an honorary alderman of Sandwell. He served as a Conservative councillor in the ward for 11 years from 2003 to 2014.
