= Rowley =

Rowley may refer to:

== Places ==
=== Canada ===
- Rowley, Alberta, a hamlet
- Rowley Island, Nunavut

=== United Kingdom ===
- Rowley, County Durham, a hamlet - see Rowley railway station (England)
- Rowley, East Riding of Yorkshire, England, a village and civil parish
- Rowley, Shropshire, a location in Shropshire, England

=== United States ===
- Rowley, Iowa, a city
- Rowley, Massachusetts, a town
  - Rowley (CDP), Massachusetts, a census-designated place
- Rowley, Utah
- Rowley industrial area, Tooele County, Utah
- Rowley Creek, Wisconsin

== People ==
- Rowley (surname), a list of people
- Rowley (given name), a list of people with the given name or nickname

== Fictional characters ==
- Rowley Birkin QC, in The Fast Show UK television comedy
- Rowley Jefferson, in the Diary of a Wimpy Kid series

== Other uses ==
- Rowley station (MBTA), a commuter rail station in Rowley, Massachusetts, United States
- Rowley railway station (England), a former railway station in Rowley, Durham, England
- HMS Rowley (K560), a British Second World War frigate
- Rowley baronets, three titles, one in the Baronetage of Great Britain and two in the Baronetage of the United Kingdom

== See also ==
- Rowley Burn (disambiguation)
- Rowley Hill (disambiguation)
- Rowley Hills, West Midlands, England
- Rowley Shoals, three coral reefs off the coast of Western Australia
- Old Rowley, a racehorse of King Charles II
- Rowly
- Rowland (disambiguation)
- Ó Rothláin
