= Portway Hill =

Nature reserve in the West Midlands, England

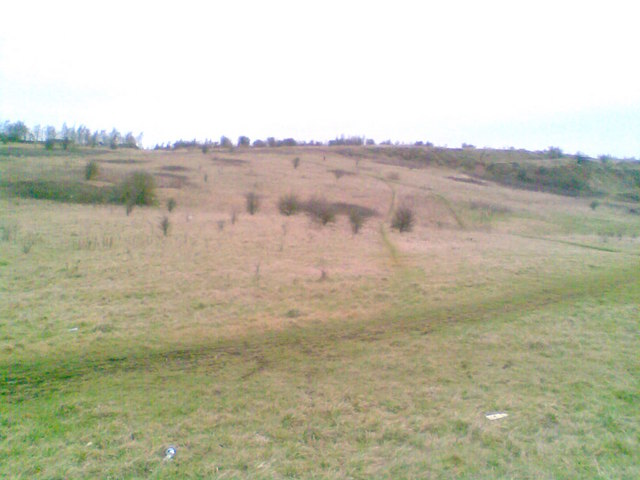

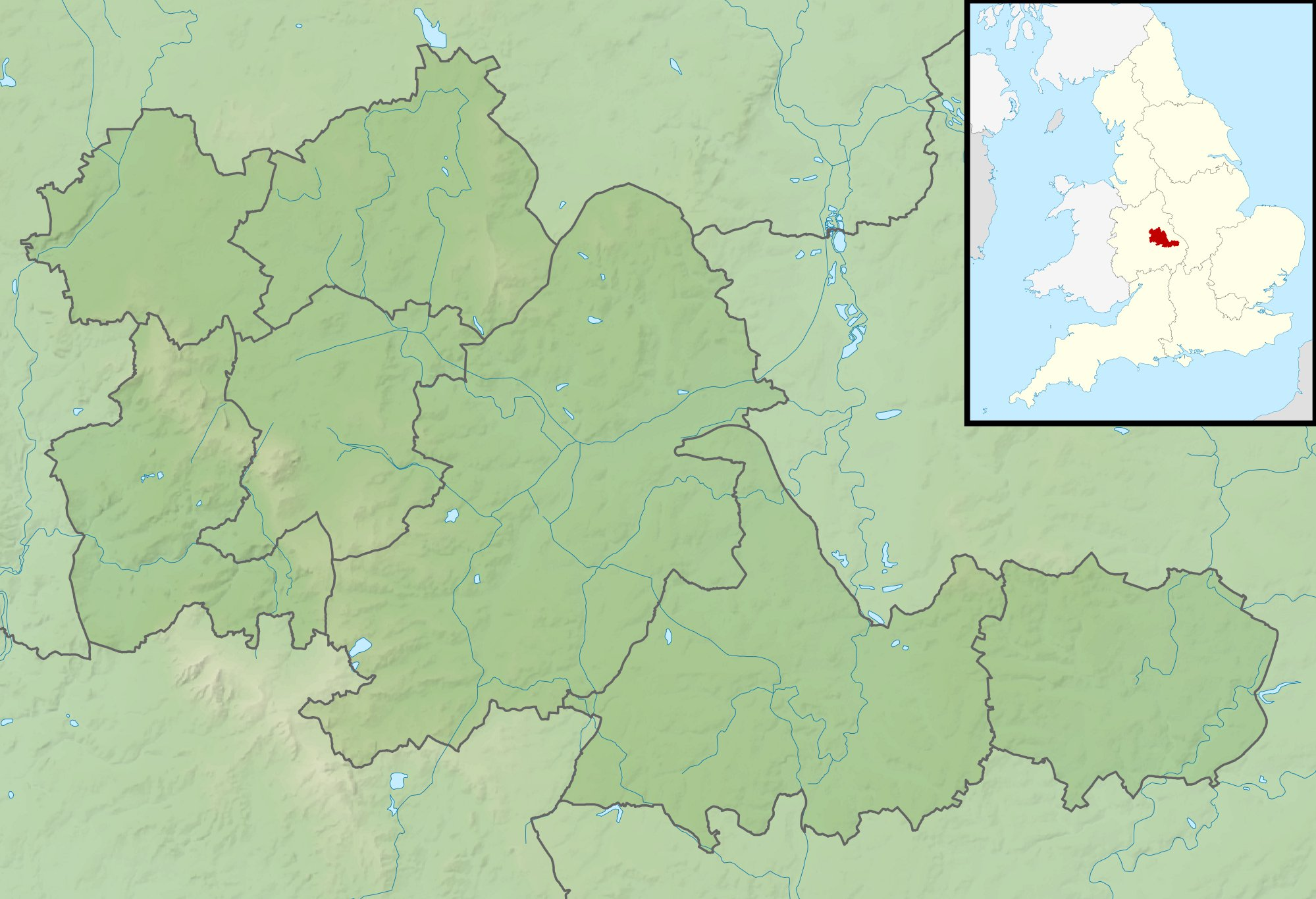
- Location within West Midlands county
- Location: Rowley Regis, West Midlands
- OS grid: SO977890
- Coordinates: 52.499°N 2.034°W
- Created: 2011
- Operator: Wildlife Trust for Birmingham and the Black Country
- Open: All year
- Website: www.bbcwildlife.org.uk/Portway-hill

Portway Hill is part of the Rowley Hills, near Rowley Regis in West Midlands, England. It is the site of a nature reserve of the Wildlife Trust for Birmingham and the Black Country.

== Description ==
The reserve, an area of grassland, was acquired as part of the Wildlife Trust's appeal to protect the Rowley Hills.

Wild flowers in the grassland include rare species such as bee orchid and hare's-foot clover. Butterflies on the reserve include one of the few colonies of marbled white butterfly in the West Midlands.

The grassland habitat attracts particular species of birds, and there are birds of prey such as kestrels and peregrine falcons.

Exposures of Rowley Rag, a hard volcanic rock formerly quarried on Portway Hill, can be seen.
