= Tividale =

District of Sandwell, West Midlands, England

Coordinates: 52.51238°N 2.05300°W

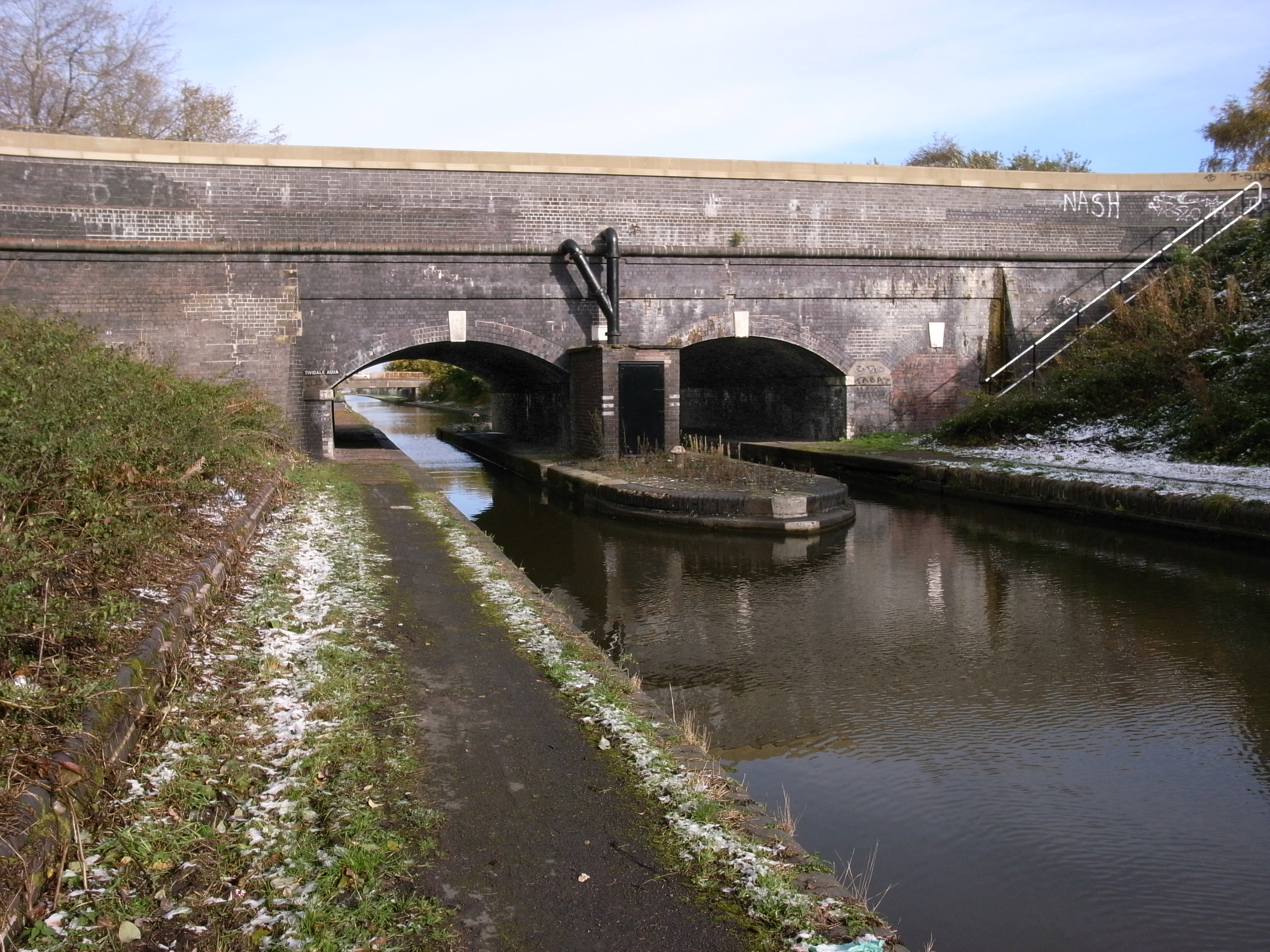
- Tividale Aqueduct

- Location within the West Midlands
- Population: 12,616 (2011.Ward)
- OS grid reference: SO965905
- Metropolitan borough: Sandwell
- Metropolitan county: West Midlands
- Region: West Midlands
- Country: England
- Sovereign state: United Kingdom
- Post town: OLDBURY
- Postcode district: B69
- Post town: TIPTON
- Postcode district: DY4
- Dialling code: 0121; 01384
- Police: West Midlands
- Fire: West Midlands
- Ambulance: West Midlands

Tividale is a district of the Metropolitan Borough of Sandwell, West Midlands.

It straddles the borders of the towns of Dudley, Tipton, Oldbury.

== History ==
Tividale Park has been known as Derygate (Deer Gate) Park; it can be traced back as far as 1327 when Tividale was known as Derickton Cross.

Tividale was largely developed from the mid 19th century around the main road from Oldbury and Dudley, on the border of Dudley and Tipton. Coal mining and stone quarrying increased and canals were built across the area, and Tividale became a centre for industries such as iron and brick manufacture, and several terraced streets were built between Tividale Road and Tipton Road, as well as new houses being built along both of these roads.

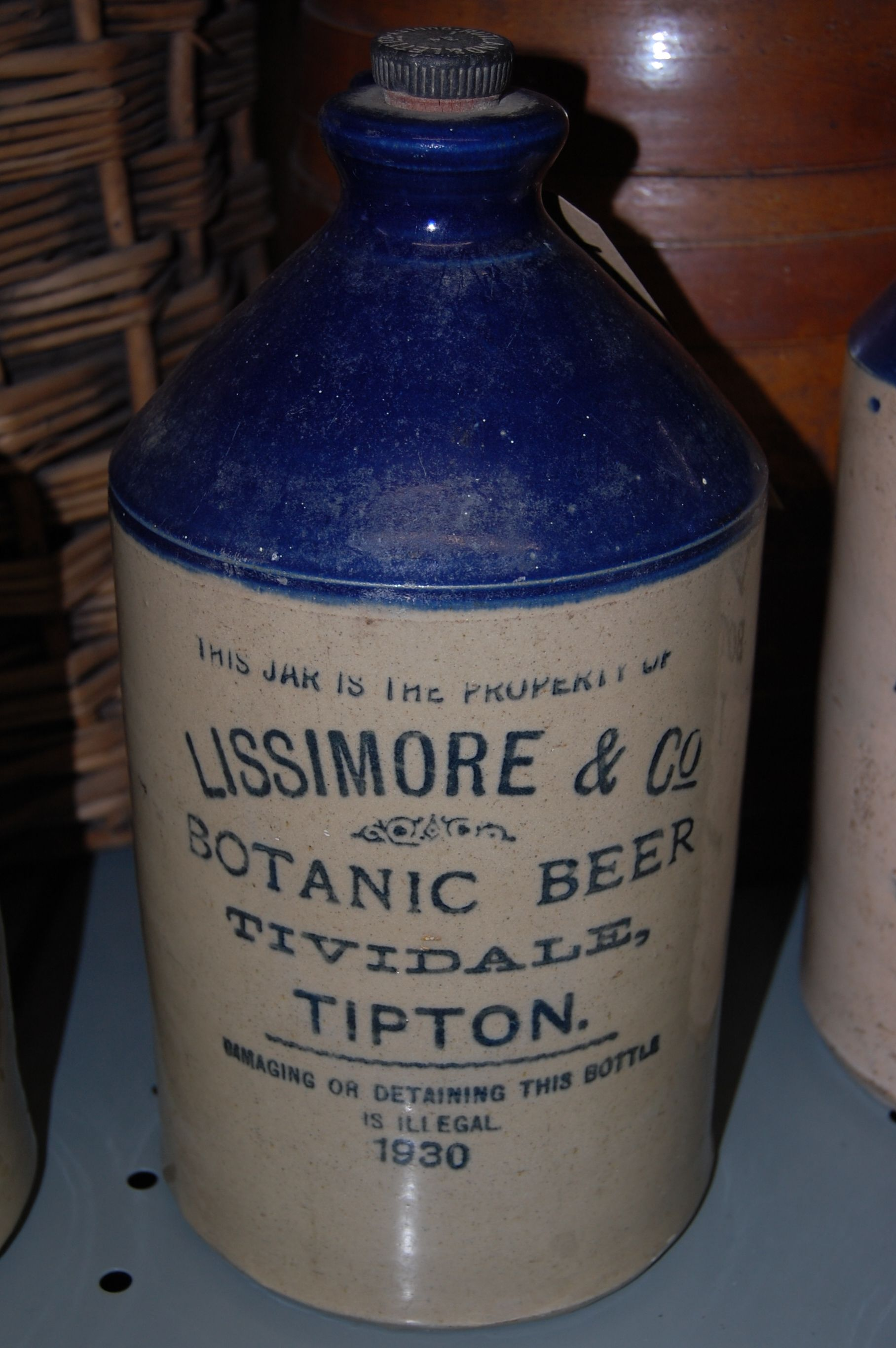
1930 stone bottle labelled "Lissimore & Co – Botanic beer – Tividale, Tipton", in a storeroom of the Black Country Living Museum.

Rattlechain Brickworks were opened in the 1890s on a site near Sedgley Road East, in the shadow of the New Main Line Canal which links Wolverhampton with Birmingham. Quarrying of land next to the brickworks led to a section of the Main Line Canal into the marl hole of the Brickworks in 1899, emptying out six miles of canal and causing thousands of pounds worth of damage, although nobody was injured. Another marl hole was created in 1948 and despite the subsequent closure and demolition of the brickworks, the marl hole remained in use as a disposal site for local factories, and is still known locally as Rattlechain Lagoon. Since the late 1990s, there has been growing local concern over Rattlechain Lagoon, with numerous dead birds being found at the site. Their death was linked to poisoning from chemicals disposed of in the water, which included white phosphorus. Nearby residents, including those of a housing development built in 2006, feared that the proximity of their homes to Rattlechain Lagoon could render them unsellable.

Tividale Tram workshops opened along the main Tividale Road (a tram route) in 1907 and operated until 1930. The tramway closed in 1939, as trams were phased out in favour of motorised buses.

The Birmingham New Road (linking Birmingham with Wolverhampton and also providing a direct road link with Dudley, Tipton, Sedgley, Coseley and Oldbury) opened in November 1927, dividing the Dudley and Tipton sections of Tividale, and was quickly followed by housing developments along the route and in the areas surrounding it.

Tividale began to expand rapidly soon after the completion of the Birmingham New Road, namely with the Grace Mary Estate, which was built by Dudley County Borough Council in the mid 1930s. After the Second World War, further housing developments, mostly by the local authority, saw these two housing estates effectively merged. Private houses began to spring up along the Birmingham New Road during the mid 1930s, and were followed soon afterwards by the Tividale Hall Estate, construction of which was halted around 1940 due to the war effort. Further council housing was built during the 1950s to link the Tividale Hall Estate with Oakham Road.

City Road Infant and Junior Schools (later renamed Oakham Primary School) opened in 1939, followed in 1953 by Tividale Hall Infant and Junior Schools, and around 1960 Grace Mary Primary School. Burnt Tree Primary School relocated to its current site in Hill Road during the 1960s.

There were several air raids on Tividale during the Second World War, including a landmine which on 12 August 1941 destroyed a pair of recently built semi-detached houses on Birch Crescent, killing a six-year-old girl in a house opposite, as well as three people in the two destroyed houses; a 49-year-old woman in a second, and a married couple in a third. Several more people were injured in Birch Crescent. The houses were later rebuilt in the same style, while several surrounding houses suffered damage from the impact of the bombing and were repaired.

On 19 November 1940, a landmine was dropped in City Road, devastating a section of council houses. Four houses were completely reduced to rubble and several others suffered severe damage. A total of 10 people died, including all five members of the Roberts family; 11-year-old Ada her 33-year-old mother Mary 37-year-old father Sidney, eight-year-old brother Geoffrey and nine-year-old brother Sidney junior. Samuel and Beatrice Millington, a married couple in their forties, also died at the scene; their 20-year-old son Samuel junior was pulled alive from the rubble but died in hospital from his injuries the next day. The only surviving member of the family was the youngest son, 17-year-old Sidney. Also killed were a 17-year-old man and five-year-old boy, both from different families. According to one source, the bodies of some of the nine people killed outright were never found and one victim's body was reportedly blown into a nearby tree. Two residents of one badly damaged house escaped injury despite standing on the doorstep of his house when it was half demolished by the landmine. Several other people survived injuries in this attack. The wrecked houses were later rebuilt in the same style.

The Luftwaffe are believed to have targeted these areas of Tividale due to their proximity to the "Big Bertha" anti-aircraft gun which was located near City Road and had been erected at the beginning of the war in 1939 to tackle the impending threat of enemy bombers.

On 21 December 1940, the Boat Inn on Dudley Road East was struck by a stray anti-aircraft shell from "Big Bertha", resulting in the deaths of 12 people who were attending a wedding reception there. A 15-year-old boy, along with his 26-year-old brother a 36-year-old woman, 28-year-old man, a married couple and a 38-year-old man died at the scene. A 16-year-old girl died just after arriving at hospital, as did a 19-year-old man. A 30-year-old woman died in hospital from her injuries the next day, and a 19-year-old woman died in hospital from her injuries two days later, as did a 20-year-old woman. A 20-year-old man in a neighbouring house was also injured as a result of the explosion and died in hospital the next day. The Boat Inn was rebuilt several years afterwards but demolished in 2004.

A total of 27 people died as a result of air raids at Tividale during the Second World War, and dozens more were injured.

The Netherton Tunnel runs under Tividale. Evidence of the tunnel is shown by the 'pepperpots' that can be seen near the site of the former Hangsmans Tree site and in Aston Road, Regent Road and Packwood Road on the Tividale Hall Estate.

Several quarries on the edge of the Tividale area were a source of stone known as the 'Rowley Rag'. Turner's Hill is the site of the only remaining quarry.

In 1966, most of Tividale became part of the Warley, although the section between Tividale Road and Burnt Tree was added to an expanded West Bromwich borough which took in the bulk of Tipton. Since 1974, it has been part of Sandwell Metropolitan Borough in the West Midlands county.

The Oakham Green housing estate was built around Oakham Road and Darby's Hill Road in the late 1960s and early 1970s, with all of these houses being privately owned.

== Quarrying ==
On the southern and eastern slopes of Turner's Hill, which straddles the border of Tividale and Rowley Regis, a huge quarry exposes the brown and grey igneous rock, called dolerite, which covers less than one square mile. It is one of the most distinctive minor regions within the Black Country. The dolerite can be seen as a building stone in the older cottages around Rowley Regis. The dark brown, shapeless rock was used to create walls around the windy fields on the summit of Turners Hill.

The use of the Rowley dolerite (known as Rowley Rag) as a building stone ceased over two centuries ago after bricks (made from the clays within the coal measures) became the universal building material of the Black Country. The rise of the quarry industry on a commercial scale dates from the 1820s; the hard smooth rock was used for the paving stones of new streets in Birmingham and the rapidly growing Black Country towns. Today the quarries serve as a source of road metal. Quarrying in other areas of Tividale, such as Darby's Hill, Warren's Hall and Blue Rock, has ceased; and the quarries are used for landfill. Only Turner's Hill quarry remains.

== Housing ==
Housing estates around Tividale include Tividale Hall, Castle View, Grace Mary and Brades Hall.

Dudley Golf Course has existed at Oakham since the early 20th century, originally being split in two by the Oakham Road. In the mid 1960s, however, the section of the course on Darby's Hill was sold and part of it was used to build a private housing estate known as Oakham Green. The roads on this estate are all named after golf courses; St Andrews Drive, Muirfield Crescent, Gleneagles Drive, Hoylake Drive, Sunningdale Drive, Birkdale Drive and Wentworth Drive.

Grace Mary was built in the 1930s between Oakham and the recently completed Birmingham New Road, mostly as council housing. Expansions took place in the 1950s to merge it into Tividale Hall.

Tividale Hall was developed as private housing during the mid-1930s to early 1940s and the final area around Pine Road immediately after the war in the Dudley section of Tividale, but was extended in the 1950s with council housing. Most of the roads in this area are named after trees, including Elm Terrace, Birch Crescent, Pine Road and Ash Terrace.

Brades Hall (not to be confused with nearby Brades Village in Oldbury) is situated in the north of Tividale off the A457 road between Tipton and Oldbury. The first development took place with private housing during the 1960s, with further private and council housing being added in the 1970s and 1980s. Further sections of private housing were added in 2006 and 2017. Most of the roads are named after former prime ministers and high-profile politicians; including Peel Way, Macdonald Close, Asquith Drive, Palmerston Drive, Gaitskell Terrace, Macmillan Close and Callaghan Drive.

Oakham Green was built around Oakham Road and Darby's Hill Road in the late 1960s on part of Dudley Golf Course.

Castle View is an extension of Tividale Hall and was built during the 1970s, mostly as private housing, but also with several low-rise blocks of council flats. Most of the roads are named after castles; including Stokesay Close, Arundel Close, Clun Close and Pendennis Drive.

In the early 1990s, the area of Tipton around the Birmingham Canal - site of the Long established REVO factory until the late 1970s, was developed as a private housing estate called Tividale Quays.

Although located within the original Dudley and Tipton council areas, most of Tividale is classified within the Oldbury B69 postal district, with the remainder falling into Tipton DY4. All of it is within the borough of Sandwell. The area surrounding Elm Terrace and Trafalgar Road is often known locally as "Lower Oakham."

== Religion ==
St Michael's C of E Church, once the most prominent landmark in the village, was completed in 1878 on Tividale Road. Contributions to its costs were made by local industrialists and especially by the Earl of Dudley. The large, brick building became known as the "Cathedral of the Black Country" and earned a reputation for advanced Anglo-Catholicism early in its history. Several vicars became very well known and loved: one, Wynn Griffiths, is commemorated in a street name in the Tividale Quays development.

The growing parish produced two mission churches: one, St Augustine's (a corrugated iron construction now demolished) on Oldbury Road and a second, Holy Cross, on the Grace Mary Estate to the west of the Birmingham New Road. The Parish Church was earmarked for demolition in 1982 after an inspection revealed that the buildings were riddled with damp and woodworm which would have been very expensive to remedy. It was decided to demolish the church and rebuild it, rather than improve the original building. Consequently, the church was demolished in 1984 and a new, smaller church was later opened in 1991, using what had been the substantial parish hall as its core. There is another church, Oakham Evangelical, sitting on the brow of the hill in City Road.

Tividale is home to a Sikh Temple (Gurdwara) called Gurdwara Guru Hargobind Sahib Ji. Guru Hargobind Sahib Ji was the Sixth 'Teacher' (or in Punjabi Guru) of the Sikh Religion. The Gurdwara is the place of worship for Sikhs, the followers of Sikhism. A Gurdwara can be identified from a distance by a tall flagpole bearing the Nishan Sahib, the Sikh flag. There are estimated to be around 300 Sikhs currently living around Tividale.

Today, Tividale is also the home of the new Hindu Temple which is an exact replica of Tirupati Balaji Temple in Southern India.

== Education ==
The area has been served by a secondary school since 1956, when Tividale Comprehensive School opened in Lower City Road to serve the 11–18 age range, at the time being one of the first comprehensive schools in Britain. It was renamed Tividale High School in September 1997, and Tividale Community Arts College in 2005 before becoming Ormiston Sandwell Community Academy in September 2009. Tividale Hall Primary School opened in Regent Road in 1953.

The closest higher education institution is the University of Wolverhampton.

== Manufacturing ==
Vono beds set up business at Tividale in 1896 and remained present in the area for some 100 years afterwards, until relocating from their Groveland Road factory to a new site in Wednesbury during the 1990s.

== Public houses ==
The majority of Tividale's pubs today are situated on Tividale Road and Dudley Road West near Tividale's northern border. The Wonder, The Albion, The Plough and The George are all within walking distance of each other. The Wheatsheaf stands alone at the southern edge of the area on the junction of Turner's Hill, Portway Hill, City Road and Oakham Road.

Since around the year 2000, numerous pubs, especially the housing estate-based establishments, have gone. The Hangman's Tree (demolished 2007), Barley Mow (demolished 2010), Red Lion (demolished 2010), The Huntsman (converted into an Indian restaurant, the 'Red Mango'), The Waggon & Horses (now a branch of the Co-Operative food store) and the Cottage Spring no longer exist as pubs, if at all.

The Hangman's Tree Public House was named after an elm tree that grew opposite the public house; it was said to have been used for at least one public execution in the 18th or 19th century. The elm tree contracted Dutch elm disease in the early 1970s and was later struck by lightning; Warley council had to take down the tree and all trace has now been removed.

== Governance ==
Tividale was historically divided between the boroughs of Dudley and Tipton, which meant that it was also divided between the counties of Worcestershire and Staffordshire. In 1966 most of it became part of the County Borough of Warley, and in 1974 it became part of Sandwell borough. The current Tividale ward covers the housing estates south of the A4123, while most of the former Tipton section of Tividale is in the Oldbury ward. Elm terrace and Trafalgar road are sometimes referred to as lower Oakham

== Politics ==
Since 1997 Tividale has been in the parliamentary constituency of West Bromwich West, prior to this it was in Warley West which was abolished for that election. A notable MP for the latter constituency was the former Solicitor General Peter Archer. The first MP for Tividale in its present seat was the then-Speaker of the House Betty Boothroyd. Its present member, since December 2019 is Shaun Bailey. of the Conservative Party.

== Sport ==
Tividale Football Club play in the West Midlands (Regional) League Premier Division. Their ground, The Beeches, is located on Packwood Road and was built during the 1970s.
