= Turners Hill Transmitter =

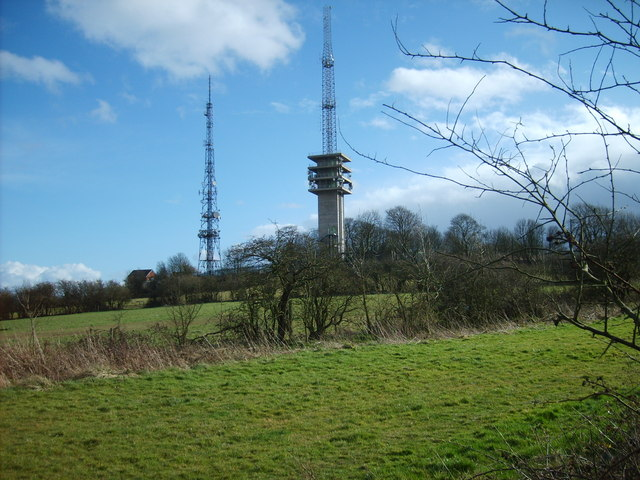
- The towers in March 2007
- Location: Turners Hill, Sandwell, West Midlands, England
- Coordinates: 52.49642°N 2.04870°W

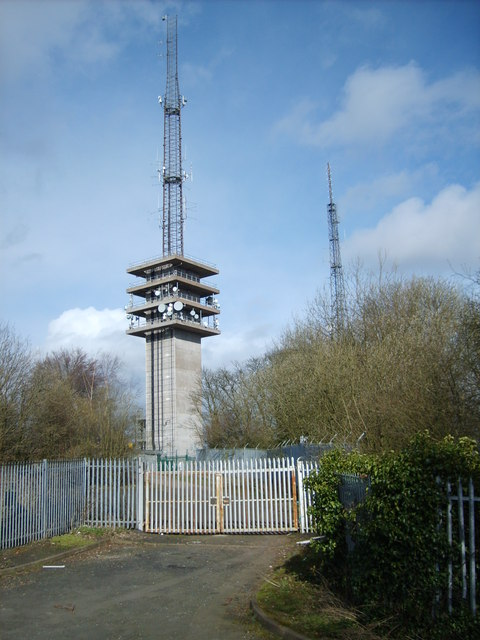
Turners Hill 2 in March 2007

Turners Hill Transmitter refers to a pair of free-standing radio and television towers on Turners Hill, on the border of Dudley and Rowley Regis in the Metropolitan Borough of Sandwell; both towns being in the West Midlands County of England.

One is made from lattice steel; and the other, "Turners Hill 2," with a height of 60.96 metres (200 ft), is made of concrete, topped by a steel antenna.

They carry multiplexes 11A, 11B, 11C, 11D and 12B.

It also broadcasts Hits Radio Black Country & Shropshire on 97.2 FM.

A local landmark, the masts are visible from the nearby M5 motorway and M6 motorway, and from as far afield as Barr Beacon.
