= Rowley Hill =

Rowley Hill may refer to:

== People ==
- Rowley Hill (bishop) (1836–1887), Anglican Bishop of Sodor and Man
- Rowley Hill (soldier) (c. 1837–1930), New Zealand Cross recipient

== Places ==
- Rowley Hills, group of hills located in the West Midlands, England
- Rowley's Hill, located near the villages of Harston and Newton in Cambridgeshire, England
