= Rowley Regis =

Town in the West Midlands County, England

Coordinates: 52.488°N 2.05°W

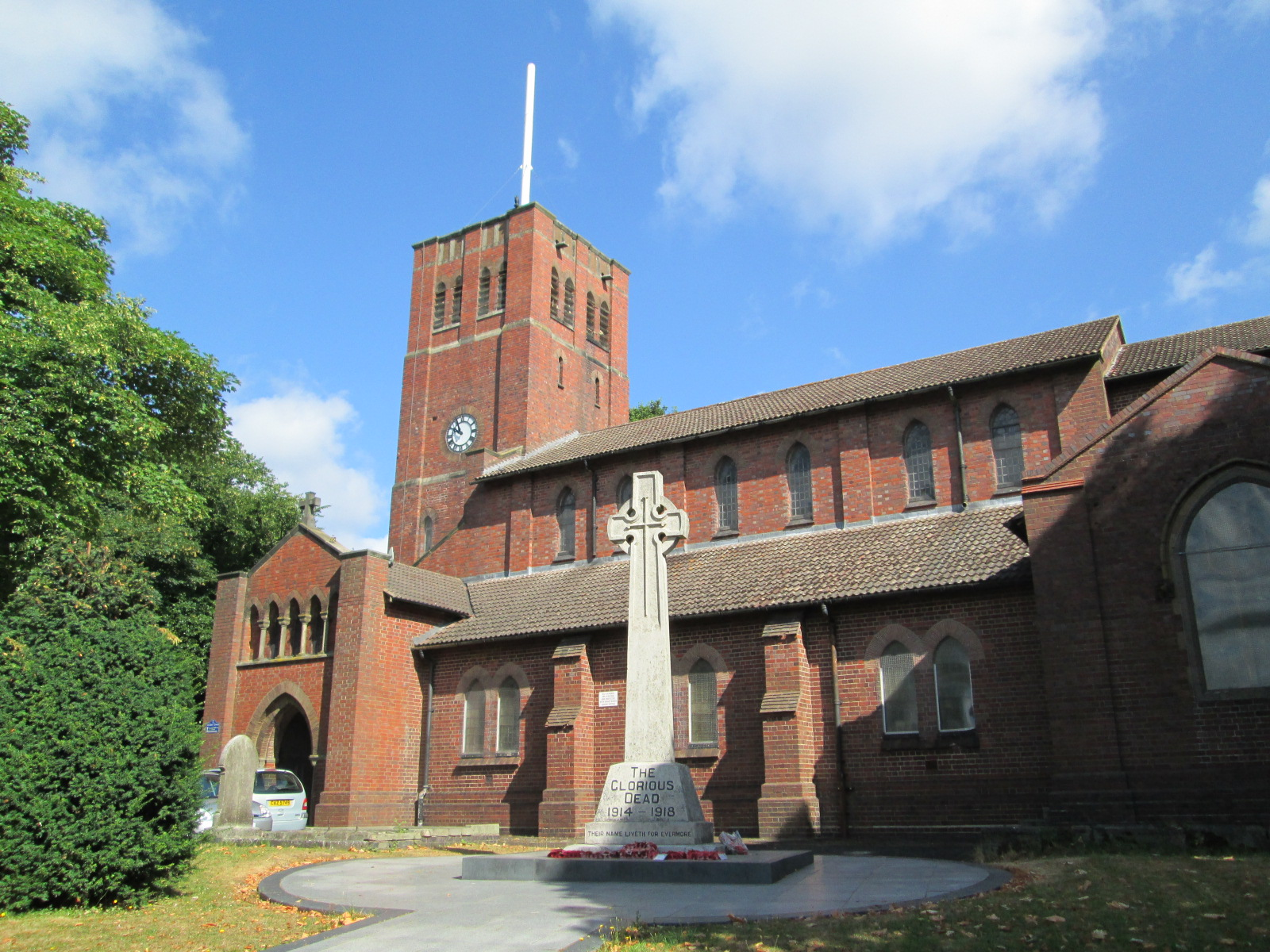
- St Giles' Church, parish church of Rowley Regis

- Location within the West Midlands
- Population: 50,257 (2011) (Note: Combined figure for Blackheath, Cradley Heath & Old Hill, and Rowley wards.)
- OS grid reference: SO9687
- Metropolitan borough: Sandwell
- Metropolitan county: West Midlands
- Region: West Midlands
- Country: England
- Sovereign state: United Kingdom
- Post town: CRADLEY HEATH
- Postcode district: B64
- Post town: ROWLEY REGIS
- Postcode district: B65
- Dialling code: 0121; 01384
- Police: West Midlands
- Fire: West Midlands
- Ambulance: West Midlands
- UK Parliament: Smethwick, West Bromwich

Rowley Regis (/ˈraʊli ˈriːdʒɪs/ ROW-lee REE-jis) is a town in the metropolitan borough of Sandwell in the West Midlands County, England. Historically in Staffordshire, it forms part of the Black Country and encompasses the four Sandwell council wards of both towns of Blackheath and Cradley Heath, as well as the areas of Old Hill, Rowley and Tividale. At the 2011 census, the combined population of these wards was 50,257.

== History ==
The name Rowley derives from the Old English rūhlēah meaning 'rough wood or clearing'.

Evidence of early human activity in the area includes the name Pencricket Lane, which is thought to derive from a boundary between ancient woodland camps, potentially belonging to the Cornovii tribe. Roman presence in Rowley Regis is evidenced by the discovery of an earthenware vessel containing Roman silver coins.

During the reign of King Cnut (990–1035), Rowley was described by a monastic abbot as being "wasted by war", with much of the land covered in thicket, scrub, and wild heath. In the late 11th century, the Mercian Godwin family rose to power, and Rowley likely became part of the Royal demesne under Harold Godwinson. This status as a royal estate explains its absence from the Domesday Book of 1086, as it was already held by the Crown and did not need to be recorded for the purpose of land redistribution or rental rolls.

Clent Vicarage Act 1841
- Act of Parliament
- Parliament of the United Kingdom
- Long title: An Act for severing the Chapelry of Rowley Regis from the Vicarage of Clent in the County of Stafford; and for the Sale of certain Lands situate in the Parish of Rowley Regis, and belonging to the Vicarage of Clent with the Chapelry of Rowley Regis annexed, and thereby providing a Residence and Maintenance for the Curate or Officiating Minister of Rowley Regis; and for other Purposes.
- Citation: 4 & 5 Vict. c. 24 Pr.

Dates
- Royal assent: 21 June 1841

Text of statute as originally enacted

The history of Rowley Regis can be traced back to the 12th century, when a small village grew around the parish church of St Giles, 2 miles (3 kilometres) southeast of Dudley. A religious site likely existed in Rowley from Saxon times, but the first stone church was constructed between 1199 and 1216 during the reign of King John. This original structure was built of mortarless Rowley Rag (dolerite) and dedicated to St Giles, the patron saint of woodlands. In 1284, the church served as a chapel of ease to the church in Clent, some eight miles away. This administrative link continued until 1841, when the Rev. George Barrs secured a private act of Parliament, the Clent Vicarage Act 1841 (4 & 5 Vict. c. 24 Pr.) to sever Rowley from the agricultural parish of Clent, reflecting Rowley's growth into a significant industrial population. The current church, completed in 1923, is notably dedicated to two saints: St Giles and St Michael.

Rowley was part of the royal hunting grounds – Regis was added to the name of Rowley in around 1140 to signify it was that part of Rowley belonging to the King.

Along with the rest of the Black Country, Rowley Regis began to see substantial development in the early to mid-19th century. Coal was mined at the Earl of Dudley's Ramrod Colliery from 1855, at Rowley Hall Colliery from 1865 and at Bell End Colliery off Mincing Lane. The three collieries were connected by mineral tramway to the Causeway Green branch canal at Titford. All had ceased operation by 1920. In addition to coal mining, the area was a center for the production of wrought iron nails and chains. These trades were typically conducted in small domestic workshops located behind houses, involving entire families. The legacy of these industries is reflected in the Rowley Regis Borough Coat of Arms, which features symbols of the local trades. While quarrying of Rowley Rag for road stone and building materials had occurred since Roman times, industrial-scale production lasted for approximately 200 years until the final quarry closed in 2008.

In 1933, Rowley Regis became a borough, and incorporated the communities of Blackheath, Old Hill, and Cradley Heath. These places were all within the ancient parish of Rowley Regis, which (despite being in the county of Staffordshire) was in the diocese of Worcester. The parish contained the manors of Rowley Regis and Rowley Somery, the latter being part of the barony of Dudley, but the extents of these manors and the relationship between them are not clear. Around the time that Rowley Regis became a borough, housebuilding accelerated in both the public and private sectors.

The present St Giles Church on Church Road is not the original church in Rowley Regis. The church built in 1840 to succeed the original mediaeval building, was found to be unsafe and condemned in 1900. The next church, built in 1904, was burned down in 1913, some believing the fire to have been started by Suffragettes or local striking steelworkers; this however is supposition and it was more than probable it was a simple accident, the church at this time using paraffin as a means of lighting and the latter perhaps causing the fire. Its present-day successor was designed by Holland W. Hobbiss and A. S. Dixon, and was built in 1923.

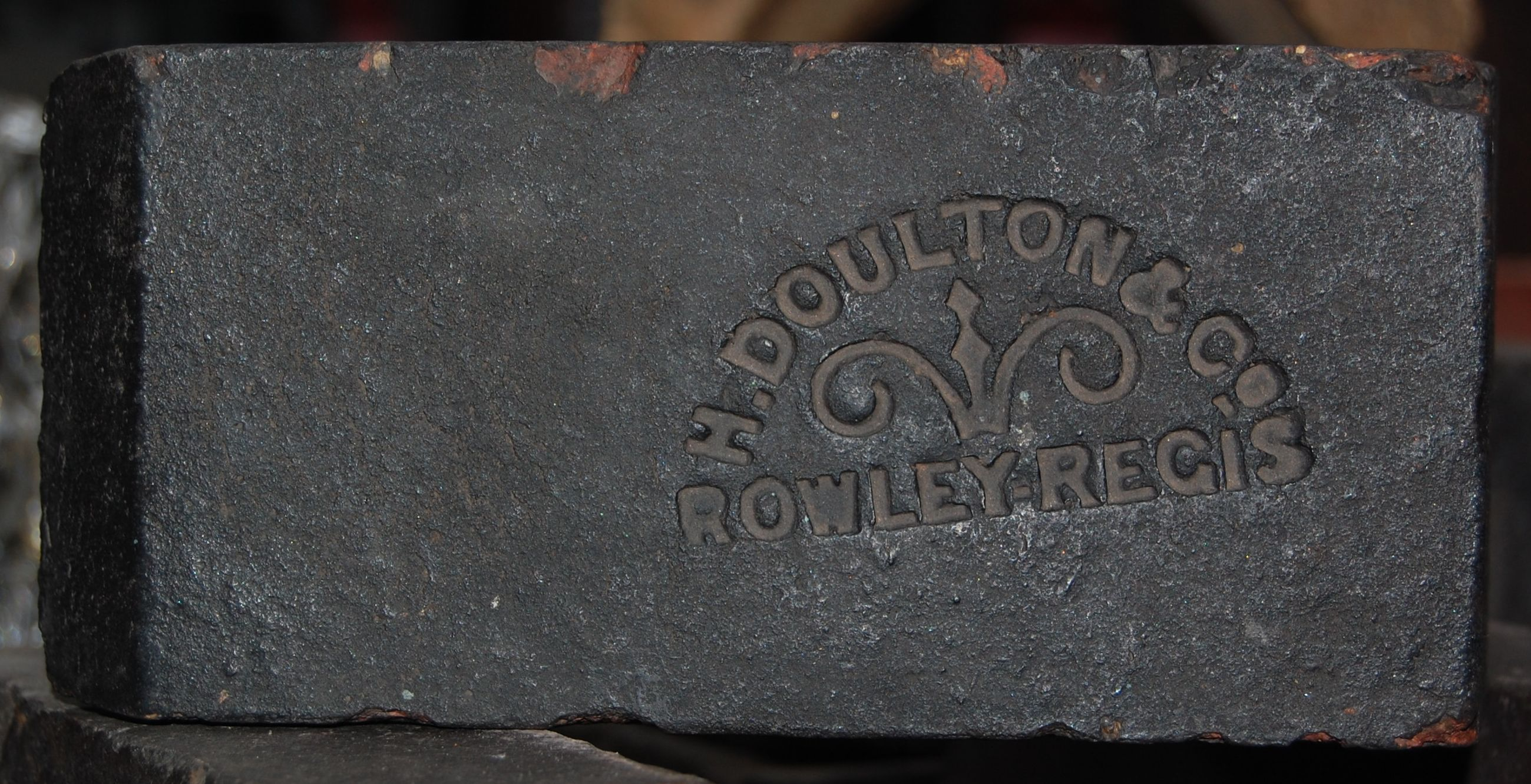
Brick made by H Doulton & Co. of Rowley Regis, displayed in the Black Country Living Museum

Rowley Regis railway station opened in 1867 in the south of the then village, and remains in use to this day.

The new Rowley Regis grammar school was opened on Hawes Lane in September 1962. Well-known former pupils include Pete Williams (original bass player with Dexys Midnight Runners), and actress Josie Lawrence. From September 1975, when comprehensive schools became universal in the new borough of Sandwell, the grammar school became Rowley Regis Sixth Form College, the last intake of grammar school pupils having been inducted the previous year. The younger pupils were distributed between local comprehensive schools. In September 2003, it became an annexe of Dudley College, but this arrangement lasted just one year before the buildings fell into disuse. Demolished three years later, the site was redeveloped as the new Rowley Learning Campus under Sandwell's Building Schools for the Future programme, comprising St Michael's Church of England High School, Westminster Special School, and Whiteheath Education Centre, which opened in 2011.

Rowley Regis Borough of Rowley Regis
- Municipal borough
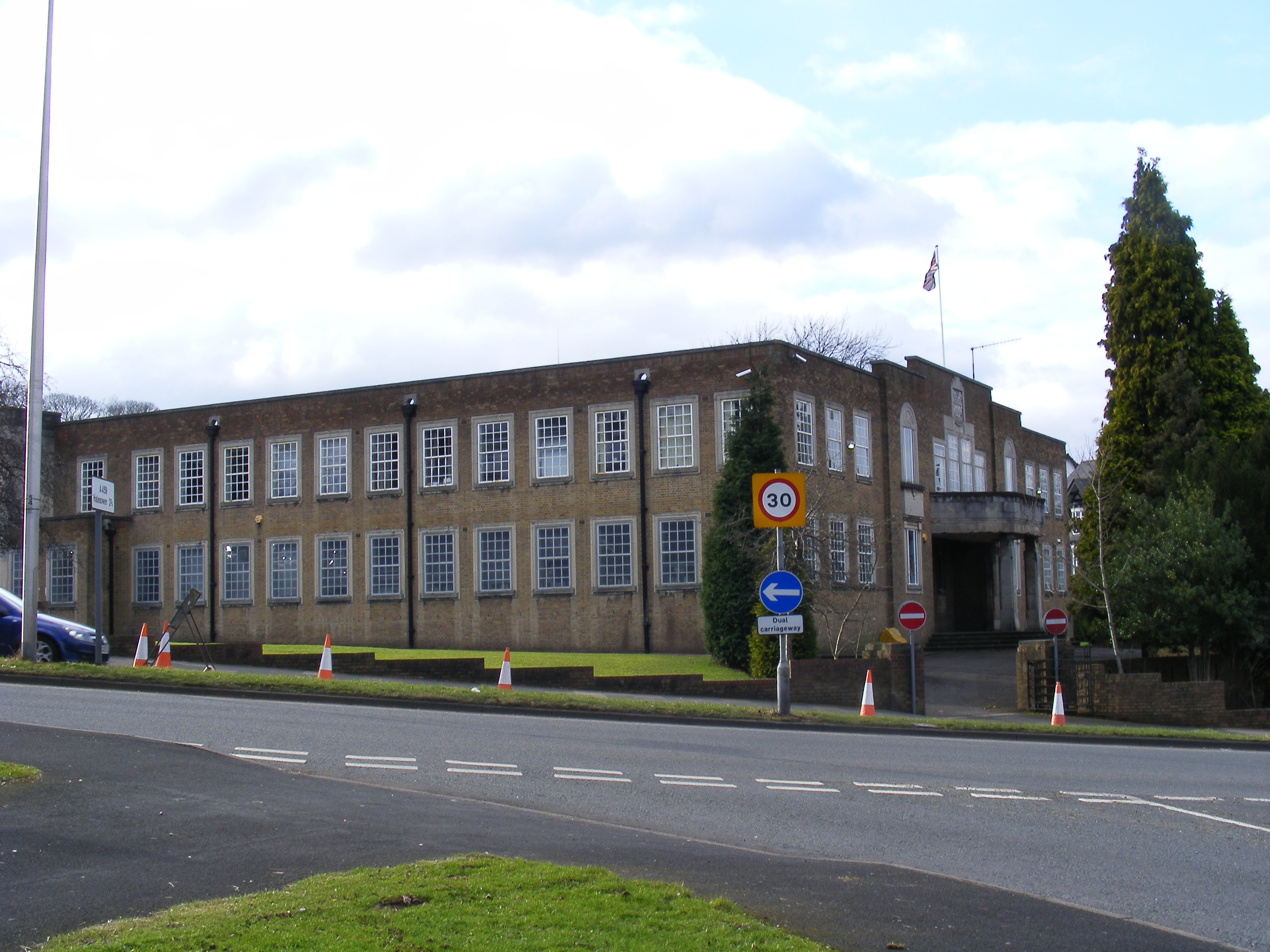
- Former Rowley Regis Council House (1937–2012)
- Population
  - 1911: 37,000
  - 1961: 48,146
- History
  - Preceded by: Sanitary district
  - Created: 1894
  - Abolished: 1966
  - Succeeded by: County Borough of Warley
- Status: Urban district (1894–1933); Municipal borough (1933–1966)
- Government: Rowley Regis Borough Council
  - HQ: Council House, Old Hill
  - Motto: "Loyal and Industrious"
- Arms of Rowley Regis Borough Council

=== Civic history ===
At the time of the Domesday Book in 1086, the parish of Rowley Regis was in the county of Worcestershire. It would soon be transferred to Staffordshire, during a period of many land transfers in Worcestershire between Staffordshire and Shropshire, where it would remain until 1966. As a result of Rowley's transfer to Staffordshire, Dudley was left a detached part of Worcestershire.

The Rowley Regis Urban District was formed in 1894 to cover the villages of Rowley, Blackheath, Cradley Heath, and Old Hill. The urban district was incorporated into a municipal borough in 1933. Following the acquisition of borough status, plans were unveiled to build new council offices in the borough to replace the existing offices in Lawrence Lane, Old Hill. A site on the corner of Halesowen Road and Barrs Road was selected. Work commenced in October 1937, and the building was opened by the Mayor of Rowley Regis in December 1938. Birmingham's Evening Despatch newspaper described the building as "spacious, imposing and distinctly modern".

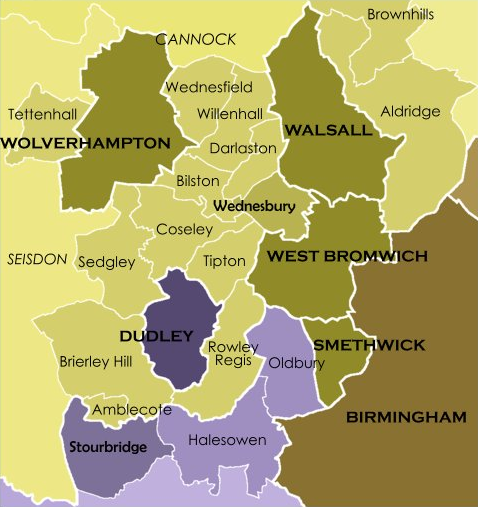
The local government structure within North Worcestershire and South Staffordshire – Prior to the West Midlands Order 1965 reorganisation

On 1 April 1966, the borough of Rowley Regis merged with the boroughs of Oldbury and Smethwick to form the Warley County Borough, part also went to the County Borough of West Bromwich, the County Borough of Dudley and the Municipal Borough of Halesowen, Rowley Regis became part of Worcestershire. The merger was unpopular with many residents and derided by some as 'Warley white elephant'. The parish was also abolished on 1 April 1966 to form Warley, part also went to West Bromwich, Dudley and Halesowen. In 1961 the parish had a population of 48,146.

In 1974, Warley merged with West Bromwich to form Sandwell Metropolitan Borough in the new county of West Midlands.

Following the demise of Rowley Regis as a standalone borough in 1966, the council offices in Barrs Road were retained by Warley council and then by Sandwell council. However, a plan was submitted in July 2012 by Sandwell Leisure Trust to demolish the buildings to make way for an expansion to the neighbouring Haden Hill Leisure Centre, and the development of a new fire station.

The archives for Rowley Regis Borough are held at Sandwell Community History and Archives Service.

== Geography ==
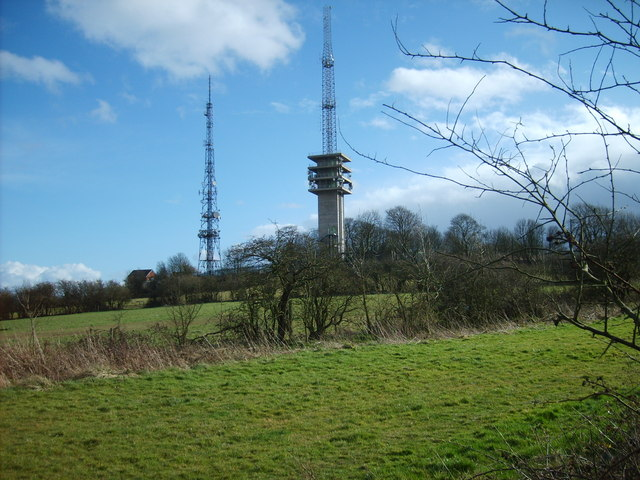
Turner's Hill, the highest point in the West Midlands

Rowley Regis is the location of the Rowley Hills, famed for the quarrying of Rowley Rag Stone. The hills form part of the east/west watershed between the rivers Trent and Severn, and contain the highest point in the West Midlands region, Turner's Hill, at 269m above sea level.

A feature in The Birmingham Post of 10 November, 1952 describes Rowley Regis as a "Town in Tiers"; the explanation being that Cradley Heath and Old Hill lie in a valley, Blackheath is "the next step up" followed by a further climb up to Rowley parish church and up and over the Rowley Hills to Tividale.

=== Localities (former borough of Rowley Regis) ===
- Blackheath
- Cradley Heath
- Haden Hill
- Old Hill
- Rowley Village
- Whiteheath

Additionally the historic township of Rowley, situated atop the hills, historically included several small hamlets, many of which are now considered "lost" or absorbed into the modern urban spread. These include:

- Perry's Lake
- Gadds Green
- Tipperty Green
- Turners Hill

== Notable residents ==
- John Haden Badley (1865–1967), centenarian and founder of Bedales School grew up spending time at his family's country home "Foxcote" and visiting his uncle and cousins at Haden Hill
- Josie Lawrence (born 1959), actress, was educated at Rowley Regis Grammar School (1970–75)
- Scott Liam Malone (born 1991), professional footballer
- Carlton Palmer (born 1965), former footballer who played for the England team as well as clubs including West Bromwich Albion, Sheffield Wednesday and Leeds United
- George Smith (1805–1874), executioner, period in office 1849–1872
- James Woodhouse (1735–1820), poet, born in Rowley Regis, known as the "cobbler poet"

== See also ==
- Regis (place)
- List of place names with royal patronage in the United Kingdom
