= Tividale Quays =

English residential area

Coordinates: 52.517°N 2.054°W

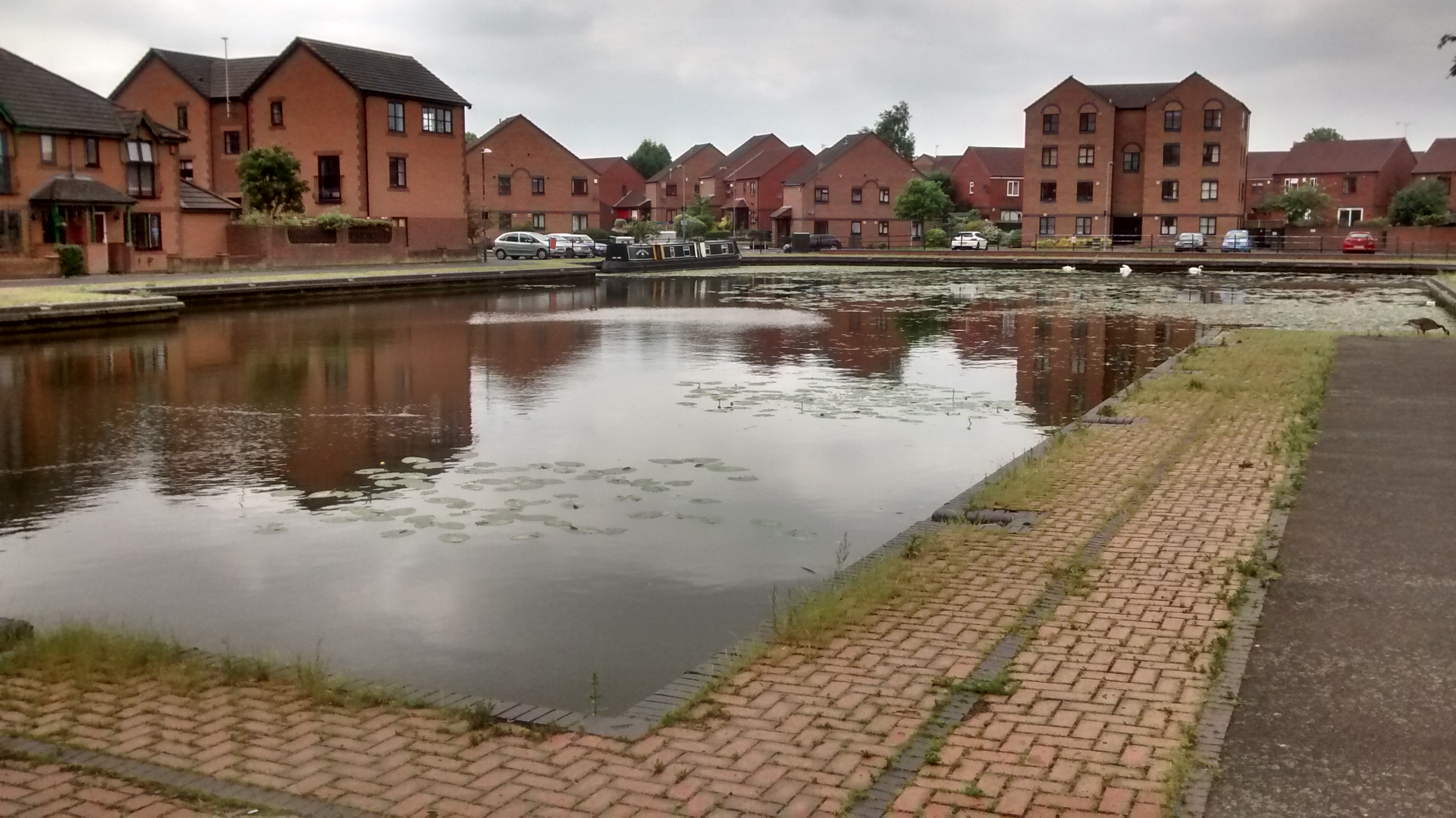
Tividale Quays Basin, Dudley Port, Tipton

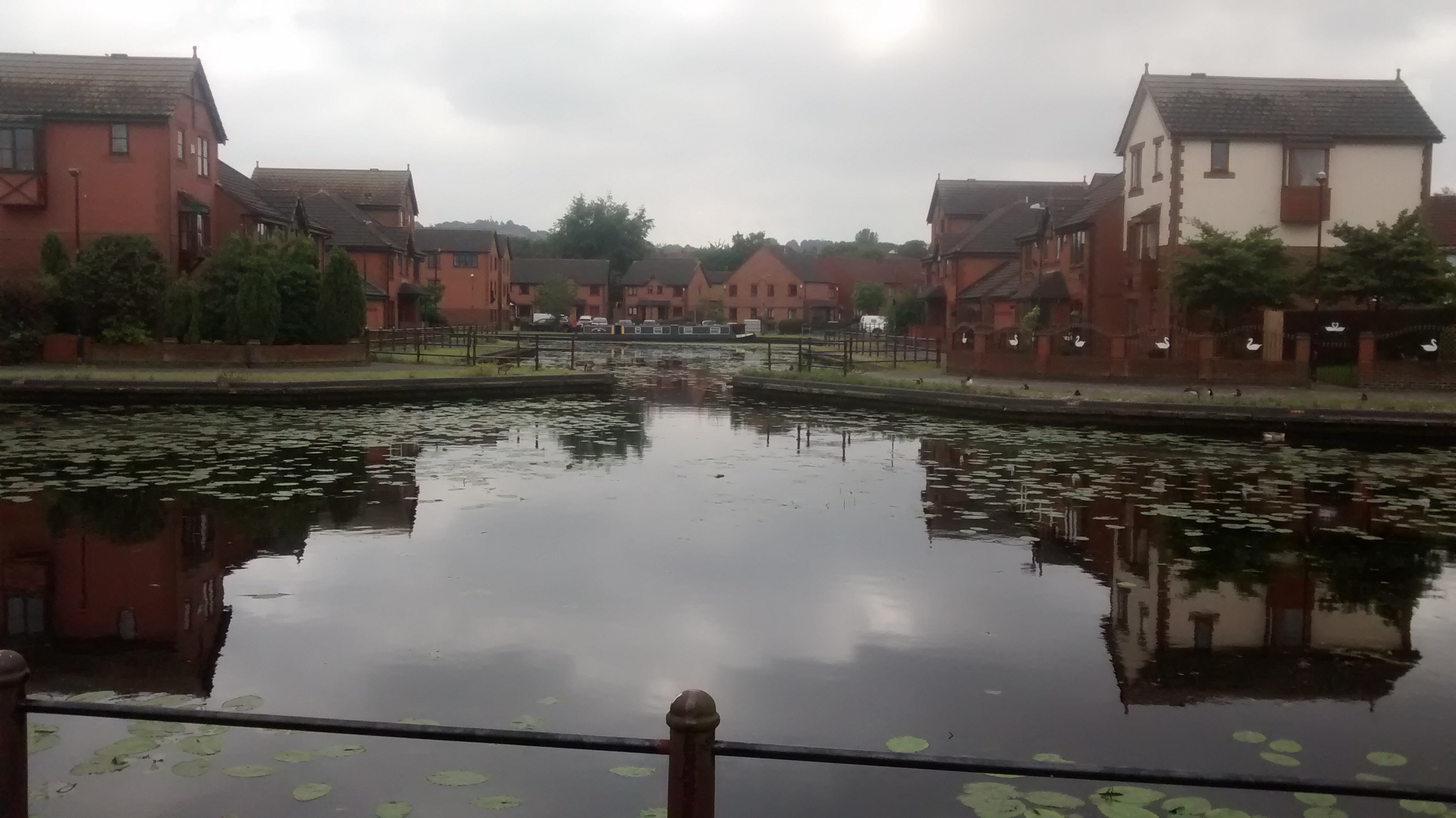
Entrance to Tividale Quays Basin, Dudley Port from the Birmingham Old Main Line

Tividale Quays is a residential area of Tipton in the West Midlands, England, centred on Monins Avenue.

It was developed in the early 1990s on derelict and former industrial land in the Tividale area of the town. The area consists of one- and two-bedroom flats, one- and two-bedroom starter homes, three-bedroom semi-detached and detached houses as well as four-bedroom three-storey houses.

Part of the estate surrounds a canal basin—which is part of Dudley Port on located on Birmingham Old Main Line canal— was exploited to develop a "quayside" atmosphere. The development of Tividale Quays was one of the first of many housing developments to help improve Tipton's reputation.

The basin, and the canal side quays either side of the entrance to the basin, have mooring rings that are used by visiting narrowboats. The basin is regularly used by fishing clubs in the West Midlands and the surrounding area, with tournaments and competitions taking place on a regular basis. Surrounding streets include Monins Avenue, St Michaels Way and Wyn-Griffith Drive.
