= Turners Hill, West Midlands =

Hill in the West Midlands, England

Turners Hill
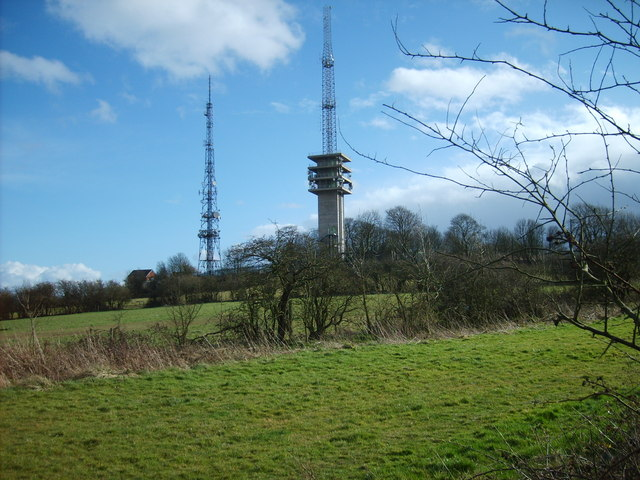
- Two radio transmission towers at the summit

Highest point
- Elevation: 271 m (889 ft)
- Listing: County top
- Coordinates: 52°29′46″N 2°02′50″W

Geography
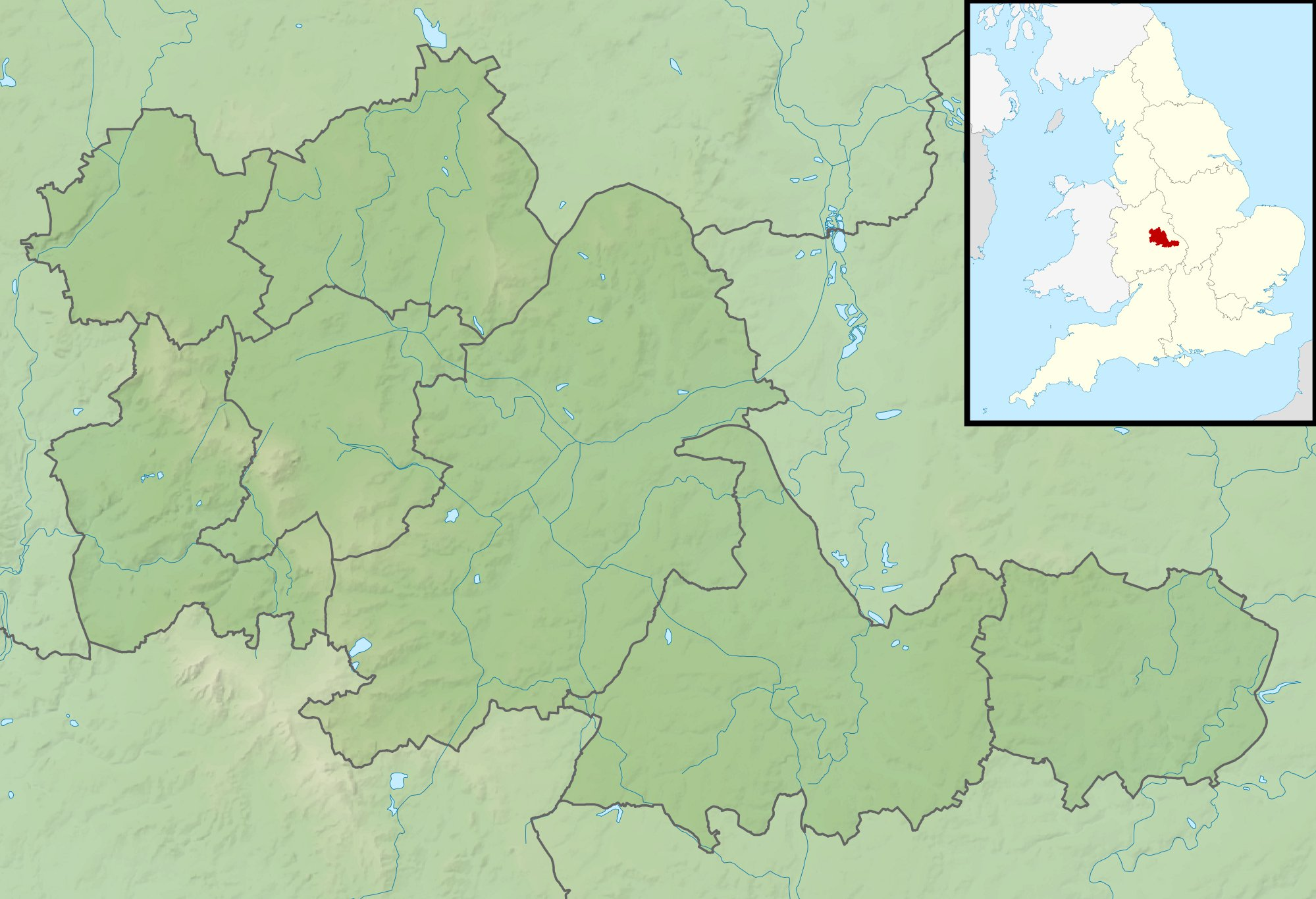
- Location within West Midlands county
- Location: Rowley Regis, West Midlands, England
- Parent range: Rowley Hills
- OS grid: SO969887
- Topo map: OS Explorer 219

Geology
- Rock age: Silurian (Wenlock)
- Mountain type: Sedimentary

Turners Hill is the highest hill in the county of West Midlands, England at 271 metres (889 ft) above sea level. The hill is in the Rowley Hills range, situated in Rowley Regis, near the boundary with Dudley.

The hill can be seen from many miles away, and offers good views to Clent Hills, Kinver Edge, Shatterford Hill, Barr Beacon and on a clear day to the Shropshire and Malvern Hills. There are good views of the hill from the M5 Motorway between Junctions 1 and 2.

== Features ==
There are working quarries on the southern end of the hill that are used to obtain diabase.

On top of the hill are two large radio transmission towers which can be seen for many miles.

Dudley Golf Club is also situated on the hill.
