= Rowley Hills =

Hill range in the West Midlands, England

- Rowley Rag
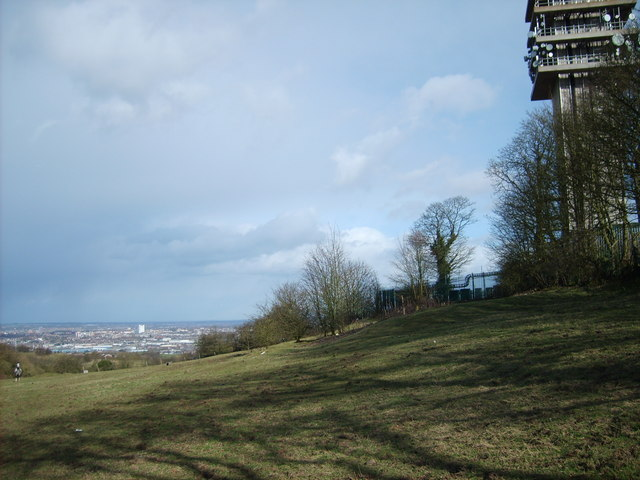
- View from transmission tower on Turner's Hill

- Location within West Midlands county
- Coordinates: 52°29′47″N 2°3′0″W
- Grid position: SO 966 887
- Location: Rowley Regis, West Midlands
- Age: Carboniferous
- Highest elevation: 269 metres (883 ft) (Turner's Hill)

The Rowley Hills are a range of hills in the West Midlands county in England. The range comprises Turner's Hill, Bury Hill, Portway Hill and Darby's Hill. The ridge forms part of the east/west watershed between the River Severn and the River Trent, with rainfall on the western side going to the Bristol Channel via the Severn, and rainfall on the eastern side ending up in the North Sea via the Trent. The hills are situated east of the town of Dudley, within the town of Rowley Regis, on the border between the metropolitan boroughs of Dudley and Sandwell.

The largest hill, Turner's Hill, is the highest point in the West Midlands county, with an altitude of 269 metres (883 ft) above sea level. Views from the summit include the Clee Hills, Clent Hills, Cannock Chase, and much of Birmingham and the Black Country. The height has also led to the construction of two radio transmission towers on the summit.

Portway Hill is the site of a nature reserve of the Wildlife Trust for Birmingham and the Black Country.

Rowley Rag, a form of dolerite notably used to make kerbstones, was formerly quarried from the Rowley Hills.

Over the centuries that the hills have been inhabited there have been four churches located there, all named St. Giles, in the village of Rowley.

== See also ==
- Turners Hill Transmitter
