= Rowley Creek =

Stream in Sauk and Columbia County, Wisconsin, U.S.

Coordinates: 43°28′38″N 89°38′22″W

Rowley Creek is a stream in Sauk and Columbia counties, in the U.S. state of Wisconsin. It is a tributary to the Baraboo River.

Rowley Creek was named for an early settler.

== See also ==
- List of rivers of Wisconsin
