= Rowley (given name) =

Rowley is a masculine given name and nickname which may refer to:

- Rowland Bourke (1885–1958), Canadian recipient of the Victoria Cross
- Rowley Douglas (born 1977), 2000 Olympic champion rowing coxswain for the UK
- Rowley Elliott (1877–1944), Unionist politician in Northern Ireland
- Roland Rowley Fischer (1910–1992), Australian rules footballer
- Rowland Rowley Griffiths (1895–1977), Australian rules footballer
- Rowley Lambert (1828–1880), British Royal Navy vice-admiral
- Rowley Lascelles (1771–1841), English antiquarian and archivist
- Rowley Leigh (born 1950), British chef, restaurateur and journalist
- Rowley Murphy (1891–1975), Canadian marine painter, illustrator and designer of stained glass
- Roland Rowley Young (1883–1961), Canadian professional ice hockey player
