= Rowley Burn =

Rowley Burn can refer to:

- Rowley Burn (Northumberland), tributary of Devil's Water
- Rowley Burn (County Durham), tributary of the River Deerness
