= Diabase =

Type of igneous rock

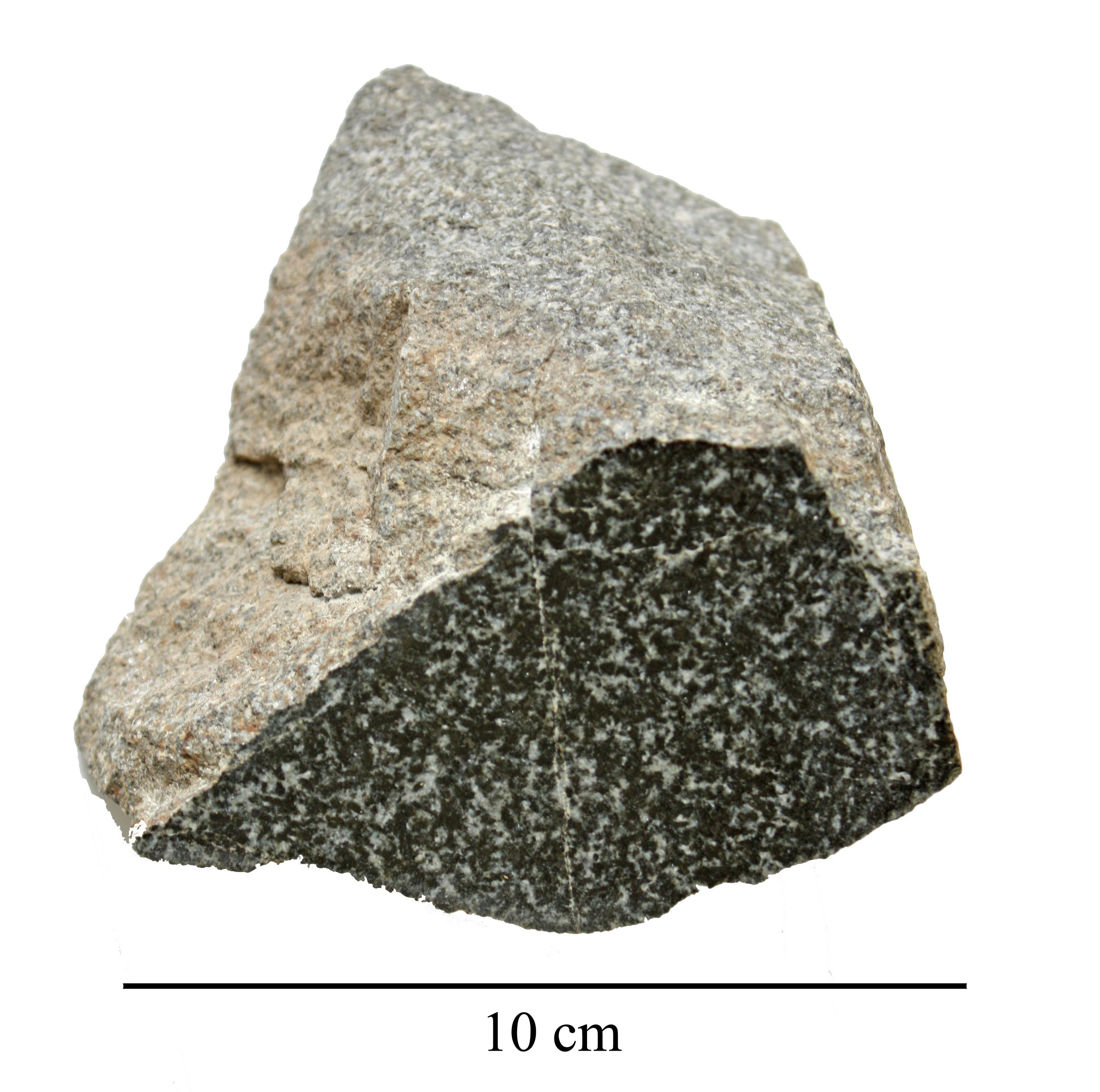
Diabase

Diabase (/ˈdaɪ.əˌbeɪs/), also called dolerite (/ˈdɒl.əˌraɪt/) or microgabbro, is a mafic, holocrystalline, subvolcanic rock chemically equivalent to volcanic basalt or plutonic gabbro. Diabase dikes and sills are typically shallow intrusive bodies and often exhibit fine-grained to aphanitic chilled margins which may contain tachylite (dark mafic glass).

Diabase is the preferred name in North America, while dolerite is the preferred name in the rest of the English-speaking world, where sometimes the name diabase refers to altered dolerites and basalts. Some geologists prefer to avoid confusion by using the name microgabbro.

== Etymology ==
The name diabase comes from the French diabase, and ultimately from the Greek diabasis (διάβασις 'act of crossing over, transition'), whereas the name dolerite comes from the French dolérite, from the Greek dolerós (δολερός 'deceitful, deceptive'), because it was easily confused with diorite.

== Petrography ==
Fair Head, Northern Ireland, a sill of dolerite

Diabase normally has a fine but visible texture of euhedral lath-shaped plagioclase crystals (62%) set in a finer matrix of clinopyroxene, typically augite (20–29%), with minor olivine (3% up to 12% in olivine diabase), magnetite (2%), and ilmenite (2%). Accessory and alteration minerals include hornblende, biotite, apatite, pyrrhotite, chalcopyrite, serpentine, chlorite, and calcite. The texture is termed diabasic and is typical of diabases. This diabasic texture is also termed interstitial. The feldspar is high in anorthite (as opposed to albite), the calcium endmember of the plagioclase anorthite-albite solid solution series, most commonly labradorite.

== Locations ==
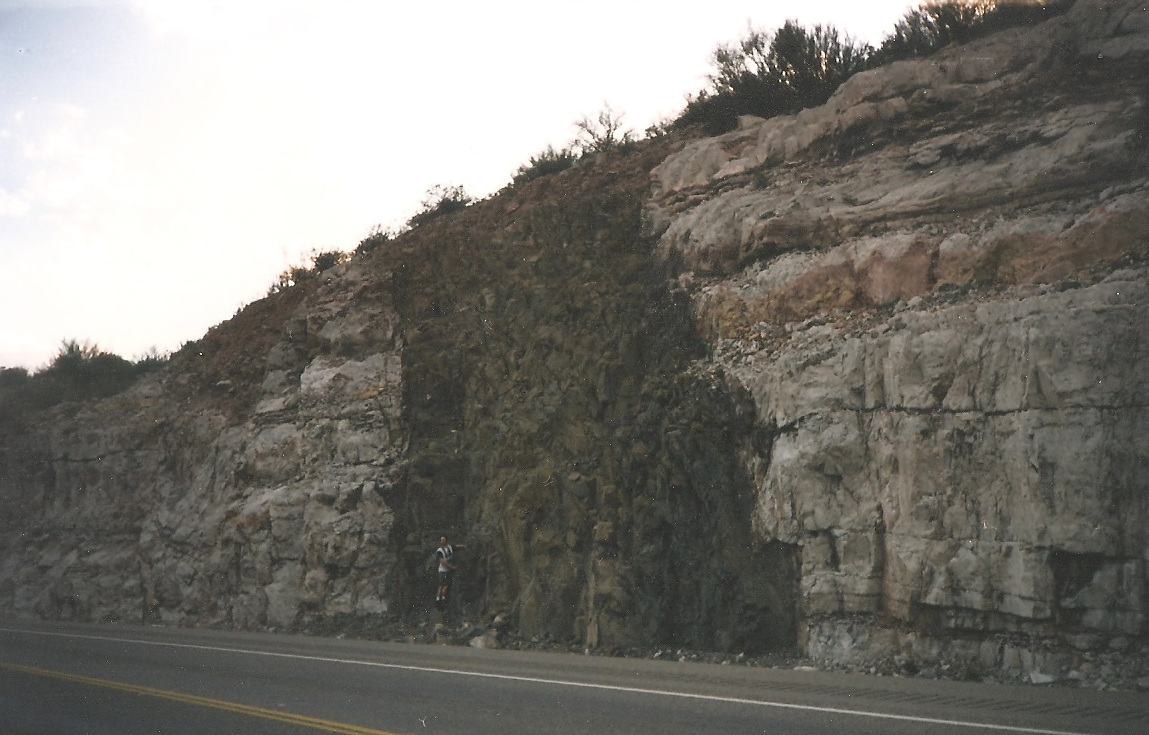
A diabase dike crosscutting horizontal limestone beds in Arizona

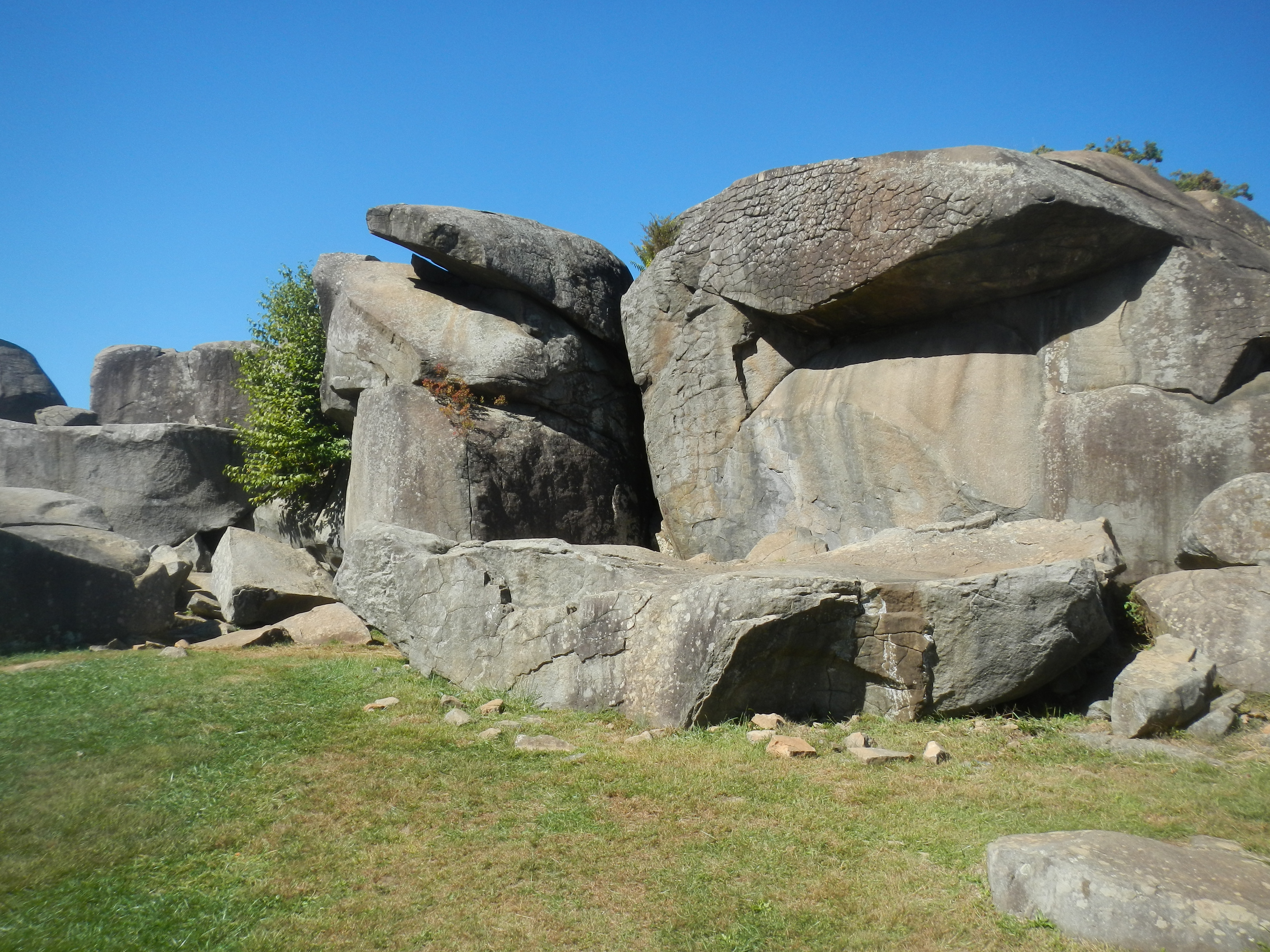
Diabase boulders at Devil's Den on the Gettysburg Battlefield, Pennsylvania, US

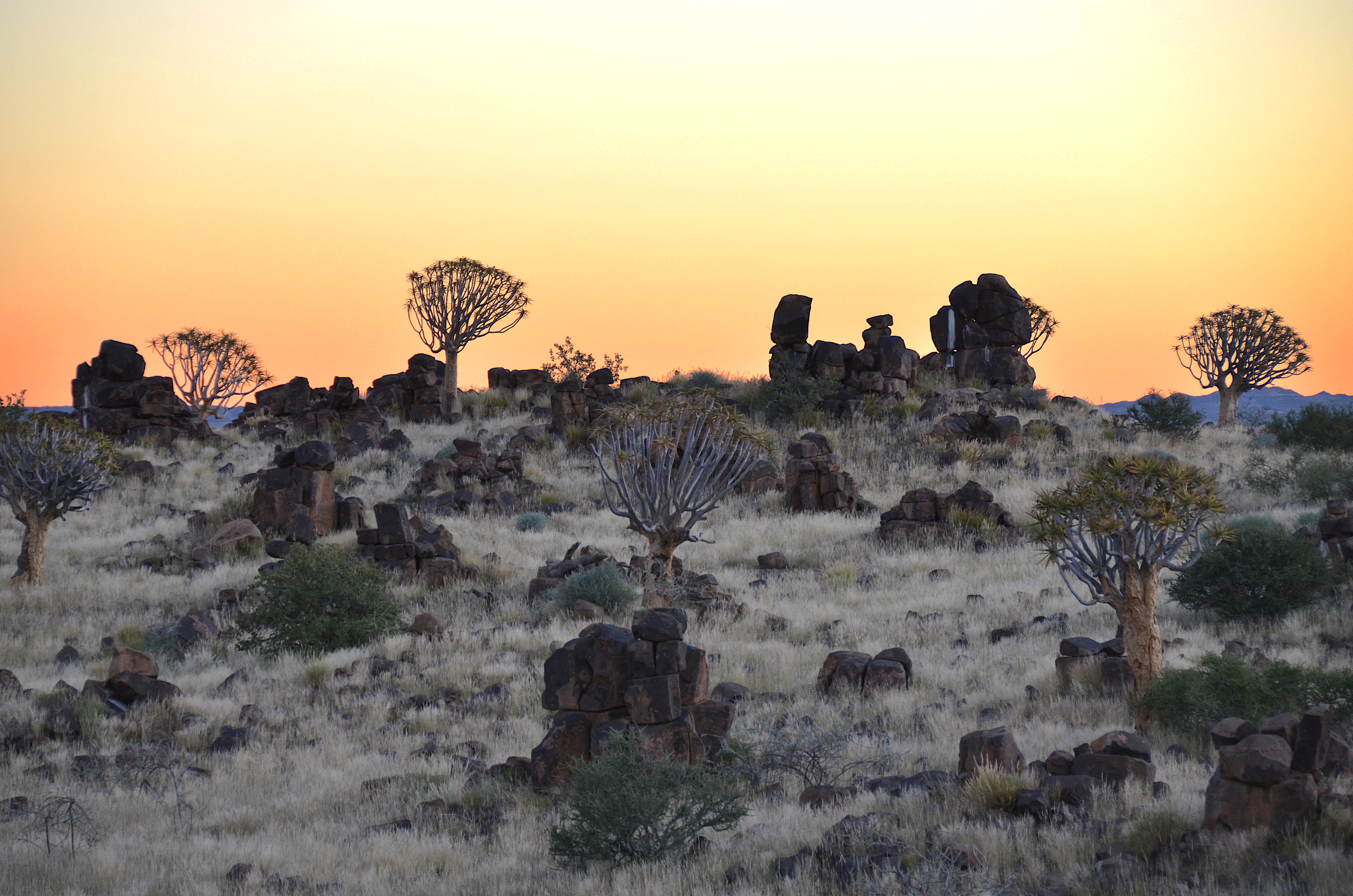
Dolerite rocks and Quiver trees near Keetmanshoop (Namibia)

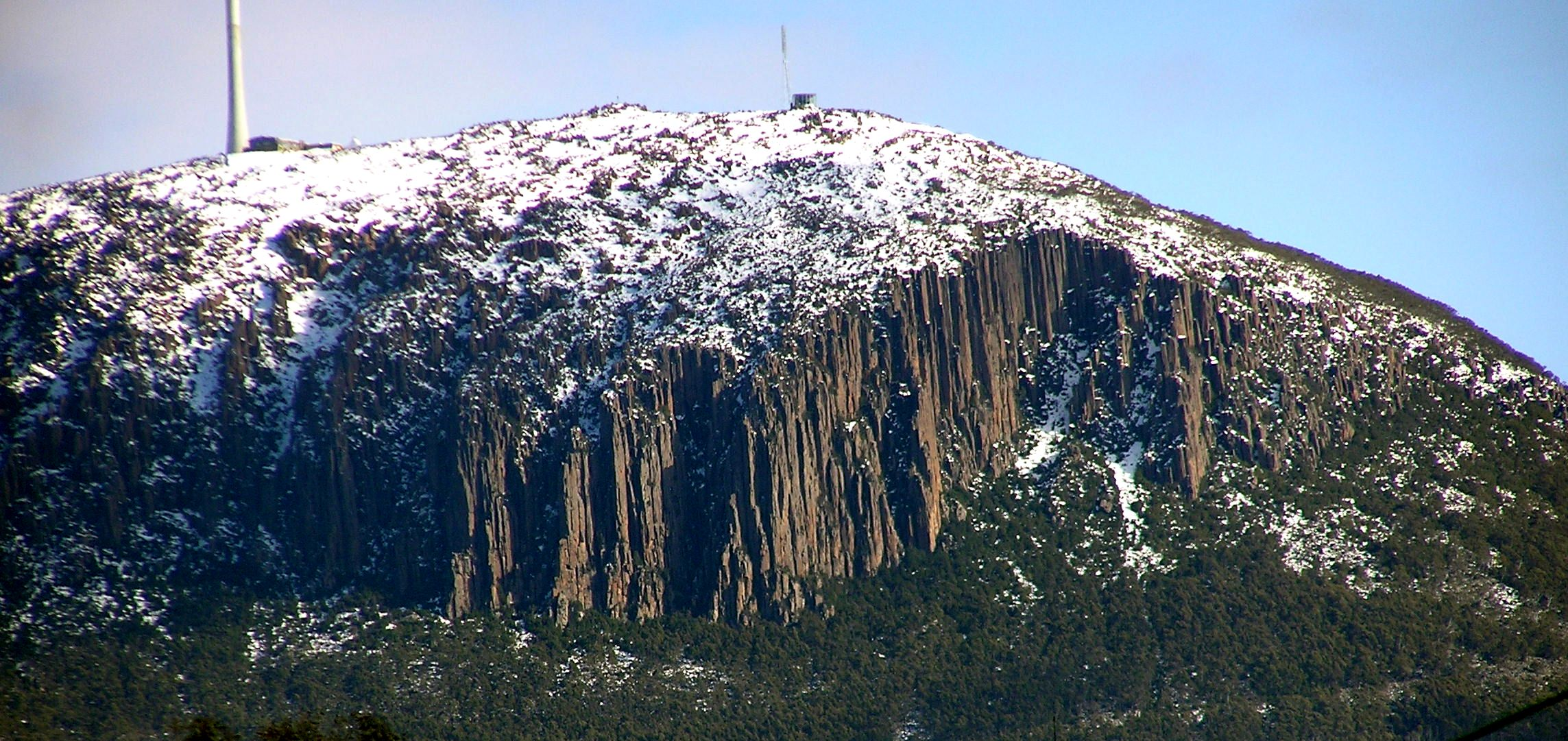
Dolerite forms tall vertical columns throughout Tasmania. These columns form steep vertical features through its alpine areas.

Diabase is usually found in smaller, relatively shallow intrusive bodies such as dikes and sills. Diabase dikes occur in regions of crustal extension and often occur in dike swarms of hundreds of individual dikes or sills radiating from a single volcanic center.

The Palisades Sill which makes up the New Jersey Palisades on the Hudson River, near New York City, New York, United States, is an example of a diabase sill. The dike complexes of the British Tertiary Volcanic Province include Skye, Rum, Mull, and Arran of western Scotland, the Slieve Gullion region of Ireland, and dolerite dike swarms extending across northern England towards the Midlands, for example Rowley Rag. Parts of the Deccan Traps of India, formed at the end of the Cretaceous, also include dolerite. It is also abundant in large parts of Curaçao, an island off the coast of Venezuela. Another example of diabase dikes has been recognized in the Mongo area within the Guéra Massif of Chad in Central Africa.

In the Death Valley region of California, Precambrian diabase intrusions metamorphosed pre-existing dolomite into economically important talc deposits.

In the Thuringian-Franconian-Vogtland Slate Mountains of central Germany the diabase is entirely of Devonian age. They form typical domed landscapes, especially in the Vogtland. One geotourist attraction is the Steinerne Rose near Saalburg, a natural monument, whose present shape is due to the typical weathering of lava pillows.

=== Gondwanaland and Australia ===
A geological event known as the Oenpelli Dolerite intrusive event occurred about 1,720 million years ago in western Arnhem Land, in the Northern Territory, forming curved ridges of Oenpelli Dolerite stretching over 30,000 square kilometres (12,000 sq mi). Further west, on the northern coast of Arnhem Land, a "subsurface radial dyke swarm" known as Galiwinku Dolerite, taking its name from the Aboriginal name for Elcho Island, occurs on the Gove Peninsula and continues under the Arafura Sea and on Wessel Islands, including Elcho and Milingimbi Islands.

In the Yilgarn craton of Western Australia, a Proterozoic 200-kilometre (120 mi) long dolerite dike, the Norseman-Wiluna greenstone belt is associated with the non-alluvial gold mining area between Norseman and Kalgoorlie, which includes the largest gold mine in Australia, the Super Pit gold mine. West of the Norseman–Wiluna Belt is the Yalgoo-Singleton greenstone belt, where complex dolerite dike swarms obscure the volcaniclastic sediments. Large dolerite sills such as the Golden Mile Dolerite can exhibit coarse-grained texture, and show a large diversity in petrography and geochemistry across the width of the sill.

The vast areas of mafic volcanism/plutonism associated with the Jurassic breakup of the Gondwana supercontinent in the Southern Hemisphere include many large diabase/dolerite sills and dike swarms. These include the Karoo dolerites of South Africa, the Ferrar Dolerites of Antarctica, and the largest of these, the most extensive of all dolerite formations worldwide, are found in Tasmania. Here, the volume of magma which intruded into a thin veneer of Permian and Triassic rocks from multiple feeder sites, over a period of perhaps a million years, may have exceeded 40,000 cubic kilometres. In Tasmania, dolerite dominates much of the landscape, particularly alpine areas, with many examples of columnar jointing.

Early Jurassic activity resulted in the formation of dolerite intrusion in Prospect in Sydney, and quarrying of basalt for roadstone and other building materials has been an important activity there for over 180 years.

== Use ==
Diabase is crushed and used as a construction aggregate for road beds, buildings, railroad beds (rail ballast), and within dams and levees.

Diabase can be cut for use as headstones and memorials; the base of the Marine Corps War Memorial is made of black diabase "granite" (a commercial term, not actual granite). Diabase can also be cut for use as ornamental stone for countertops, facing stone on buildings, and paving. A form of dolerite, known as bluestone, is one of the materials used in the construction of Stonehenge.

Diabase also serves as local building stone. In Tasmania, where it is one of the most common rocks found, it is used for building, for landscaping and to erect dry-stone farm walls. In northern County Down, Northern Ireland, "dolerite" is used in buildings such as Mount Stewart together with Scrabo Sandstone as both are quarried at Scrabo Hill.

Balls of diabase were used by the ancient Egyptians as pounding tools for working softer (but still hard) stones.

== See also ==
- List of rock types
