= Rowley Rag =

Rowley Rag is a volcanic dolerite stone that was quarried in the stone quarries (known locally as the 'Quacks') of the Rowley Hills in the West Midlands, England, straddling the border of Rowley Regis and Dudley. The main quarry was on Turner's Hill, and in the 1960s was, in fact, two separate quarries, the Edwin Richards and Hailstone quarries, with a road between them leading to the top of the hill. At that time, hexagonal pillars similar to those of the Giant's Causeway in Northern Ireland could be seen on one of the quarry faces. The Edwin Richards quarry was combined with the Hailstone quarry by removing the disused road between them. It remained active until 2008, operated by Midland Quarry Products.

The Rowley dolerite is an intrusion of late Carboniferous age in the form of a lopolith. The country rock consists of the Etruria Marl Formation.

The main use of the Rowley Rag stone was in the production of road surfaces and kerbstones.

A public house in the village of Whiteheath was named after this rock, highlighting the importance of this naturally occurring product in this area of the Black Country.

William Withering, a member of the Lunar Society, studied the chemical composition of Rowley Rag, and gave a paper including this study to the Royal Society in the 18th century.
