= Lewisham West (London County Council constituency) =

London County Council constituency

- Former constituency for the London County Council

Former constituency
- Created: 1919
- Abolished: 1965
- Member(s): 2 (to 1949); 3 (from 1949)
- Created from: Lewisham

Lewisham West was a constituency used for elections to the London County Council between 1919 and the council's abolition, in 1965. The seat shared boundaries with the UK Parliament constituency of the same name.

== Councillors ==
Year	Name	Party	Name	Party	Name	Party
1919	Philip Dawson	Municipal Reform	Robert Jackson	Municipal Reform	Two seats until 1949	
1922	Edward Campbell	Municipal Reform	Percival Harry Reed	Municipal Reform	Two seats until 1949	
1925	Ernest George Sawyer	Municipal Reform	Percival Harry Reed	Municipal Reform	Two seats until 1949	
1926	Frederick Leigh-Pollitt	Municipal Reform	Percival Harry Reed	Municipal Reform	Two seats until 1949	
1931	Frederick Leigh-Pollitt	Municipal Reform	Geoffrey Richards	Municipal Reform	Two seats until 1949	
1937	Rupert Brabner	Municipal Reform	Malcolm Campbell-Johnston	Municipal Reform	Two seats until 1949	
1938	Rupert Brabner	Municipal Reform	Geoffrey Paul Hardy-Roberts	Municipal Reform	Two seats until 1949	
1945	Henry Brooke	Municipal Reform	Geoffrey Paul Hardy-Roberts	Municipal Reform	Two seats until 1949	
1946	George Bradfield	Conservative	Henry Price	Conservative	Two seats until 1949	
1949	George Bradfield	Conservative	Henry Price	Conservative	Florence Ruston	Conservative
1952	George Bradfield	Conservative	Colin Mann	Conservative	Florence Ruston	Conservative
1958	George Bradfield	Conservative	Raine Spencer	Conservative	Betty Vernon	Labour
1961	George Bradfield	Conservative	Raine Spencer	Conservative	Norman Banks	Conservative

== Election results ==
1919 London County Council election: Lewisham West
Party	Candidate	Votes	%	±%
Municipal Reform	Philip Dawson	3,438	27.2	
Municipal Reform	Robert Jackson	3,320	26.3	
Progressive	Frank Raffety	2,950	23.4	
Progressive	G. H. Stepney	2,915	23.1	
Majority		370	2.9	
Municipal Reform hold		Swing		
Municipal Reform hold		Swing		

1922 London County Council election: Lewisham West
Party	Candidate	Votes	%	±%
Municipal Reform	Edward Campbell	8,680	35.4	+8.2
Municipal Reform	Percival Reed	8,197	33.4	+7.1
Progressive	Arthur Evans	4,013	16.4	−7.0
Progressive	G. H. Stepney	3,644	14.9	−8.2
Majority		4,184	17.0	+14.1
Municipal Reform hold		Swing		
Municipal Reform hold		Swing		

1925 London County Council election: Lewisham West
Party	Candidate	Votes	%	±%
Municipal Reform	Ernest George Sawyer	6,652		
Municipal Reform	Percival Reed	6,639		
Labour	E. J. B. Kirtlan	2,500		
Labour	W. J. Tozer	2,439		
Progressive	G. H. Stepney	1,602		
Progressive	G. E. Wakefield	1,586		
Majority				
Municipal Reform hold		Swing		
Municipal Reform hold		Swing		

1928 London County Council election: Lewisham West
Party	Candidate	Votes	%	±%
Municipal Reform	Percival Reed	8,296		
Municipal Reform	Frederick Leigh-Pollitt	8,264		
Labour	George Burgneay	3,177		
Labour	Catherine Mary Wadham	3,129		
Liberal	E. G. Hardy	2,641		
Liberal	A. Smith	2,546		
Majority				
Municipal Reform hold		Swing		
Municipal Reform hold		Swing		

1931 London County Council election: Lewisham West
Party	Candidate	Votes	%	±%
Municipal Reform	Frederick Leigh-Pollitt	9,332		
Municipal Reform	Geoffrey Richards	9,290		
Labour	C. E. Garnon	3,265		
Labour	E. Z. Waddington	3,228		
Majority				
Municipal Reform hold		Swing		
Municipal Reform hold		Swing		

1934 London County Council election: Lewisham West
Party	Candidate	Votes	%	±%
Municipal Reform	Frederick Leigh-Pollitt	9,131		
Municipal Reform	Geoffrey Richards	8,815		
Labour	Caroline Maule	4,705		
Labour	V. Grimmitt	4,617		
Majority				
Municipal Reform hold		Swing		
Municipal Reform hold		Swing		

1937 London County Council election: Lewisham West
Party	Candidate	Votes	%	±%
Municipal Reform	Malcolm Campbell-Johnston	11,895		
Municipal Reform	Rupert Brabner	11,677		
Labour	B. Grimmitt	7,658		
Labour	J. Martin	7,493		
Majority				
Municipal Reform hold		Swing		
Municipal Reform hold		Swing		

Lewisham West by-election, 1938
Party	Candidate	Votes	%	±%
Municipal Reform	Geoffrey Paul Hardy-Roberts	Unopposed	N/A	N/A
Municipal Reform hold		Swing		

1946 London County Council election: Lewisham West
Party	Candidate	Votes	%	±%
Conservative	George Bradfield	10,219		
Conservative	Henry Price	10,089		
Labour	F. W. Pettitt	9,511		
Labour	A. R. Franks	9,478		
Majority				
Conservative hold		Swing		
Conservative hold		Swing		

1949 London County Council election: Lewisham West
Party	Candidate	Votes	%	±%
Conservative	Henry Price	18,226		
Conservative	Florence Ruston	17,897		
Conservative	George Bradfield	17,472		
Labour	Henry Brinton	13,016		
Labour	K. Hendy	12,812		
Labour	Donald Piers Chesworth	12,567		
Conservative win (new seat)				
Conservative hold		Swing		
Conservative hold		Swing		

1952 London County Council election: Lewisham West
Party	Candidate	Votes	%	±%
Conservative	Florence Ruston	15,840		
Conservative	Colin Mann	15,586		
Conservative	George Bradfield	15,224		
Labour	N. M. Huggett	14,911		
Labour	Betty Vernon	14,500		
Labour	H. Solomons	14,395		
Liberal	H. A. Day	1,703		
Liberal	H. G. Robinson	1,427		
Liberal	C. B. Maeve-Marsh	1,290		
Conservative hold		Swing		
Conservative hold		Swing		
Conservative hold		Swing		

1955 London County Council election: Lewisham West
Party	Candidate	Votes	%	±%
Conservative	George Bradfield	14,335		
Conservative	Florence Ruston	14,207		
Conservative	Colin Mann	14,119		
Labour	S. Norwood	11,183		
Labour	J. C. Henry	11,166		
Labour	Betty Vernon	11,130		
Liberal	K. V. Hearn	1,514		
Liberal	H. G. Robinson	1,449		
Liberal	H. Beecher	1,402		
Conservative hold		Swing		
Conservative hold		Swing		
Conservative hold		Swing		

1958 London County Council election: Lewisham West
Party	Candidate	Votes	%	±%
Conservative	Raine Spencer	12,520		
Labour	Betty Vernon	12,513		
Conservative	George Bradfield	12,455		
Labour	J. C. Henry	12,375		
Conservative	Colin Mann	12,286		
Labour	C. W. J. Bird	12,265		
Labour gain from Conservative		Swing		
Conservative hold		Swing		
Conservative hold		Swing		

1961 London County Council election: Lewisham West
Party	Candidate	Votes	%	±%
Conservative	George Bradfield	13,817		
Conservative	Raine Spencer	13,775		
Conservative	Norman Banks	13,589		
Labour	J. C. Henry	11,430		
Labour	Betty Vernon	11,217		
Labour	Joan Lestor	11,157		
Conservative gain from Labour		Swing		
Conservative hold		Swing		
Conservative hold		Swing		
