= Lewisham West =

Lewisham West could refer to:

- Lewisham West (UK Parliament constituency)
- Lewisham West (electoral division), Greater London Council
- Lewisham West (London County Council constituency)
