= Lewisham (disambiguation) =

Lewisham is a district of London, England.

Lewisham could also refer to:

- London Borough of Lewisham
- Metropolitan Borough of Lewisham, former local government district, 1900–1965
- Lewisham District (Metropolis), former local government district, 1855–1900
- Lewisham (London County Council constituency), former constituency, 1889–1919
- Lewisham (UK Parliament constituency), former constituency, 1885–1918
- Lewisham, New South Wales, a suburb of Sydney, Australia
- Lewisham, Tasmania, a locality in Tasmania, Australia
- The Battle of Lewisham, a conflict involving the far-right National Front and counter-demonstrators.

== See also ==
- Love and Mr. Lewisham, by H. G. Wells.
