= 1921 Lewisham West by-election =

UK parliamentary by-election

← 1918	13 September 1921	1922 →

Candidate	Dawson	Windham	Raffety
Party	Unionist	Anti-Waste League	Liberal
Popular vote	9,427	8,580	6,211
Percentage	38.9%	35.4%	25.6%
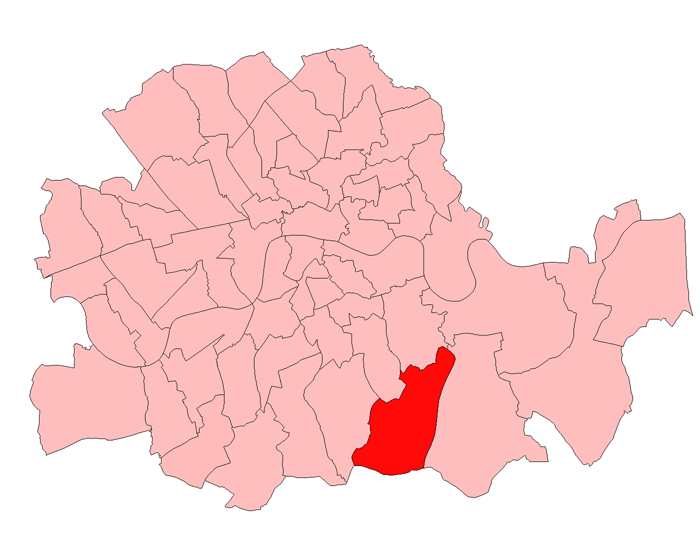
MP before election
Coates
Unionist
Subsequent MP
Dawson
Unionist

The 1921 Lewisham West by-election was a by-election held on 13 September 1921 for the British House of Commons constituency of Lewisham West.

== Vacancy ==
The by-election was triggered by the death of the serving Unionist Member of Parliament (MP), Sir Edward Coates.

== Electoral history ==
This was considered a normally safe Conservative seat - Coates had been unopposed at the preceding general election;

General election 1918
Party		Candidate	Votes	%	±%
C	Unionist	Edward Coates	Unopposed		
	Unionist hold				
C indicates candidate endorsed by the coalition government.

== Candidates ==
- The Unionist candidate was Sir Philip Dawson, who represented the district on London County Council.
- He was opposed by Lieutenant-Commander W. G. Windham of the Anti-Waste League, and
- Frank Raffety, an Independent Liberal.

== Campaign ==
Excessive government expenditure was a major theme of the campaign: Dawson ran under the 'Conservative and Anti-Waste' banner, and Raffety also proclaimed himself an opponent of high spending.

No other major issues separated the candidates - all, for instance, declared themselves in favour of proportional representation - and the National Union of Societies for Equal Citizenship, who questioned all three on behalf of women voters, declined to make a recommendation. Dawson won the support of the Middle Classes Union. The only point of controversy consisted of rumours which circulated to the effect that Dawson, who had worked for the Ministry of Munitions during the war, was a foreigner. He responded, according to The Times, by issuing a leaflet entitled 'Dirt' which insisted that he was of pure British stock, and produced details. An article in The Washington Post claimed that he admitted to being the illegitimate son of Field Marshal Sir Neville Chamberlain, and to have originally been given the surname Duvalle.

== Result ==
The result was a close three-way fight, with Dawson elected with a majority of only 847. British Pathe has newsreel footage of Dawson emerging victorious from the count. http://www.britishpathe.com/video/sir-philip-dawson/query/election

Lewisham West by-election, 1921
Party	Candidate	Votes	%	±%
Unionist	Philip Dawson	9,427	38.9	N/A
Anti-Waste League	Walter George Windham	8,580	35.4	New
Liberal	Frank Raffety	6,211	25.6	New
Majority		847	3.5	N/A
Turnout		24,218	59.2	N/A
Unionist hold		Swing	N/A	

== Aftermath ==
Dawson would go on to hold the seat until his death 17 years later.

General election 15 November 1922
Party	Candidate	Votes	%	±%
Unionist	Philip Dawson	16,216	65.7	N/A
Liberal	Barrett Lennard Albemarle O'Malley	8,469	34.3	N/A
Majority		7,747	31.4	N/A
Turnout		24,685	58.1	N/A
Unionist hold		Swing	N/A	

== See also ==
- List of United Kingdom by-elections
- Lewisham West constituency
