= 1923 Prime Minister Honours =

British government recognitions

The 1923 Prime Minister Honours were announced on 8 February 1923, the list of political appointments was recommended by the Prime Minister Bonar Law. The list was not issued as part of the 1923 New Year Honours as it was delayed to allow scrutiny by a Privy Council committee following a recommendation of a Royal Commission on Honours. It was sometimes known as the "Short Honours List".

== Viscount ==
- Sir George Younger, Bt., Chairman of the Unionist Party Organisation since 1 January 1917.

== Baron ==
- Rt Hon Herbert Pike Pease MP for Darlington and Assistant Postmaster-General 1915-1922.
- Sir Owen Philipps GCMG who was an MP from 1906 to 1922.

== Privy Councillor ==
- John Frederick Peel Rawlinson KC, MP for Cambridge University since 1906.

== Baronets ==
- Lieutenant-Colonel Sir James Philip Reynolds, DSO, TD, JP for public and political services in Lancashire.
- Colonel Charles Rosdew Burn, MP for Torquay since 1919.
- Lieutenant-Colonel Sir Frederick Hall, KBE, DSO, MP for Dulwich since 1910.
- Joseph Henry Kaye for public and political services in Huddersfield.

== Knight Grand Cross of the Order of the British Empire (GBE) ==
- Sir John Malcolm Fraser, Bt., Honorary Principal Agent for the Unionist Party.

== Knight Bachelor ==
- Alfred Appleby, JP for public and political services in Newcastle upon Tyne.
- Commander Walter George Windham, for public and political services.
- George Wigley, for public and political services in Nottingham.
- George Duncan Grey, LLD, for public and political services in Weston-super-Mare.
- Ernest Gardner, MP from 1901 to 1922.
