= Air cargo =

Any property carried or to be carried in an aircraft

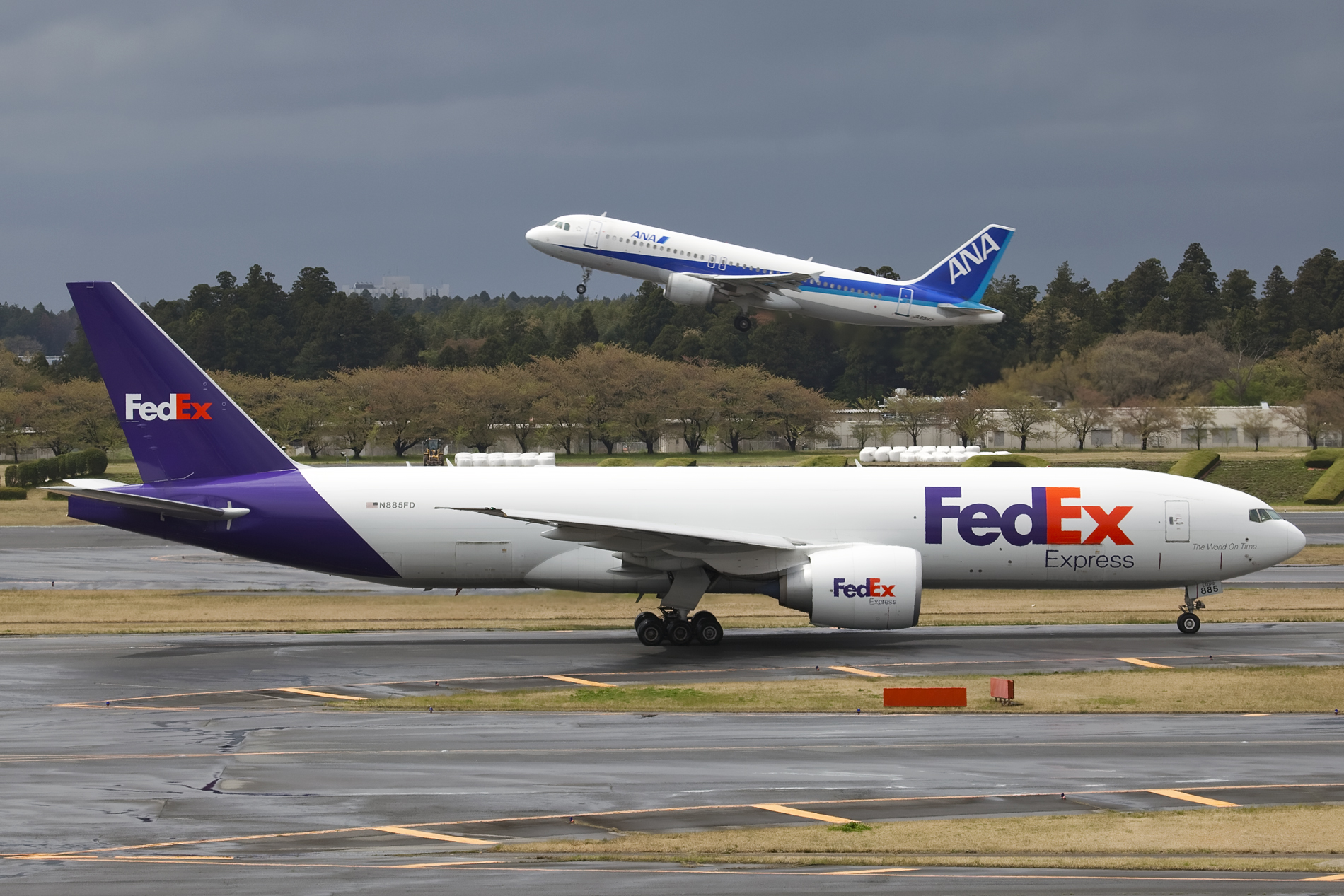
A FedEx Express Boeing 777F taxiing at Narita International Airport in Tokyo, Japan in 2012

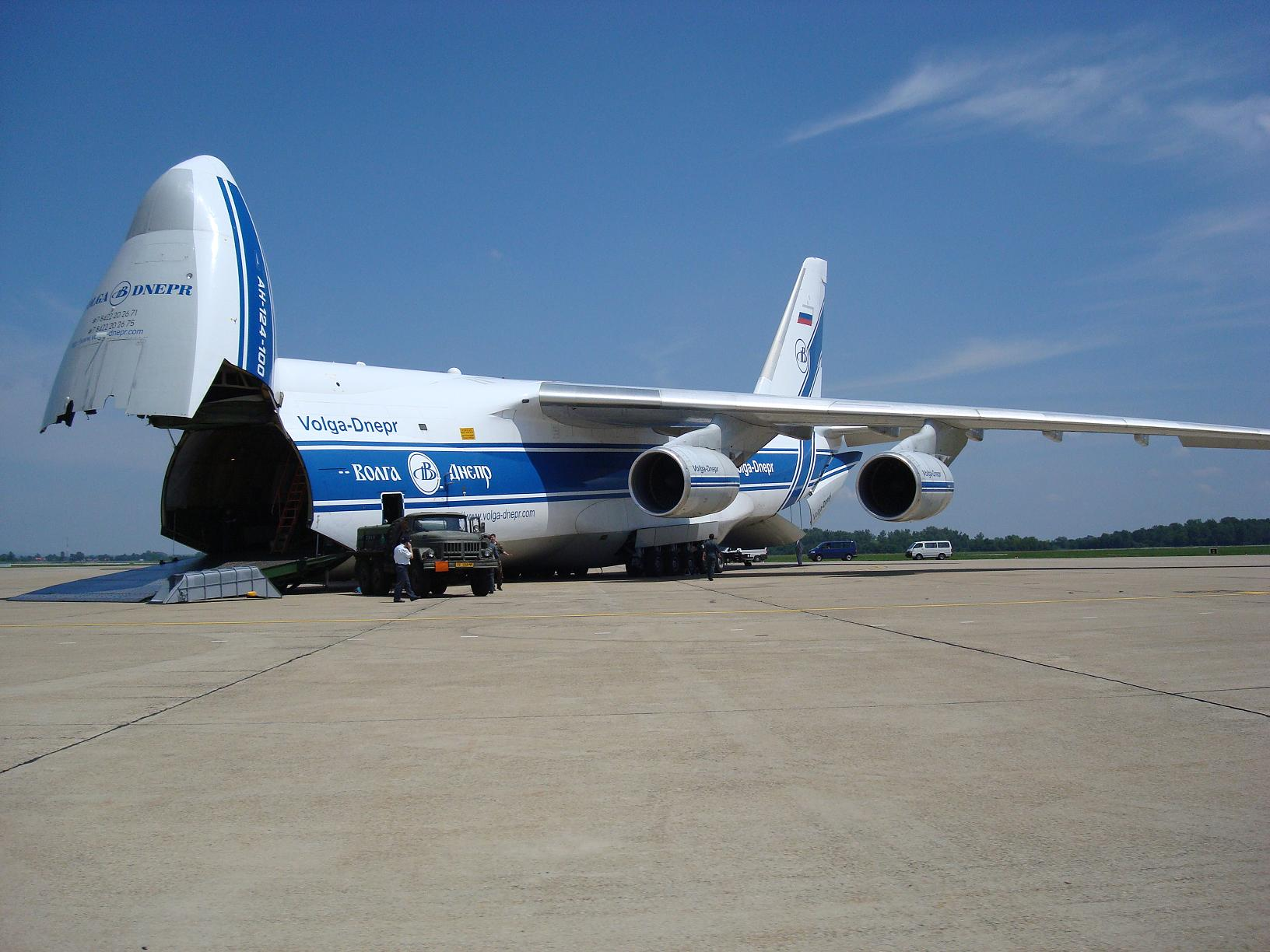
A Volga-Dnepr Airlines An-124 cargo aircraft ready for loading in 2008

Global air transport by country and freight level as of 2017 (ton-km)

Air cargo is any property carried or to be carried in an aircraft. Air cargo comprises air freight, air express and airmail.

== Aircraft types ==
Different cargo can be transported by passenger, cargo or combi aircraft:

- Passenger aircraft use the spare volume in the airplane's baggage hold (the "belly") that is not being used for passenger luggage—a common practice used by passenger airlines, who additionally transport cargo on scheduled passenger flights. Cargo can also be transported in the passenger cabin as hand-carry by an "on-board courier". This practice can often be used to cross subsidise loss-making passenger routes that would otherwise be uneconomical to operate. A passenger aircraft can also be used as a preighter in which the entire passenger cabin is temporarily dedicated to carrying freight.
- Cargo aircraft are dedicated for the job—they carry freight on the main deck and in the belly by means of nose-loading or side loading.
- Combi aircraft carry cargo on part of the main deck, before or after a passengers’ section, with side loading, and in the belly.

== History ==
=== 20th century ===
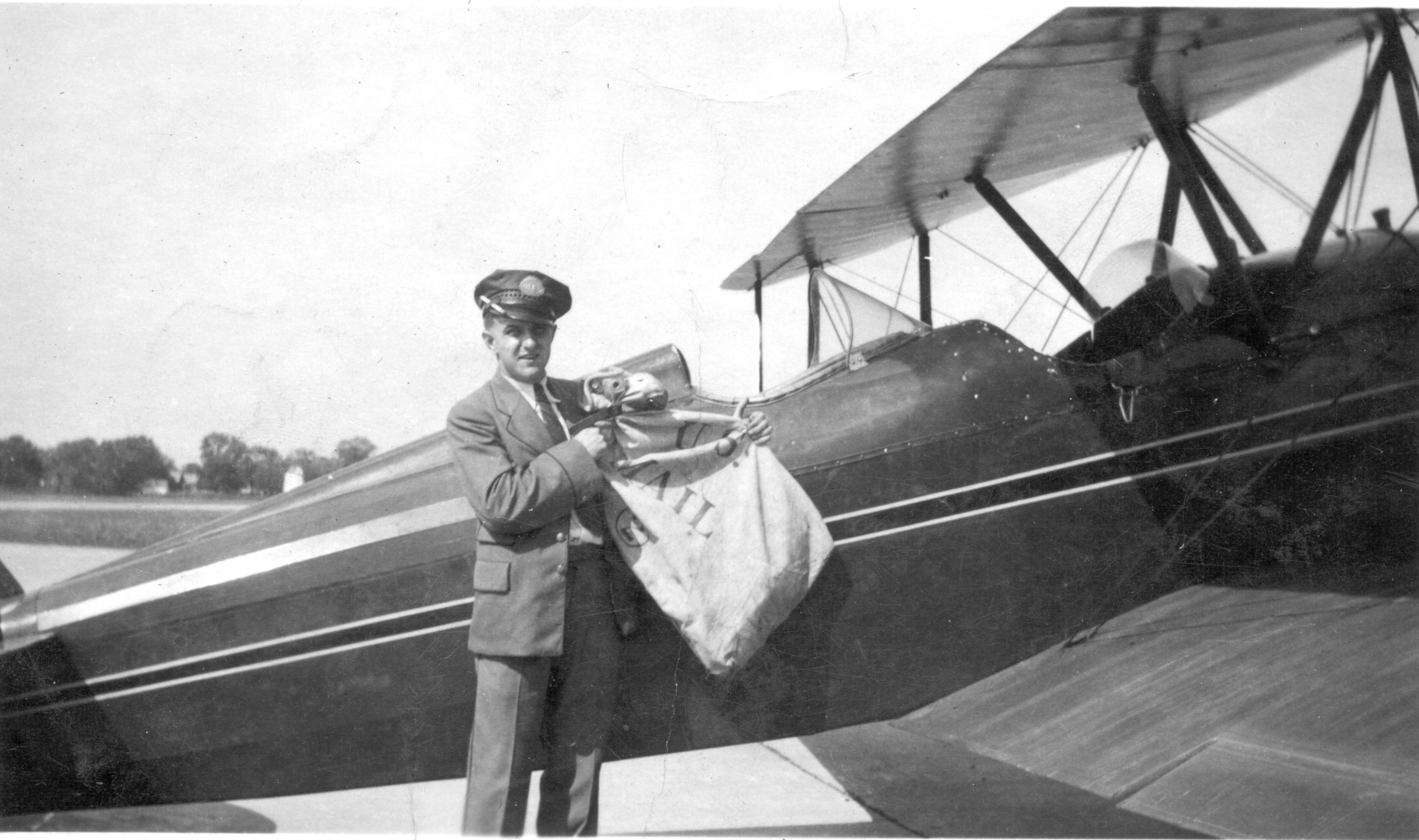
Loading airmail cargo in Detroit in the late 1930s

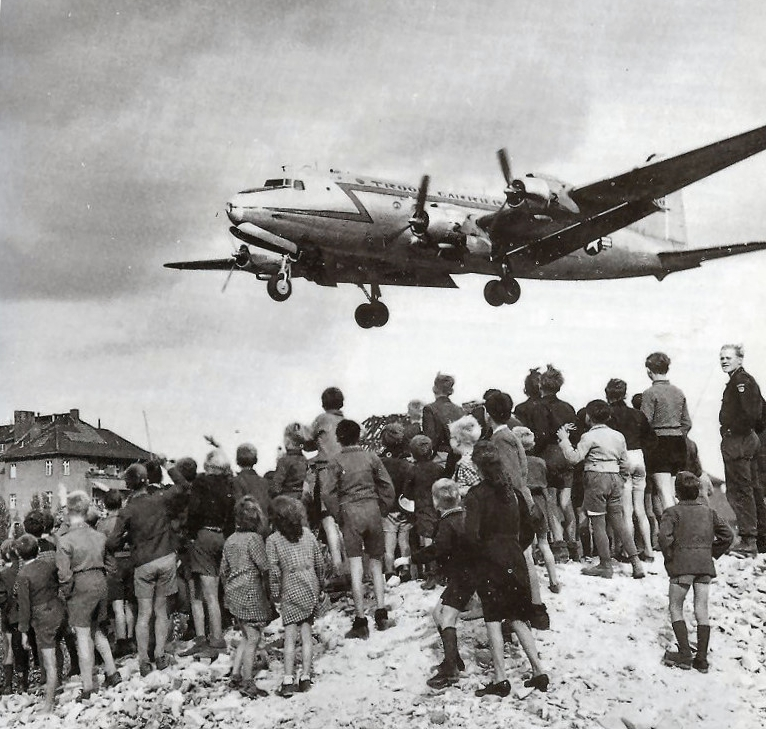
A Douglas C-54 at Berlin Tempelhof Airport during the Berlin Blockade in 1948

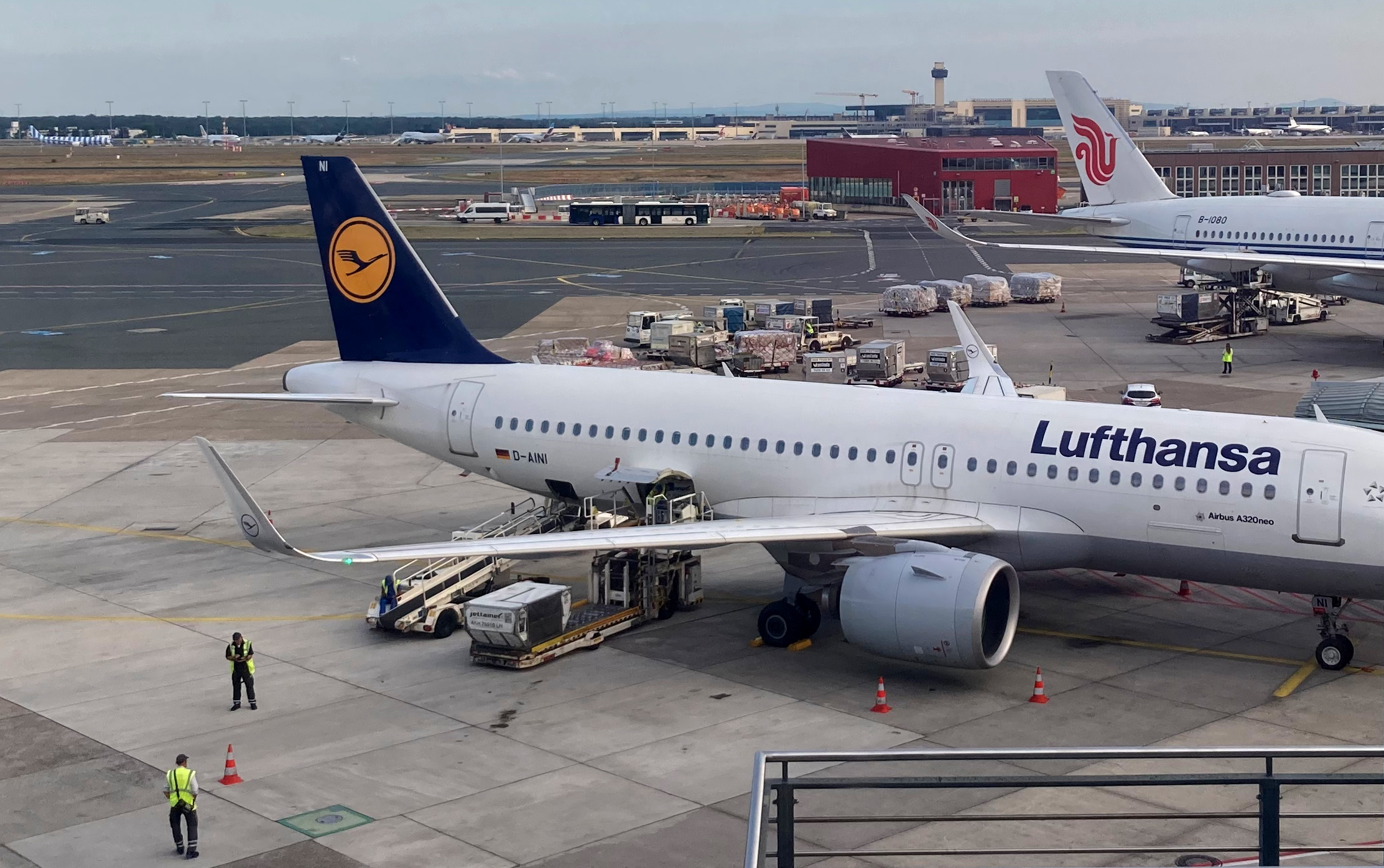
Cargo processing at Frankfurt Airport

The first cargo flight took place on the 7 November 1910 in the U.S. between Dayton and Columbus in Ohio. Philip Orin Parmelee piloted a Wright Model B aeroplane 65 miles (105 km) carrying a package of 200 pounds of silk for the opening of a store. Newspaper clippings quoted the Wright brothers as stating he covered the distance in 66 minutes, but the flight was officially recorded at 57 minutes, a world speed record at the time. It was the first "cargo only" flight solely for the transport of goods; the first flight commissioned by a client, and the first example of multimodal air transport, since the pieces of silk were transported by car from Columbus aerodrome to the store.

The world's first official airmail flight by airplane took place on 18 February 1911, at a large exhibition in the United Provinces of Agra and Oudh, British India. The organizer of the aviation display, Walter Windham, was able to secure permission from the postmaster general in India to operate an airmail service in order to generate publicity for the exhibition and to raise money for charity. This first airmail flight was piloted by Henri Pequet, who flew 6,500 letters a distance of 13 km (8.1 mi), from Allahabad to Naini—the nearest station on the Bombay-Calcutta line to the exhibition. The aircraft used was a Humber-Sommer biplane with about fifty horsepower (37 kW), and it made the journey in thirteen minutes.

The world's first scheduled airmail post service took place in the United Kingdom between the London suburb of Hendon, and the Postmaster General's office in Windsor, Berkshire, on September 9, 1911. It was part of the celebrations for King George V's coronation and at the suggestion of Windham, who based his proposal on the successful experiment he had overseen in India. The service ran for just under a month, transporting 35 bags of mail in 16 flights.

In the early 1920s, air cargo developed rapidly because numerous entrepreneurs realized aircraft could move high value and low volume consignments much faster than the railroads and shipping companies. The first scheduled flight from London to Paris in 1919 had only one passenger, but carried leather for a shoe manufacturer and grouse for a restaurant. Cinema films were also a frequent consignment: original news’ bulletins were first carried to a central laboratory to make copies, and then distributed by air throughout Europe for their release in cinemas.

Although there were a few attempts to organize air freight airlines from the 1920s on, the first commercial airlines that were all-cargo did not emerge until after World War II.

==== World War II ====
In 1945, at a conference in Havana, 57 airlines formed the International Air Transport Association.

In 1948, Berlin was jointly controlled by the Western Allies and Soviet Union, although the Soviet Union held the area surrounding the city and thus land access. During the Berlin Blockade, this land access was closed, and an airlift remained the only option to get increasingly urgent deliveries of food, coal, and other supplies to West Berlin. Over 330 days to 12 May 1949 a total of 2.26 million tons of cargo were airlifted to Berlin, an average of 6,800 tons a day, 80% by the US and 20% by the UK.

==== Post-World War II ====
Although freight traffic developed modestly, reaching only 800,000 tonnes worldwide by the mid-1950s, the world economy was hitting its post-World War II stride. Germany and Japan were emerging from their period of purgatory and were poised to take the world of business by storm, the United States was approaching the height of its economic dominance, and Western Europe had recovered from the war. In 1968, Boeing launched the four engine 747, the first wide-body aircraft. The 747 was the first aircraft capable of transporting full pallets in the cargo hold, revolutionizing the air cargo industry.

Despite widespread hopes for a vibrant industry, for decades the air freight sector did not grow as expected and remained a very small part of total air traffic. For much of the first five post-war decades, most carriers saw it as a secondary activity, although there had always been specialized cargo airlines. Some passenger airlines have found the practice of carrying belly cargo to be a highly lucrative enterprise; in fact, it is estimated that 50% of all air freight is moved in this way, to the point where it has lessened the demand for dedicated large cargo aircraft.

Cargo emerged as a solid pillar of the industry in the 1990s. The catalysts for the renewed growth in the sector were the express parcel carriers, typified by FedEx, DHL, PostNL, and UPS, and changes in practices in the manufacturing sector. In 1992, FedEx sent software on computer disks to thousands of customers, allowing them to track shipments from their own workstations.

=== 21st century ===
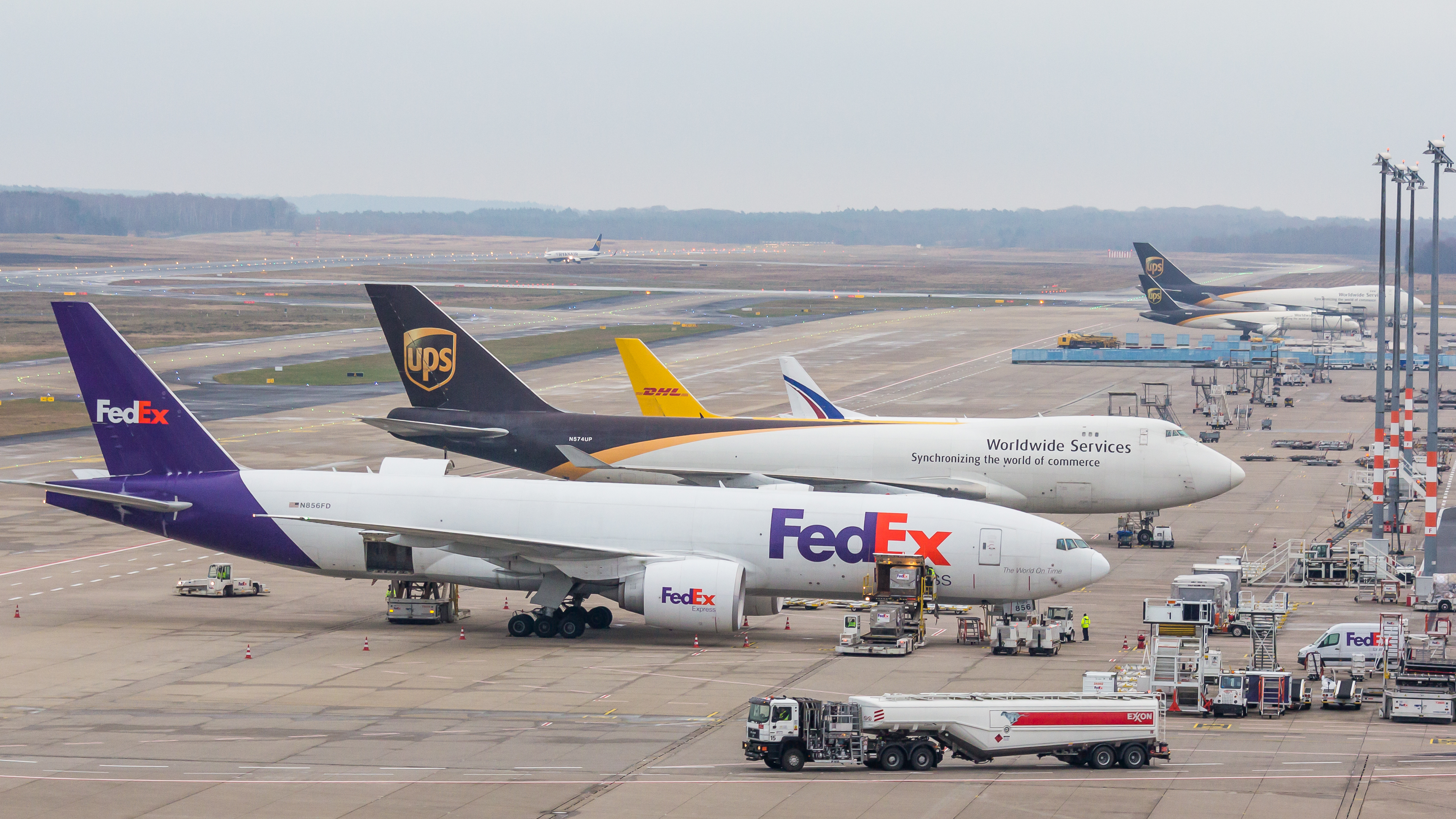
A FedEx Boeing 777, a UPS Boeing 747-400, and a DHL tail cargo planes at Cologne Bonn Airport in 2016

Cargo airports in the United States by weight landed

The rise of internet in the years that followed contributed to increase the reliability and accessibility to the air cargo industry. Most airlines now offer to their customers real-time flight status and the booking and tracking options. In addition, the industry is adopting electronic procedures, such as the electronic air waybill, to reduce the amount of paper documentation accompanying each shipment and increasing the security and safety of the transportation. Many retailers are making an effort to integrate the air cargo delivery process with their customer service offering to respond to increasing consumer pressure.

An industry expert estimates that 15-20 tonnes of air cargo is worth 30-40 economy passenger seats, when both are on passenger planes.

However, with the exception of the integrators (FedEx, UPS, DHL and TNT) the air cargo industry continues to suffer as the by-product 'poor-relation' of the passenger business.

In 2017, the IATA observed a 9% rise in freight tonne kilometers: air cargo demand is strong due to industrial production and global trade growth above expansion of e-commerce, outpacing capacity as available tonne kilometers grew by 3%. Boeing doubled its 767F production since 2016 to three per month in 2020, and anticipates that total global air cargo traffic will more than double by 2041.

== See also ==
- Timeline of Air Cargo
- Airlift by military
- Antonov An-225, world's biggest aircraft
- History of aviation
- List of busiest airports by cargo traffic
