= Civil Mediation Council =

The Civil Mediation Council (CMC) is the recognised authority in England and Wales for all matters related to civil, commercial, workplace and other non-family mediation. It is the first point of contact for the Government, the judiciary, the legal profession and industry on mediation issues.

The CMC is a not for profit company limited by guarantee and operates as a charity. It has more than 400 members and provides major conferences and forums

CMC operates an accreditation scheme for organisations that provide mediation services. The Ministry of Justice has used the accreditation scheme as a mark of quality assurance.

== Membership ==
=== General Member ===
Anyone with an interest in mediation can become a general member of the CMC, whether or not they are a mediator. Membership is also open to corporate and other bodies. The CMC provides information on mediation and also several training events throughout the year.

=== Registered Member ===
Registered membership is open to mediators and mediation providers. The main requirements for registration are:

- successful completion of an assessed training course
- current mediator experience
- adherence to an acceptable ethical code (e.g. the EU Model Code of Conduct for Mediators)
- professional indemnity insurance cover
- continuing professional development
- a published complaints procedure

== Background ==
CMC was established in 2003 under the chairmanship of Lord Justice Sir Brian Neill . It was created to be the neutral and independent body to represent and to promote civil and commercial mediation as alternatives to litigation and thereby to further law reform and access to justice for the general public. It followed an initiative by mediator and barrister Jonathan Dingle to build on unsuccessful attempts to provide a single unified voice for civil and commercial mediation in the United Kingdom.

On 11 December 2007, the CMC elected Gordon Slynn as its President and Lord Justice Henry Brooke as its Chairman.
