= William Legge, 6th Earl of Dartmouth =

British peer and Conservative politician

The Right Honourable The Earl of Dartmouth GCVO KCB VD TD PC JP
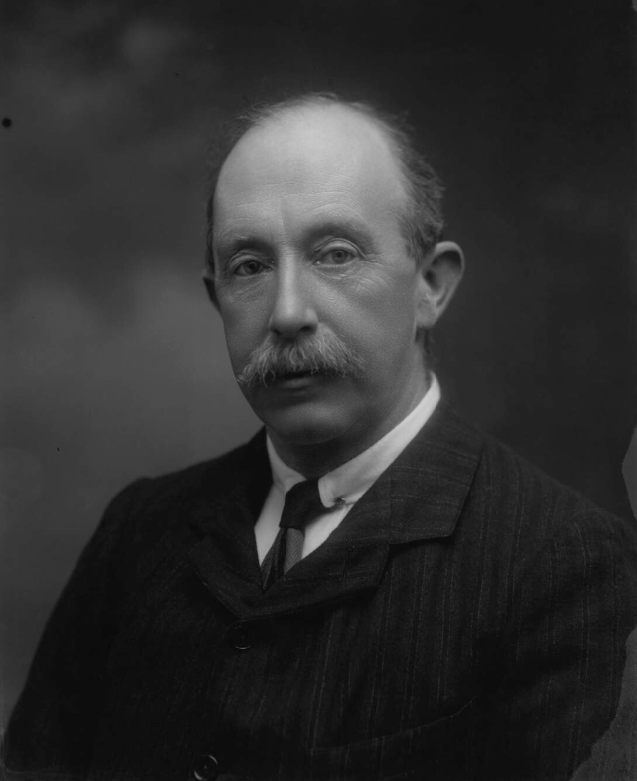
- William Heneage Legge – 1907

Vice-Chamberlain of the Household
- In office 27 June 1885 – 28 January 1886
- Monarch: Victoria
- Prime Minister: The Marquess of Salisbury
- Preceded by: Lord Charles Bruce
- Succeeded by: Viscount Kilcoursie
- In office 5 August 1886 – 24 November 1891
- Monarch: Victoria
- Prime Minister: The Marquess of Salisbury
- Preceded by: Viscount Kilcoursie
- Succeeded by: Lord Burghley

Personal details
- Born: 6 May 1851 Westminster, London
- Died: 11 March 1936 (aged 84) Patshull Hall, Staffordshire
- Party: Conservative
- Spouse: Lady Mary Coke (m. 1879; died 1929)
- Education: Christ Church, Oxford

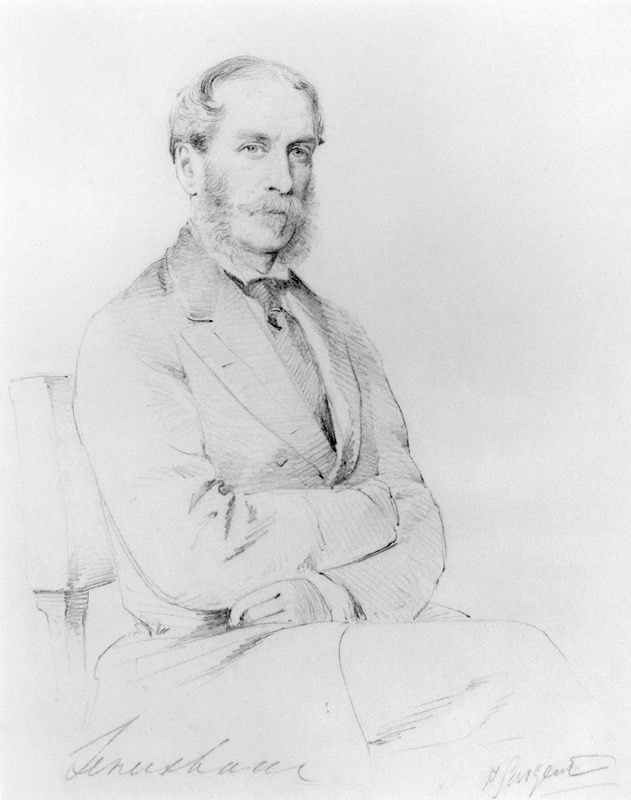

William Heneage Legge, 6th Earl of Dartmouth, GCVO, KCB, VD, TD, PC, JP (6 May 1851 – 11 March 1936), styled Viscount Lewisham between 1853 and 1891, was a British peer and Conservative politician. He served as Vice-Chamberlain of the Household between 1885 and 1886 and again between 1886 and 1891.

== Background and education ==
Born at Westminster, London, Dartmouth was the eldest son of William Legge, 5th Earl of Dartmouth, and Lady Augusta, daughter of Heneage Finch, 5th Earl of Aylesford. Sir Henry Legge was his younger brother. He was educated at Eton College and Christ Church, Oxford. On 7 May 1868, he was commissioned an ensign in the 27th Staffordshire Rifle Volunteer Corps, and was promoted from lieutenant to captain on 19 August 1874. Later promoted to major in the 1st Volunteer Battalion of the South Staffordshire Regiment, he resigned his commission on 20 December 1884.

He played first-class cricket for Marylebone Cricket Club in 1877, and was a county cricketer for Shropshire between 1869 and 1871, and for Staffordshire. He became one of the first vice-presidents of the Kent County Football Association in 1884.

== Political career ==
Legge entered Parliament in 1878 as Member of Parliament for West Kent, a seat he held until the constituency was split in 1885, when he was elected to the new constituency of Lewisham. The same year he was sworn of the Privy Council and made Vice-Chamberlain of the Household in Lord Salisbury's first administration. The Conservatives fell from power in January 1886 but returned to office under Salisbury already in July of the same year, when Dartmouth was once again appointed Vice-Chamberlain of the Household, a post he retained until 1891. He left the Commons in August 1891 on succeeding his father's titles.

In October of the same year he was also appointed Lord Lieutenant of Staffordshire (succeeding his father), which he remained until 1927. He was also an Alderman of the Staffordshire County Council and a justice of the peace for both Staffordshire and Shropshire. In July 1901 he was appointed an additional member of the Royal Commission on Historical Manuscripts.

Lord Dartmouth was honorary Colonel of the 5th volunteer battalion of the South Staffordshire Regiment from 1891, and of the 46th North Midland Divisional Train of the Royal Army Service Corps from 1908 to 1928, a period including the First World War, for which he was appointed a KCB in 1917. On his retirement, he was made a GCVO in the 1928 Birthday Honours. He was appointed Provincial Grand Master for the Masonic Province of Staffordshire 1919.

== Family ==
Lord Dartmouth married Lady Mary, fourth daughter of the Thomas Coke, 2nd Earl of Leicester, on 18 December 1879. They had five children:

- William Legge, Viscount Lewisham (1881–1958), later 7th Earl of Dartmouth.
- The Hon. Captain Gerald Legge (1882–1915), killed during the landing at Suvla Bay on 9 August 1915 whilst serving with the 7th Bn. South Staffordshire Regiment. He is commemorated on the Helles Memorial. He was a well-known ornithologist.
- Lady Dorothy Legge OBE (1883–1974), Justice of the Peace for Staffordshire, married Colonel Francis Meynell (grandson of Charles Wood, 1st Viscount Halifax).
- The Hon. Humphry Legge (1888–1962), later 8th Earl of Dartmouth.
- Lady Joan Margaret Legge (1885–1939), Justice of the Peace for Staffordshire, botanist, died in India.

The Countess of Dartmouth, who was made a CBE in 1920, died in December 1929. Lord Dartmouth survived her by seven years and died at Patshull Hall, Staffordshire, in March 1936, aged 84. He was succeeded in the earldom by his eldest son, William.

Parliament of the United Kingdom
Preceded by Sir Charles Mills, Bt; John Gilbert Talbot	Member of Parliament for West Kent; 1878–1885; With: Sir Charles Mills, Bt 1868–1885	Constituency split
New constituency	Member of Parliament for Lewisham; 1885–1891	Succeeded by John Penn
Political offices
Preceded by Lord Charles Bruce	Vice-Chamberlain of the Household; 1885–1886	Succeeded by Viscount Kilcoursie
Preceded by Viscount Kilcoursie	Vice-Chamberlain of the Household; 1886–1891	Succeeded by Lord Burghley
Honorary titles
Preceded by The Earl of Dartmouth	Lord Lieutenant of Staffordshire; 1891–1927	Succeeded by The Earl of Harrowby
Peerage of Great Britain
Preceded by William Legge	Earl of Dartmouth; 1891–1936	Succeeded by William Legge
