= 1903 Lewisham by-election =

By-election in the UK

← 1900	15 December 1903	1906 →

Candidate	Coates	Cleland
Party	Conservative	Liberal
Popular vote	7,709	5,697
Percentage	57.5%	42.5%
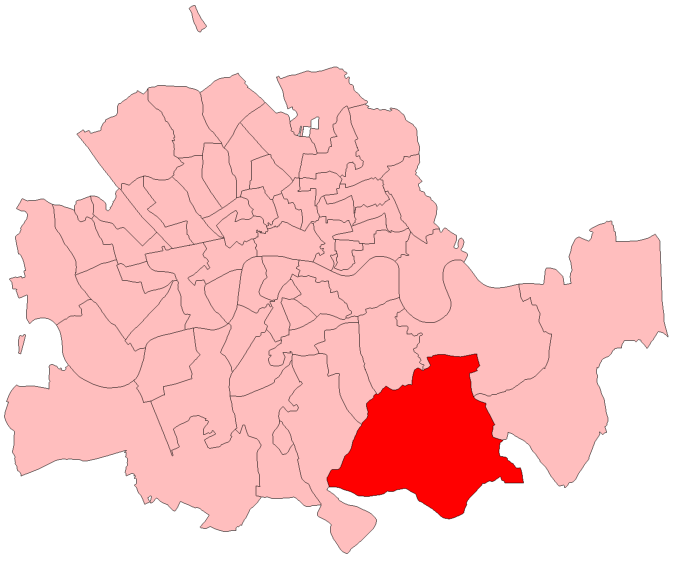
MP before election
John Penn
Conservative
Subsequent MP
Edward Coates
Conservative

The 1903 Lewisham by-election was a by-election held on 15 December 1903 for the British House of Commons constituency of Lewisham.

The by-election was triggered by the death of the serving Conservative Party Member of Parliament (MP), John Penn.

The Unionist candidate was Major Edward Coates. The Liberal Party candidate was James William Cleland.

As with the Dulwich by-election held on the same day, the main issue was tariff reform and Joseph Chamberlain's proposals for Imperial Preference. A factor which made the result of the by election difficult to predict was that the seat had not been contested since 1892 and in that time the population had doubled in size. The additional residents, according to the Times, were mainly "City men, with comparatively small incomes".

In the event, the result was a comfortable win for the Unionist candidate.

== Result ==
Lewisham by-election, 1903
Party	Candidate	Votes	%	±%
Conservative	Edward Coates	7,709	57.5	N/A
Liberal	James William Cleland	5,697	42.5	New
Majority		2,012	15.0	N/A
Turnout		13,406	71.7	N/A
Conservative hold		Swing		

== See also ==
- List of United Kingdom by-elections
- Lewisham constituency
