= Henry Brooke, Baron Brooke of Cumnor =

British politician (1903–1984)

The Right Honourable The Lord Brooke of Cumnor CH PC
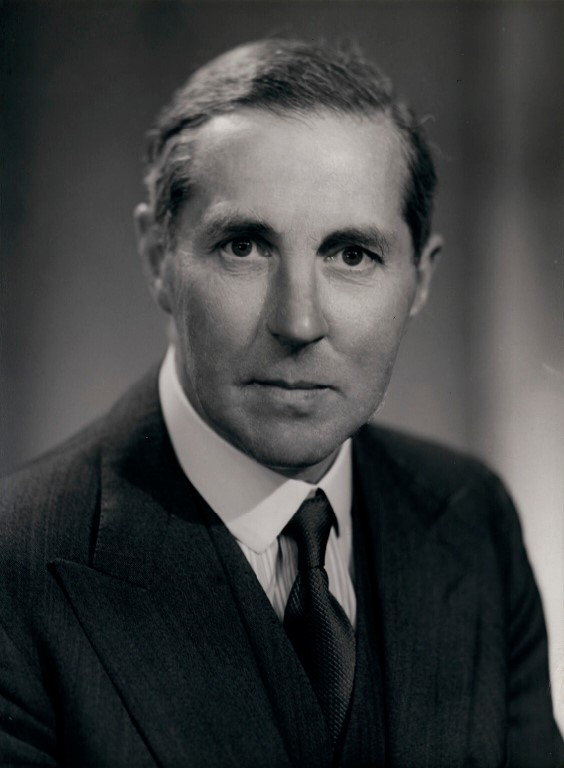
- Brooke in 1950

Shadow Home Secretary
- In office 16 October 1964 – 29 October 1964
- Leader: Alec Douglas-Home
- Preceded by: George Brown
- Succeeded by: Edward Boyle

Home Secretary
- In office 14 July 1962 – 16 October 1964
- Prime Minister: Harold Macmillan; Alec Douglas-Home
- Preceded by: Rab Butler
- Succeeded by: Frank Soskice

Chief Secretary to the Treasury
- In office 9 October 1961 – 14 July 1962
- Prime Minister: Harold Macmillan
- Preceded by: Office established
- Succeeded by: John Boyd-Carpenter

Minister of Housing, Local Government and Welsh Affairs
- In office 13 January 1957 – 9 October 1961
- Prime Minister: Harold Macmillan
- Preceded by: Duncan Sandys
- Succeeded by: Charles Hill

Financial Secretary to the Treasury
- In office 28 July 1954 – 13 January 1957
- Prime Minister: Winston Churchill; Anthony Eden
- Preceded by: John Boyd-Carpenter
- Succeeded by: Enoch Powell

Member of Parliament for Hampstead
- In office 23 February 1950 – 10 March 1966
- Preceded by: Charles Challen
- Succeeded by: Ben Whitaker

Member of Parliament for Lewisham West
- In office 24 November 1938 – 15 June 1945
- Preceded by: Philip Dawson
- Succeeded by: Arthur Skeffington

Personal details
- Born: 9 April 1903 Oxford, England
- Died: 29 March 1984 (aged 80) Mildenhall, Wiltshire, England
- Party: Conservative
- Spouse: The Baroness Brooke of Ystradfellte
- Education: Balliol College, Oxford

Henry Brooke, Baron Brooke of Cumnor, CH, PC (9 April 1903 – 29 March 1984) was a British Conservative Party politician who served as Chief Secretary to the Treasury and Paymaster General from 1961 to 1962 and — following the "Night of the Long Knives" — as Home Secretary from 1962 to 1964.

== Early life and education ==
Brooke was born in Oxford, the son of artist Leonard Leslie Brooke and Sybil Diana (née Brooke), daughter of Irish churchman Stopford Augustus Brooke. He was educated at Marlborough College, where he was a classmate of Rab Butler, and Balliol College, Oxford. He had an elder brother, 2nd Lt. Leonard Stopford Brooke, who was killed in Germany in 1918 while serving with the Army Cyclist Corps.

== Political career ==
After teaching philosophy at Balliol College for a year, Brooke worked at a Quaker settlement for the unemployed in the Rhondda Valley from 1927 to 1928. This experience led him to turn down the offer of a Fellowship in philosophy at Balliol in favour of a lifetime in politics. After a year on The Economist, Brooke became one of the original members, and subsequently Deputy Chairman, of the Conservative Research Department (1929–1937) under the chairmanship of Neville Chamberlain. The impetus for the pre-war "special areas" legislation was derived from his unsigned articles on "Places without a Future" which he wrote for The Times in 1934.

He was elected as a Conservative Member of Parliament (MP) for Lewisham West in a 1938 by-election. He spoke at the request of the Whips in support of Chamberlain in the debate of May 1940, just before the prime minister's fall from power, and Brooke himself was defeated in the 1945 general election. The next year he was elected to the London County Council, and served as Conservative leader on the council until 1951, continuing to serve on the Council and the Hampstead borough council until 1955. In 1949, he led the Conservative party on the London County Council to the brink of seizing power for only the third time in its history. From 1946 to 1948, he served as the final deputy chairman of the Southern Railway, before it was nationalised.

In 1952 during the British Malayan headhunting scandal, Brooke wrote to the Colonial Office concerning a concerned constituent that had shown him leaked photographs published by the Daily Worker depicting British troops in the Malayan Emergency posing with severed heads.

Brooke returned to parliament in 1950 as MP for Hampstead, and entered Winston Churchill's government in 1954 as Financial Secretary to the Treasury, serving under Rab Butler and Harold Macmillan when they were Chancellors of the Exchequer.

He continued in this job until 1957, when he became Minister of Housing and Local Government and Minister of Welsh Affairs in the Macmillan government, entering the Cabinet. In the former job, he was the main driving force behind making London a smokeless zone. He attracted controversy when steering the Rent Bill through Parliament after it had already secured a Second Reading in the House of Commons under his predecessors. In the latter job, he caused anger throughout Wales through his crucial support of Liverpool Council's bid to secure Westminster's approval of an Act of Parliament to flood Cwm Tryweryn in Meirionydd, thereby by-passing Welsh local authority opposition to the scheme. However, largely in response to the protests over Tryweryn, he subsequently attracted investment to Wales, including such projects as the Severn Bridge, the steelworks at Llanwern, and the Heads of the Valleys Road. In 1961 he became the first Chief Secretary to the Treasury in modern times.

In 1962, he reached his highest level in government, becoming Home Secretary following Harold Macmillan's "Night of the Long Knives" when many senior ministers were sacked. As Home Secretary, Brooke was not particularly successful, and his actions caused controversy on several occasions, including his response to the noisy demonstrations against the state visit by King Paul and Queen Frederica of Greece.

In his obituary in The Times, the author wrote: "His tenure of this difficult post was not a particularly happy one, and although his integrity and fairness were generally admired, there was a feeling in some quarters that he lacked the sensitiveness and flexibility required in the handling of difficult individual cases." In the Dictionary of National Biography, Lord Blake wrote that Brooke had to take a number of decisions in the field of immigration and deportation which infuriated libertarians, and that he seemed to display a certain insensitivity in these cases – an impression enhanced by his somewhat pedantic way of speech.

He was plunged into controversy at the very beginning of his term of office because of his initial reaction to the case of Carmen Bryan. Bryan was a 22-year-old Jamaican woman and first offender, who pleaded guilty to petty larceny (shoplifting goods worth £2) and was recommended for deportation by Paddington magistrates. Brooke's acquiescence to the court order and her six-week detention in Holloway Prison pending deportation was seen as both unnecessary and unjust. Neither bail nor the opportunity for her to appeal were offered directly to her. Standing firm, Brooke told the House of Commons, "I think it would be a great act of injustice if I were to stand in the way of her returning to Jamaica. I am not prepared to look at this case again". However, criticism in Parliament and in the media combined to force a speedy review where, four days later, Brooke recanted, freeing Bryan and allowing her to remain. Deportations for misdemeanours were subsequently suspended. There had been more than eighty recommendations for deportation in the seven weeks following the Conservative Government's introduction of the Commonwealth Immigrants Act (1962).

Brooke was one of many politicians to receive unprecedented criticism on That Was The Week That Was on BBC Television in 1962–63, which called him "the most hated man in Britain" and ended a mock profile of him with the phrase "If you're Home Secretary, you can get away with murder". He was also involved in the passage of various new anti-drug laws, including ones banning possession of amphetamines and the growing of cannabis. As the final arbiter in death penalty cases he was the last Home Secretary to allow death sentences to go ahead for the murder of John Alan West.

Sir Alec Douglas-Home kept Brooke in office as Home Secretary when he became Prime Minister in October 1963, and his last 12 months in office, which saw the introduction of the Police Act 1964 and the creation of a Royal Commission on Crime and Punishment, attracted much less controversy.

Brooke went into opposition following the Conservative defeat in 1964, and he lost his seat in the subsequent election in 1966. Having been appointed to the Order of the Companions of Honour as a Member (CH) in 1964, he was created a life peer as Baron Brooke of Cumnor, of Cumnor in the Royal County of Berks on 20 July 1966, and acted as a Conservative front bench spokesman in the House of Lords until 1970. The onset of Parkinson's disease then led him to retire gradually from public life.

== Personal life and family ==
Brooke married Barbara Muriel, daughter of the Reverend Alfred Mathews, in 1933. As she was made a life peer, too, they were one of the few couples who both held titles in their own right. The couple had four children:

- Peter Leonard Brooke (1934-2023), later The Lord Brooke of Sutton Mandeville, a Conservative politician.
- Sir Henry Brooke (1936–2018), a judge and Lord Justice of Appeal.
- Honor Leslie Brooke (b. 1941), married Thomas Nigel Miller.
- Margaret Hilary Diana Brooke (b. 1944), married James Pulfer.

Lord Brooke of Cumnor died from Parkinson's disease at his home in Mildenhall, Wiltshire, on 29 March 1984, aged 80.

== Notes ==
Parliament of the United Kingdom
Preceded by Philip Dawson	Member of Parliament for Lewisham West; 1938–1945	Succeeded by Arthur Skeffington
Preceded by Charles Challen	Member of Parliament for Hampstead; 1950–1966	Succeeded by Ben Whitaker
Political offices
Preceded by John Boyd-Carpenter	Financial Secretary to the Treasury; 1954–1957	Succeeded by Enoch Powell
Preceded by Sir Walter Monckton	Minister of Housing and Local Government and Welsh Affairs; 1957–1961	Succeeded by Charles Hill
New post	Chief Secretary to the Treasury; 1961–1962	Succeeded by John Boyd-Carpenter
Preceded by The Lord Mills	Paymaster General; 1961–1962	Succeeded by John Boyd-Carpenter
Preceded by Rab Butler	Secretary of State for the Home Department; 1962–1964	Succeeded by Sir Frank Soskice
Party political offices
Preceded by Harold Webbe as leader of the Municipal Reform Party on London County Council	Leader of the Conservative Party on London County Council; 1946–1952	Succeeded by Norris Kenyon
