= Henry Price (politician) =

British politician (1911–1982)

Henry Alfred Price, CBE (3 January 1911 – 4 December 1982) was a British company director and politician. He came from a working-class background but did well in the paper trade, where he set up his own business. He became a Conservative Party Member of Parliament, during which he founded an alliance to protect the middle class.

== Family origin ==
Price was the son of a builder's labourer and was born in London. He attended Hungerford Road School and Holloway County School but left at the age of 15 to join a paper manufacturer. Later, he set up his own business, Price, Topley and Company Ltd, who were paper merchants.

Price was married to Ivy May Trimer. They had a son and a daughter.

== Municipal life ==
He became an active member of the Conservative Party and, in 1944, he was co-opted as a member of Lewisham Borough Council, elections having been suspended for the duration of the Second World War. He enjoyed municipal life and, in 1946, he was chosen as Conservative candidate for Lewisham West for the London County Council. He was elected by 578 votes. This gave Price a prominent role in London-wide Conservative politics. After boundary changes, Price was re-elected in 1949.

== Parliament ==
At the 1950 general election, Price was chosen as Conservative candidate for Lewisham West. He gained the seat from Arthur Skeffington, who had held it as a Labour MP. His maiden speech on 22 May dwelt on the subject of high housing rents; he urged that the period for repayment of public works loans be lengthened from 60 to 80 years. Fighting for re-election in 1951, Price reported that his audiences were "flabbergasted" to learn the high level of spending by the Labour government.

== Advancement ==
After his re-election, Price was appointed Parliamentary Private Secretary to Geoffrey Lloyd. In September 1952, he volunteered to spend a week with trainee miners in the Kemball Training Centre, near Stoke-on-Trent. Afterwards he was critical of the sleeping arrangements in the miners' hostel. He was chosen to second the "Loyal Address" after the Queen's Speech, traditionally a role given to rising MPs on the government backbenches.

Price was critical of the facilities available to MPs, claiming to work over 100 hours a week but that his pay amounted to 2s per hour; he said that MPs were "treated like grubby office boys". He was a member of a Parliamentary delegation to NATO in 1954. Price was involved in organising the presentation to Winston Churchill of a portrait by Graham Sutherland to mark his eightieth birthday; this gift backfired as Churchill hated the portrait and his wife had it burnt.

== Middle Class Alliance ==
In December 1954, it was announced that the London County Council would be seeking a Compulsory purchase order for Price's home in Forest Hill for a new housing scheme. Price was critical of the way trade unions operated, claiming in a speech in February 1956 that a majority of workers in the country were forcing inefficient working methods on management. In April that year, he had the idea for forming a "Middle Class Alliance", which was quickly established. He declared the aim of the Alliance was not selfish but "to preserve the middle classes for the service of the nation".

Price's term as Chairman of the Alliance came to an abrupt end in early 1957 when he offered his resignation after a split; two executive members who were supporters of the Liberal Party had been planning a breakaway. On 18 March, the Alliance was formally dissolved. He spent a great deal of time in the late 1950s opposing the Rent Act 1957.

== Retirement ==
"Indifferent health" forced Price to announce in July 1961 that he would not be a candidate at the next general election. He was appointed a Commander of the Order of the British Empire in 1962. Late in his Parliamentary career, he attempted to amend the London Government Bill to stop the merger of Lewisham with Deptford to create the London Borough of Lewisham. He rebelled against the whip on the abolition of resale price maintenance in 1964.

He became managing director of Grove Paper Company Ltd. after leaving Parliament in 1964.

== Sources ==
- M. Stenton and S. Lees, "Who's Who of British MPs" Vol. IV (Harvester Press, 1981)
- "Who Was Who", A & C Black

Parliament of the United Kingdom
Preceded by Arthur Skeffington	Member of Parliament for Lewisham West; 1950–1964	Succeeded by Patrick McNair-Wilson
