= 1977 City of London and Westminster South by-election =

UK parliamentary by-election

The 1977 City of London and Westminster South by-election on 24 February 1977 was held after Conservative Member of Parliament (MP) Christopher Tugendhat resigned the seat upon his appointment to the European Commission. A safe Conservative seat, it was won by their candidate, Peter Brooke.

== Candidates ==
The election was contested by a record ten candidates, beating the nine who had contested the 1976 Walsall North by-election. This total was topped at the 1978 Lambeth Central by-election. The candidates were:

- Bill Boaks stood under the title "Air, Road, Public Safety, White Resident". Boaks was a road safety campaigner and serial by-election candidate.
- Peter Brooke, a graduate of Harvard Business School was the Conservative Party candidate.
- Dennis Delderfield was the candidate for the New Britain Party, of which he was founder and leader. Delderfield was also a common councilman of the Corporation of London.
- Ralph Herbert was an independent who stood under the title "Christ, Crown, Country, Commonwealth, Christian Constitution".
- Paul Kavanagh was the candidate for the National Front.
- Michael Lobb was the candidate for the National Party, a splinter group of the National Front. He was candidate for the National Front in Newham South in the February 1974 general election and the subsequent by-election in the same seat.
- Peter Mitchell stood under the banner "Pro-Homosexual Civil Rights". He was involved in the Campaign for Homosexual Equality pressure group.
- Malcolm Noble was the Labour Party candidate.
- Angus Scrimgeour was the Liberal Party candidate.
- William Thompson was an independent who stood under the title "Christian Outreach to Britain, Anti-Pornography".

== Aftermath ==
Brooke would retain the seat at the 1979 general election, and hold it until his retirement at the 2001 general election (it reverted to its former name of Cities of London and Westminster in 1997). He held a number of front-bench Government posts during his tenure, including Secretary of State for Northern Ireland.

== Result ==
City of London and Westminster South by-election, 1977
Party	Candidate	Votes	%	±%
Conservative	Peter Brooke	11,962	59.07	+7.35
Labour	Malcolm Noble	3,997	19.74	−11.21
Liberal	Angus Scrimgeour	1,981	9.78	−5.07
National Front	Paul Kavanagh	1,051	5.19	+2.72
Pro-Homosexual Civil Rights	Peter Mitchel	449	2.22	New
National Party	Michael Lobb	364	1.80	New
New Britain	Dennis Delderfield	306	1.51	New
Air, Road, Public Safety, White Resident	Bill Boaks	61	0.30	New
Christian Outreach to Britain, Anti-Pornography	William Thompson	43	0.21	New
Christ, Crown, Country, Commonwealth, Christian Constitution	Ralph Herbert	37	0.18	New
Majority		7,965	39.33	+18.56
Turnout		20,251	39.60	−13.60
Conservative hold		Swing	+9.28	

The result for the previous election was:

General election October 1974: City of London and Westminster South
Party	Candidate	Votes	%	±%
Conservative	Christopher Tugendhat	14,350	51.7	−1.5
Labour	Phil Turner	8,589	30.9	+3.5
Liberal	T. G. Underwood	4,122	14.9	−4.0
National Front	D. Baxter	686	2.5	New
Majority		5,761	20.8	−5.1
Turnout		27,747	53.2	−8.2
Registered electors		52,170		
Conservative hold		Swing	-2.5	

== See also ==
- United Kingdom by-election records
