= Patrick McNair-Wilson =

British politician (1929–2025)

Sir Patrick McNair-Wilson

Member of Parliament for New Forest
- In office 7 November 1968 – 8 April 1997
- Preceded by: Oliver Crosthwaite-Eyre
- Succeeded by: constituency abolished

Member of Parliament for Lewisham West
- In office 15 October 1964 – 10 March 1966
- Preceded by: Henry Price
- Succeeded by: James Dickens

Personal details
- Born: 28 May 1929 Camden, London, England
- Died: 4 December 2025 (aged 96) Sway, Hampshire, England
- Party: Conservative
- Spouse: Diana Methuen-Campbell (m. 1953; died 2015)
- Children: 5
- Relatives: Michael McNair-Wilson (brother); Laura Farris (niece)
- Military career
- Allegiance: United Kingdom
- Service years: 1947–1952
- Unit: Coldstream Guards

Sir Patrick Michael Ernest David McNair-Wilson (28 May 1929 – 4 December 2025) was a British Conservative Member of Parliament and consultant.

== Early life and career ==
McNair-Wilson was born in Camden, London on 28 May 1929, the son of Robert McNair-Wilson and Winifred Paynter, He was educated at Eton College and was commissioned in the Coldstream Guards from 1947 to 1952, serving in Palestine and North Africa. From 1951 to 1953, he was an executive at the French Shipping Company.

He joined the staff of Conservative Central Office in 1954, working for them until 1958. He became a director of the London Municipal Society in 1961, remaining in the role until 1963. In the same period, he was editor of The Londoner. He was also a broadcaster.

McNair-Wilson was the member of parliament for Lewisham West from 1964 until he lost the seat to Labour in 1966. He then won the 1968 by-election in the New Forest constituency, representing this safe Conservative seat until his retirement in 1997.

== Personal life and death ==
His younger brother Sir Michael McNair-Wilson and his niece Laura Farris both served as an MP for Newbury in separate terms.

In 1953, McNair-Wilson married Diana Evelyn Kitty Campbell Methuen-Campbell, the daughter of the Hon. Laurence Methuen-Campbell. She died in 2015. The couple had five children. McNair-Wilson's recreations were sailing, pottery and flying. He lived on a farm in Beaulieu, Hampshire.

McNair-Wilson died at a care home in Sway, Hampshire, on 4 December 2025, at the age of 96.

== Honours ==
McNair-Wilson was awarded a knighthood in the 1989 Birthday Honours for political service.

== Sources ==
- The Times Guide to the House of Commons, Times Newspapers Ltd, 1966, 1997
- Leigh Rayment's Peerage Pages

Parliament of the United Kingdom
| Preceded by Henry Price | Member of Parliament for Lewisham West; 1964–1966 | Succeeded by James Dickens |
| Preceded by Oliver Crosthwaite-Eyre | Member of Parliament for New Forest; 1968–1997 | Constituency abolished |
