= 1968 New Forest by-election =

UK Parliamentary by-election

The 1968 New Forest by-election of 7 November 1968 was held after Conservative Member of Parliament (MP) Oliver Crosthwaite-Eyre, resigned from the House of Commons due to ill health. The seat was retained by the Conservatives.

== Result ==
New Forest, by-election 1968
Party	Candidate	Votes	%	±%
Conservative	Patrick McNair-Wilson	28,025	66.27	+15.07
Liberal	Nicholas Locock	8,430	19.93	−2.12
Labour	Alan Reynard	5,836	13.80	−12.95
Majority		19,595	46.34	+21.89
Turnout		42,291		
Conservative hold		Swing		

== Previous election ==
General election 1966: New Forest
Party	Candidate	Votes	%	±%
Conservative	Oliver Crosthwaite-Eyre	27,292	51.20	
Labour	MH Jones	14,260	26.75	
Liberal	Nicholas Locock	11,757	22.05	
Majority		13,032	24.45	
Turnout		53,309	74.16	
Conservative hold		Swing		
