= Family mediation =

Dispute resolution method

Family mediation is a member of the ADR or alternative dispute resolution family. It forms one of the core pillars of mediation services provided globally.

Historically, it remains unclear where family mediation first evolved geographically. However, family mediation has been present in various forms in various cultures world-wide for thousands of years.

The family-mediation system focuses on providing a dispute-resolution mechanism to families who are in dispute. Divorce mediation forms part of the family mediation tree of services.

There are two main fields of modern day family mediation - mediation and co-mediation. In the former of the two fields a single mediator works with the family in dispute. In the latter of the two fields, two or more mediators work with a family in dispute. Mediations are completed by the use of either joint or single caucuses. In single caucuses the mediator/s caucus one party at a time. In joint caucuses the mediator/s work with all sides to the dispute present in the same session. The majority of family disputes have two sides - however, in family disputes between siblings it is not uncommon for several parties to become involved.

== The family mediation process ==
Family mediation is based on the same principles that apply in mediation generally;-

- Voluntariness
- Transparency
- Mutual Respect

Family mediation is non-confrontational in nature and progressive. It encourages parties to focus on the future and problem solving strategies rather than the problems of the past. The process is also "child centered" whereby the parties are encouraged to make special provision for the needs of children where the subject parties of such mediations have childcare related issues.

== Family mediation worldwide ==
Family mediation has evolved in both a public and private capacity worldwide in a number of countries. Organizations exist in the United States, The United Kingdom, Australia, New Zealand, Italy and Canada.

In some jurisdictions the state or government fund or financially assist family mediation services.

== See also ==
- Family mediation in Germany
