= James William Cleland =

James William Cleland

James William Cleland (1874 – 21 October 1914) was a Scottish Liberal Party politician and Barrister.

== Background ==
He was born in Glasgow in 1874, the son of Charles Cleland, a manufacturer. He was educated at The Glasgow Academy before moving south to complete his education at Balliol College, Oxford, where he graduated with honours in the School of Jurisprudence. In 1897, whilst at University he became President of the Oxford Union.

== Career ==
In 1899 he was called to the Bar at Middle Temple in London. He returned to his native Glasgow to contest the 1900 General Election as Liberal candidate for Bridgeton, but was unsuccessful;

General election 1900: Glasgow Bridgeton
Party	Candidate	Votes	%	±%
Conservative	Charles Dickson	5,032		
Liberal	James William Cleland	4,041		
Majority				
Turnout				
Conservative hold		Swing		

He returned to London and soon became active in politics in London and in 1901 he was elected to the London County Council for the Liberal backed Progressive Party, representing Lewisham. As part of the ruling administration, he was appointed Chairman of Parks and Establishment Committees. In 1903 he stood for parliament as Liberal candidate at the Lewisham by-election, finishing second;

Lewisham by-election, 1903
Party	Candidate	Votes	%	±%
Conservative	Edward Coates	7,709		
Liberal	James William Cleland	5,697		
Majority		2,012		
Turnout		12,406		
Conservative hold		Swing		

After this unsuccessful attempt, he was re-elected in 1904 to the London County Council, again for Lewisham. In 1906 he again returned to his native Glasgow to contest the 1906 General Election as Liberal candidate for Bridgeton and was elected;

General election 1906: Glasgow Bridgeton
Party	Candidate	Votes	%	±%
Liberal	James William Cleland	5,585	58.2	
Conservative	Charles Dickson	4,019	41.8	
Majority				
Turnout				
Liberal gain from Conservative		Swing		

In 1907 he did not seek re-election to the London County Council so that he could concentrate on his parliamentary duties. After one full parliamentary term, he sought re-election and was successful;

General election Jan 1910: Glasgow Bridgeton
Party	Candidate	Votes	%	±%
Liberal	James William Cleland	5,336		
Conservative	Patrick Keith Lang	3,539		
Majority				
Turnout				
Liberal hold		Swing		

He chose not to defend his seat at the December 1910 General Election and did not stand for parliament again.

He remained single throughout his life and died in 1914 at the age of 40.

== Sources ==
Who's Who; http://www.ukwhoswho.com

Parliament of the United Kingdom
Preceded by Charles Dickson	Member of Parliament for Glasgow Bridgeton; 1906–December 1910	Succeeded by MacCallum Scott
