= 1891 Lewisham by-election =

UK parliamentary by-election

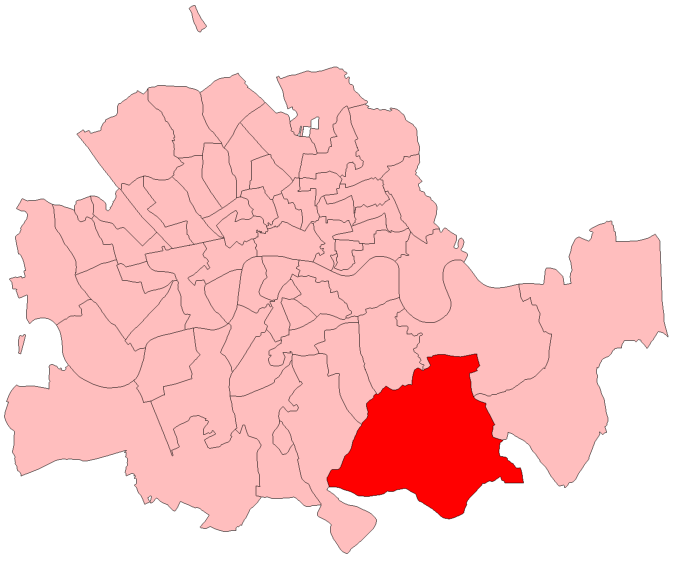
Lewisham in London

The 1891 Lewisham by-election was a by-election held on 26 August 1891 for the British House of Commons constituency of Lewisham.

The by-election was triggered by the elevation to the peerage of the serving Conservative Party Member of Parliament (MP), Viscount Lewisham on the death of his father.

== Candidates ==
The Unionist candidate was John Penn. The Liberal Party candidate was George Septimus Warmington.

Penn, who was treasurer of the Royal Kent Dispensary and president of the Lee, Lewisham and Blackheath Horticultural Society, was head of his family's marine engineering firm in nearby Greenwich and as such was a major local employer. In his election address, he stated that he was a loyal supporter of Lord Salisbury's government and praised their policies in Ireland, which he said had brought a reduction in rural crime and poverty, and declared himself in favour of restrictions on immigration and for improvements to the Thames. He was supported by the Liberal Unionist Party. Warmington, a solicitor, was a resident of the area for over 20 years, a vestryman and Poor Law guardian and deacon of the Burnt Ash Congregational Church.

== Issues in the campaign ==
The major questions that arose in the course of the campaign were Irish Home Rule, free education, and labour questions. Mr V Clayton of the Liberal Unionists, spoke widely in the constituency against what he saw as the 'specious literature' from the Home Rule side. His talks were accompanied by magic lantern slides showing 'the houghing of cattle and the pouring of pitch upon the heads of unhappy constables'. Penn had to contend with allegations from the Liberals that he paid his workers inadequate wages.

One issue that arose in the course of the campaign was that of temperance, and proposals to close public houses on Sundays. Penn told a deputation of temperance supporters that he could not support them. The deputation issued an appeal to temperance voters to vote for Warmington; his nomination was later officially seconded by the Temperance party. Penn later told a deputation from the Blackheath Licensed Victuallers and Beerseller's Protection Society that he was in favour of compensation being given to any publican who was forced to close on Sundays. The Society, believed to influence about a thousand votes, pledged him their support.

Two unknown factors in the by-election were the number of new voters on the register - around 2,400 since the last general election - and the number of voters who were expected to be away on holiday at the time, estimated at 500 to 1,000, a circumstance which was thought likely to favour the Liberals. Special trains were laid on to ferry working class voters to the constituency on the day.

== Polling ==
On polling day, one feature which attracted attention was the arrival of a number of fire engines from Merryweather & Sons, sent to ferry Conservative voters to the polls. The Conservatives also had a St Bernard dog carrying a motto, "Vote for Penn, and don't you forget it." The Liberals paraded "Mr Balfour's maiden", a battering-ram of the type used in evictions in Ireland under the authority of the Chief Secretary of Ireland, Arthur Balfour.

The result, announced just after midnight, was a win for the Conservative candidate, with a slightly reduced majority from the preceding general election five years earlier.

== Result ==
Lewisham by-election, 1891
Party	Candidate	Votes	%	±%
Conservative	John Penn	4,585	61.3	−8.2
Liberal	George Septimus Warmington	2,892	38.7	+8.2
Majority		1,693	22.6	−16.4
Turnout		7,477	64.2	+4.6
Conservative hold		Swing	-8.2	

== See also ==
- List of United Kingdom by-elections
- Lewisham constituency
