= Lewisham (London County Council constituency) =

London County Council constituency

- Former constituency for the London County Council

Former constituency
- Created: 1889
- Abolished: 1919
- Member(s): 2
- Replaced by: Lewisham East and Lewisham West

Lewisham was a constituency used for elections to the London County Council between 1889 and 1919. The seat shared boundaries with the UK Parliament constituency of the same name.

== Councillors ==
Year	Name	Party	Name	Party
1889	Franc Sadleir Brereton	Moderate	William George Lemon	Progressive
1892	George Alfred Harvey	Progressive	William George Lemon	Progressive
1895	Theophilus William Williams	Moderate	Alexander Wilson	Moderate
1898	Theophilus William Williams	Moderate	George Edward Dodson	Moderate
1901	James William Cleland	Progressive	George Edward Dodson	Moderate
1904	James William Cleland	Progressive	Arthur Stanley	Progressive
1907	William Legge	Municipal Reform	Assheton Pownall	Municipal Reform
1910	Frederick Houston Carter	Municipal Reform	James Stanhope	Municipal Reform
1913	Frederick Houston Carter	Municipal Reform	Carlyon Bellairs	Municipal Reform
1915	Frederick Houston Carter	Municipal Reform	William Henry Le May	Municipal Reform
1916	Frederick Houston Carter	Municipal Reform	Robert Jackson	Municipal Reform
1918	Richard Owen Roberts	Municipal Reform	Robert Jackson	Municipal Reform

== Election results ==
1889 London County Council election: Lewisham
Party	Candidate	Votes	%	±%
Progressive	William George Lemon	2,351		
Moderate	Franc Sadleir Brereton	2,127		
Moderate	Arthur Poyser	1,889		
Progressive	Charles Conybeare	1,512		
Progressive win (new seat)				
Moderate win (new seat)				

1892 London County Council election: Lewisham
Party	Candidate	Votes	%	±%
Progressive	George Alfred Harvey	2,694		
Progressive	William George Lemon	2,405		
Moderate	John Lindsey	2,049		
Moderate	Frederick Crockford	2,038		
Progressive hold		Swing		
Progressive gain from Moderate		Swing		

1895 London County Council election: Lewisham
Party	Candidate	Votes	%	±%
Moderate	Alexander Wilson	3,820		
Moderate	Theophilus William Williams	3,802		
Progressive	W. Willis	2,806		
Progressive	G. S. Warmington	2,728		
Moderate gain from Progressive		Swing		
Moderate gain from Progressive		Swing		

1898 London County Council election: Lewisham
Party	Candidate	Votes	%	±%
Moderate	George Edward Dodson	4,061		
Moderate	Theophilus William Williams	4,025		
Progressive	J. E. Williams	3,037		
Progressive	A. C. Williams	3,021		
Moderate hold		Swing		
Moderate hold		Swing		

1901 London County Council election: Lewisham
Party	Candidate	Votes	%	±%
Progressive	James William Cleland	4,370	40.8	+13.5
Conservative	George Edward Dodson	3,235	30.2	−6.3
Conservative	Theophilus William Williams	3,096	28.9	−7.3
Conservative hold		Swing		
Progressive gain from Conservative		Swing	+10.2	

1904 London County Council election: Lewisham
Party	Candidate	Votes	%	±%
Progressive	James William Cleland	6,297		
Progressive	Arthur Stanley	5,946		
Conservative	J. Vesey FitzGerald	4,557		
Conservative	E. L. Hartley	4,446		
Majority				
Progressive hold		Swing		

1907 London County Council election: Lewisham
Party	Candidate	Votes	%	±%
Municipal Reform	William Legge	11,028		
Municipal Reform	Assheton Pownall	10,818		
Progressive	James William Cleland	7,004		
Progressive	Neil Primrose	6,893		
Labour	Gee	118		
Majority				
Municipal Reform gain from Progressive		Swing		
Municipal Reform gain from Progressive		Swing		

1910 London County Council election: Lewisham
Party	Candidate	Votes	%	±%
Municipal Reform	James Stanhope	9,031		
Municipal Reform	Frederick Houston Carter	8,958		
Progressive	Arthur Robert Gridley	4,950		
Progressive	Gee	2,297		
Majority				
Municipal Reform hold		Swing		

1913 London County Council election: Lewisham
Party	Candidate	Votes	%	±%
Municipal Reform	Frederick Houston Carter	9,497	31.1	−4.7
Municipal Reform	Carlyon Bellairs	9,410	30.8	−4.7
Progressive	Charles Garfitt	5,865	19.2	−0.4
Progressive	J S Lewis	5,809	19.0	+9.9
Majority		3,545	11.6	−4.3
Municipal Reform hold		Swing	-2.2	
Municipal Reform hold		Swing	-7.3	
