= Frank Raffety =

British politician (1875–1946)

Frank Walter Raffety

Frank Walter Raffety OBE (1875 – 8 September 1946) was a British barrister and Liberal Party politician.

He was the son of Charles Walter Raffety, of High Wycombe, Buckinghamshire and attended the Royal Grammar School, High Wycombe. In 1898 he was called to the bar at the Middle Temple, and practised on the Northern Circuit.

He developed an interest in politics, and became honorary secretary of the Social and Political Education League. The organisation was established to provide political education to the general public, and in particular to promote moderation over revolution. He was also an active member of the Eighty Club, an educational group within the Liberal Party.

He was selected as Liberal prospective parliamentary candidate for Stamford for a general election expected to take place in 1915.

He unsuccessfully contested the Lewisham West by-election in September 1921;

Lewisham West by-election, 1921
Party	Candidate	Votes	%	±%
Unionist	Philip Dawson	9,427	38.9	n/a
Anti-Waste League	Walter George Windham	8,580	35.4	n/a
Liberal	Frank Raffety	6,211	25.6	n/a
Majority		847	3.5	n/a
Turnout		24,218	59.2	n/a
Unionist hold		Swing	n/a	

In March of the following year he was elected to the London County Council, as a (Liberal-backed) Progressive Party councillor for Islington West;

1922 London County Council election: Islington West
Party	Candidate	Votes	%	±%
Progressive	Henry Mills	5,903	33.6	
Progressive	Frank Raffety	5,746	32.7	
Labour	P.H. Black	3,013	17.2	
Labour	G. Davison	2,894	16.5	
Majority		2,733	15.5	
Progressive hold		Swing		

At the general election in November 1922 he failed to win Bristol West;

General election 1922: Bristol West
Party	Candidate	Votes	%	±%
Unionist	George Gibbs	18,124	62.0	n/a
Liberal	Frank Raffety	11,100	38.0	n/a
Majority		7,024	24.0	n/a
Unionist hold		Swing	n/a	

A further general election was held in 1923, and Raffety was elected Liberal Member of Parliament (MP) for Bath;

General election 1923: Bath
Party	Candidate	Votes	%	±%
Liberal	Frank Raffety	13,694	51.6	+19.6
Unionist	Charles Foxcroft	12,830	48.4	−1.8
Majority		864	3.2	21.4
Turnout			79.1	−3.3
Liberal gain from Unionist		Swing	+10.7	

His membership of the Commons was brief, as he was defeated when a further general election was called in 1924;

General election 1924: Bath
Party	Candidate	Votes	%	±%
Unionist	Charles Foxcroft	16,067	55.8	+7.4
Liberal	Frank Raffety	8,800	30.6	−21.0
Labour	Walter Barton Scobell	3,914	13.6	+13.6
Majority		7,267	25.2	28.4
Turnout			84.5	+5.4
Unionist gain from Liberal		Swing	+14.2	

He again stood as a Liberal candidate at Cheltenham in 1929;

General election 1929: Cheltenham
Party	Candidate	Votes	%	±%
Unionist	Walter Preston	15,279	53.2	+3.7
Liberal	Frank Raffety	8,533	29.7	−2.0
Labour	William Ramsey Piggott	4,920	17.1	−1.7
Majority		6,746	23.5	+5.7
Turnout			79.8	−0.5
Unionist hold		Swing	+2.8	

and East Dorset in 1935, but failed to be elected;

General election 1935: Dorset East
Party	Candidate	Votes	%	±%
Conservative	Gordon Hall Caine	25,520	53.5	+9.0
Liberal	Frank Raffety	11,349	23.8	−16.6
Labour	Edward Joseph Stocker	10,823	22.7	+14.6
Majority		14,171	29.7	+25.6
Turnout		47,692	74.4	
Conservative hold		Swing	+12.8	

Raffety remained active in Liberal party politics, as a speaker. He became the Chairman of the Industrial Co-Partnership Association. In 1943 he was granted the freedom of the borough of High Wycombe, of which he had been honorary recorder since 1905. In 1945 he was made an Officer of the Order of British Empire.

He died at his home in Bramley, Surrey in August 1946, aged 71.

Parliament of the United Kingdom
Preceded by Charles Foxcroft	Member of Parliament for Bath; 1923–1924	Succeeded by Charles Foxcroft
