= Henry Brooke (judge) =

British judge

Sir Henry Brooke CMG (19 July 1936 – 30 January 2018) was a British judge. He became a Lord Justice of Appeal in 1996, and became vice-president of the Civil Division of the Court of Appeal of England and Wales in 2003. He retired from judicial office on 30 September 2006.

== Early life ==
Brooke was the son of Henry Brooke, Baron Brooke of Cumnor, a former Home Secretary, and Barbara Brooke, Baroness Brooke of Ystradfellte. His parents were one of the few married couples where both partners held noble titles in their own right. His elder brother was Peter Brooke, Baron Brooke of Sutton Mandeville and he also had two younger sisters; Honor Miller and Margaret Pulfer.

Brooke was educated at Marlborough College (1949–54) and undertook national service in the Royal Engineers (1955–57). He then studied Mods and Greats (classical language and literature, and ancient history and philosophy) at Balliol College, Oxford (1957–61).

== Legal career ==
He was called to the Bar by the Inner Temple in 1963, and was Junior Counsel to the Crown (Common Law) from 1978 to 1981. He became a Queen's Counsel in 1981, and was a Recorder from 1983 to 1988. He was Counsel to the Sizewell B Nuclear Power Station Inquiry in 1983–85, and one of the DTI Inspectors into the 1985 takeover of Harrods by the Al Fayed brothers (1987-88).

He practised at Fountain Court Chambers until he was appointed as a High Court Judge assigned to the Queen's Bench Division in 1988, and received the customary knighthood. He was chairman of the Law Commission from 1993 to 1995, and was promoted to become a Lord Justice of Appeal in 1996. He was the judge in charge of the modernisation of the English law courts from 2001 to 2004. He was vice-president of the Court of Appeal's Civil Division from 2003 to 2006.

He was President of the Society for Computers and Law for nine years, and was a major player in the formation of the British and Irish Legal Information Institute (BAILII), of which he was the chairman of trustees between 2000 and 2011. He became General Editor of The White Book (Civil Procedure Rules) between 2004 and 2007, and was a trustee of the Wordsworth Trust until 2001, when became a Fellow.

Following his retirement from the Bench in September 2006 he practised as a civil mediator for eight years and was Chairman of the Civil Mediation Council between 2007 and 2011. He is the Emeritus President of the Slynn Foundation, and a patron of nine charities in the legal field, including the Public Law Project, the Prisoners of Conscience Appeal Fund, Prisoners Abroad, Law for Life and the Harrow Law Centre.

== Honours ==
Brooke was appointed Companion of the Order of St Michael and St George (CMG) in the 2012 Birthday Honours for services to justice reform in Albania. In 2013 he was elected an Honorary Fellow of Balliol College, Oxford. In 2017 he became a Knight of the Order of Skanderbeg, Albania's highest honour for a non-citizen.

== Personal life ==
Brooke was married to Bridget Kalaugher in 1966. They had four children; Michael, Nick, Christopher and Caroline. He died on 30 January 2018 following cardiac surgery.
