= Barbara Brooke, Baroness Brooke of Ystradfellte =

British politician (1908-2000)

The Right Honourable The Baroness Brooke of Ystradfellte DBE

Member of the House of Lords
- Lord Temporal
- Life peerage 7 December 1964 – 1 September 2000

Personal details
- Born: Barbara Muriel Mathews; 14 January 1908
- Died: 1 September 2000 (aged 92)
- Party: Conservative
- Spouse: Henry Brooke (m. 1933; died 1984)
- Children: 4
- Education: Queen Anne's School

Barbara Muriel Brooke, Baroness Brooke of Ystradfellte DBE (née Mathews; 14 January 1908 – 1 September 2000) was a British Conservative Party politician.

== Personal life ==
Baroness Brooke was the youngest of five children of a Welsh minister, Rev. Alfred Augustus Mathews, and his wife, Ethel Frances. She was educated at Queen Anne's School in Caversham, Berkshire and the Gloucester Training College of Domestic Science.

On 22 April 1933, she married fellow Conservative, Henry Brooke; the couple had four children:

- Peter Leonard Brooke (1934–2023), later The Lord Brooke of Sutton Mandeville, a Conservative politician.
- Sir Henry Brooke (1936–2018), a judge and Lord Justice of Appeal.
- Honor Leslie Brooke (born 1941), married Thomas Nigel Miller.
- Margaret Hilary Diana Brooke (born 1944), married James Pulfer.

== Career ==
After having started a family, Brooke entered politics in 1948, when she became a member of Hampstead Council, a seat she held until 1965; she also was a Joint Vice-chairman of the Conservative Party from 1954 to 1964. She had also been active in a number of health organisations in her lifetime, including being a member of the North West Metropolitan Regional Hospital Board from 1954 to 1966, chair of The Queen's Institute of District Nursing from 1961 to 1971 and the North London Hospital Management Committee from 1963 to 1966.

== Honours ==
In the 1960 New Year Honours, Brooke was appointed to the Order of the British Empire as a Dame Commander (DBE), for "political and public services". In 1964, she was raised to the peerage as Baroness Brooke of Ystradfellte, of Ystradfellte in the County of Brecknock and two years later her husband was created Baron Brooke of Cumnor.
