= James Dickens =

British politician (1931–2013)

James McCulloch York Dickens OBE (4 April 1931 – 5 April 2013) was a British Labour Party politician.

Dickens was born in a Glasgow tenement. He attended Shawlands Academy and left aged 14, completing his education later at Newbattle Abbey College and Ruskin and St Catherine's Colleges, Oxford.

Dickens served on Westminster Borough Council representing Millbank Ward from 1962 to 1965. Having unsuccessfully fought Chelsea in 1964, he was the Member of Parliament (MP) for the marginal constituency of Lewisham West from 1966 to 1970. He was a member of the Tribune Group of left-wing MPs. His seat was gained by the Conservative candidate John Gummer.

After leaving Parliament, he became Assistant Director of Manpower for the National Freight Corporation. He subsequently joined the National Water Council as Assistant Director of Manpower and was promoted to Director of Manpower. From 1983 to 1991 he worked as Chief Personnel Officer to the Agricultural and Food Research Council. He left the Labour Party in 2003, because of opposition to the Iraq War.

Dickens was made an Officer of the Order of the British Empire in the Queen's Birthday Honours list of 1991.

Parliament of the United Kingdom
Preceded by Patrick McNair-Wilson	Member of Parliament for Lewisham West; 1966–1970	Succeeded by John Gummer
