= Peter Brooke, Baron Brooke of Sutton Mandeville =

British politician (1934–2023)

The Right Honourable The Lord Brooke of Sutton Mandeville CH PC
- Portrait by Nick Sinclair, 1991

Secretary of State for National Heritage
- In office 24 September 1992 – 20 July 1994
- Prime Minister: John Major
- Preceded by: David Mellor
- Succeeded by: Stephen Dorrell

Secretary of State for Northern Ireland
- In office 24 July 1989 – 10 April 1992
- Prime Minister: Margaret Thatcher; John Major
- Preceded by: Tom King
- Succeeded by: Patrick Mayhew

Paymaster General
- In office 13 July 1987 – 24 July 1989
- Prime Minister: Margaret Thatcher
- Preceded by: Kenneth Clarke
- Succeeded by: The Earl of Caithness

Chairman of the Conservative Party
- In office 13 July 1987 – 24 July 1989
- Prime Minister: Margaret Thatcher
- Preceded by: Norman Tebbit
- Succeeded by: Kenneth Baker

Member of the House of Lords
- Lord Temporal
- Life peerage 30 July 2001 – 18 September 2015

Member of Parliament for the Cities of London and Westminster City of London and Westminster South (1977‍–‍1997)
- In office 24 February 1977 – 14 May 2001
- Preceded by: Christopher Tugendhat
- Succeeded by: Mark Field

Personal details
- Born: Peter Leonard Brooke; 3 March 1934 London, England
- Died: 13 May 2023 (aged 89) Tisbury, Wiltshire, England
- Party: Conservative
- Spouses: Joan Smith (m. 1964; died 1985); Lindsay Allinson (m. 1991)
- Children: 4
- Parents: Henry Brooke; Barbara Mathews
- Education: Balliol College, Oxford; Harvard Business School

Peter Leonard Brooke, Baron Brooke of Sutton Mandeville (3 March 1934 – 13 May 2023), was a British politician. A member of the Conservative Party, he served in the Cabinet under prime ministers Margaret Thatcher and John Major, and was a member of Parliament (MP) representing London and Westminster from 1977 to 2001.

== Early life ==
Brooke was born in London, the son of Henry Brooke, the onetime Home Secretary, and Barbara Mathews. His parents were one of the few married couples where both partners held noble titles in their own right. His younger brother was the judge Sir Henry Brooke. He was educated at Marlborough College and Balliol College, Oxford (where he was president of the Oxford Union), before going on to the Harvard Business School in the United States. After leaving university he worked as a headhunter and was chairman of Spencer Stuart.

== Parliamentary career ==
After unsuccessfully challenging Neil Kinnock at the Labour stronghold of Bedwellty in October 1974, he was elected as MP for the City of London and Westminster South in a by-election in 1977. He was sworn into the Privy council in 1988. He was made Chairman of the Conservative Party in 1987, and then Secretary of State for Northern Ireland in 1989. His speech, made in November 1990 in London, is largely credited with bringing Sinn Féin to the negotiating table, in which he declared that Britain had no "selfish strategic or economic interest" in Northern Ireland and would accept unification, if the people wished it.

In January 1992, Brooke appeared on the Irish chat show, The Late Late Show. After a pleasant interview, the presenter, Gay Byrne, coaxed and goaded the unwilling Brooke into singing "Oh My Darling, Clementine", on a day when seven Protestant construction workers had been killed by an IRA bomb. Many unionists were outraged at what seemed to be a moment clearly out of touch with grieving families, and requested the resignation of Brooke. The incident was a factor in Brooke's being dropped from his position after the April 1992 general election, although Brooke said he had offered his resignation after the incident.

After leaving the Cabinet, Brooke stood unsuccessfully for the position of Speaker of the House of Commons. The House instead elected the Labour MP Betty Boothroyd to the role, with several Conservative MPs voting against Brooke on the grounds that he had too recently been in the Cabinet and was thus insufficiently close to the backbenches. Brooke then remained on the backbenches for a short time, before being brought back into the Cabinet later in the year as Secretary of State for National Heritage, a role he held until 1994. During his time as Heritage Secretary, he oversaw the restoration of Windsor Castle following the fire that had struck the State Apartments in 1992.

== Later life ==
Brooke stepped down as an MP at the 2001 general election and was created a life peer as Baron Brooke of Sutton Mandeville, of Sutton Mandeville in the County of Wiltshire, on 30 July 2001. He was chairman of the Association of Conservative Peers. He was appointed Member of the Order of the Companions of Honour, as his father had been, in 1992. He retired from the House of Lords on 18 September 2015.

== Personal life ==
In 1964, Brooke married Joan Smith; they had four sons, one of whom died as an infant, and were married until her death in 1985, from complications of a surgical procedure. He married Lindsay Allinson in 1991.

Brooke died in Tisbury, Wiltshire, on 13 May 2023, at the age of 89.

== Coat of arms ==
Coat of arms of Peter Brooke, Baron Brooke of Sutton Mandeville
Coronet A Coronet of a Baron Crest A badger sejant erect Proper grasping with both forepaws over the shoulder a cudgel Or. Escutcheon Or two crosses engrailed and conjoined in fess that on the dexter per pale Gules and Sable that on the sinister per pale Sable and Gules. Supporters On either side statant upon a watering can the rose inwards Or a crow close Proper. Motto Ex Fonte Perenni (Out of an Everlasting Brook) Badge Statant upon a watering can the rose to the dexter Or a crow wings elevated and addorsed Proper.

Parliament of the United Kingdom
Preceded by Christopher Tugendhat	Member of Parliament for the City of London and Westminster South; 1977–1997	Constituency abolished
New constituency	Member of Parliament for the Cities of London and Westminster; 1997–2001	Succeeded by Mark Field
Political offices
Preceded by Kenneth Clarke	Paymaster General; 1987–1989	Succeeded by The Earl of Caithness
Preceded by Tom King	Secretary of State for Northern Ireland; 1989–1992	Succeeded by Patrick Mayhew
Preceded by David Mellor	Secretary of State for National Heritage; 1992–1994	Succeeded by Stephen Dorrell
Party political offices
Preceded by Norman Tebbit	Chairman of the Conservative Party; 1987–1989	Succeeded by Kenneth Baker
