= Oliver Crosthwaite-Eyre =

British politician (1913–1978)

Colonel Sir Oliver Crosthwaite-Eyre (14 October 1913 – 3 February 1978) was a British Conservative Party politician.

The elder son of Major John Symons Crosthwaite (later Crosthwaite-Eyre) of Glaschville, Knoydart, Inverness-shire by his wife Dorothy Muriel, the daughter and heiress of George Edward Briscoe Eyre, of Warrens House, Wiltshire, he was granted his maternal grandfather's estate by his mother in 1947. Educated at Downside School and Trinity College, Cambridge, he attained the rank of Colonel in the Royal Marines in 1945, following which he embarked upon a political career.

At the 1945 general election, Crosthwaite-Eyre was elected as Member of Parliament for the New Forest and Christchurch constituency, and was re-elected in 1950 for the new New Forest constituency. He held the seat until his resignation from the House of Commons in 1968. Following a longstanding family tradition, Sir Oliver spent much of his time involving himself with the New Forest, where he was a verderer from 1948 to 1974. He also remained as chairman of Eyre and Spottiswoode, printers and publishers, until his retirement in 1973.

He married, in 1939, Baroness Maria Alexandra, the daughter of Baron Heinrich von Puthon, of Schloss Mirabel, Salzburg, and had two sons (Anthony and John) and three daughters (Phillipa, Mary and Loelia).

Parliament of the United Kingdom
Preceded by John Digby Mills	Member of Parliament for New Forest & Christchurch; 1945 – 1950	Constituency abolished
New constituency	Member of Parliament for New Forest; 1950 – 1968	Succeeded by Patrick McNair-Wilson
