= John Penn (Conservative politician) =

British politician

Penn in 1895.

John Penn (30 March 1848 – 21 November 1903) was a British Conservative Party politician who served as Member of Parliament (MP) for Lewisham from 1891 to 1903.

John Penn was the eldest son of the marine engineer John Penn. He was educated at Harrow School and Trinity College, Cambridge. Though he managed his father's firm, John Penn and Sons, he was not trained as an engineer. He was apparently "one of the best-known Parliamentary golfers, having a fine private course at Archerfield, North Berwick".

Parliament of the United Kingdom
Preceded by Viscount Lewisham	Member of Parliament for Lewisham; 1891 – 1903	Succeeded by Sir Edward Coates
