= Lewisham (UK Parliament constituency) =

Parliamentary constituency in the United Kingdom, 1885–1918

- Former borough constituency for the House of Commons
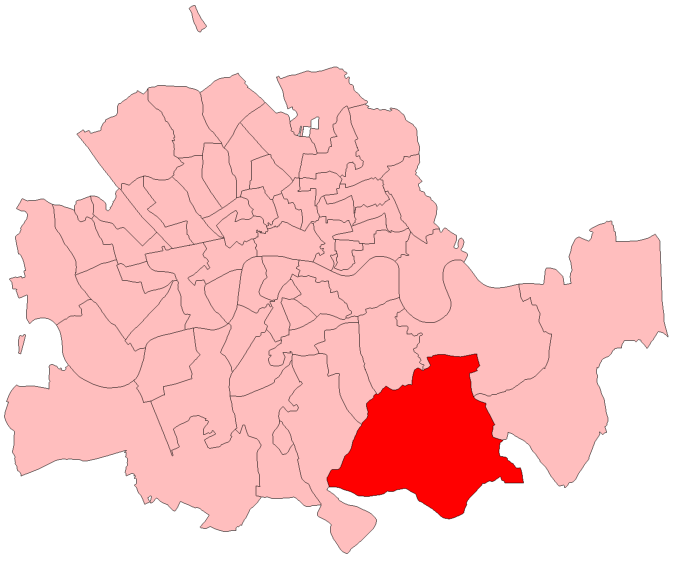
- Lewisham in London

1885–1918
- Seats: one
- Created from: West Kent
- Replaced by: Lewisham East and Lewisham West

Lewisham was a borough constituency in the Lewisham district of London. It returned one Member of Parliament (MP) to the House of Commons of the Parliament of the United Kingdom, elected by the first past the post system.

== History ==
The constituency was created by the Redistribution of Seats Act 1885 for the 1885 general election, and abolished for the 1918 general election. It was replaced by the new Lewisham East and Lewisham West constituencies.

During its existence Lewisham was a safe Conservative seat. In Lewisham, between 1885 and 1906, the electorate more than doubled and over this period the population of poorer people in the constituency grew. Over the six general elections of 1885, 1886, 1892, 1906 and January and December 1910 the average Conservative share of the vote in Lewisham was 63.0%.

== Boundaries ==
1885–1918: The parishes of Lewisham and Lee.

== Members of Parliament ==
Election	Member	Party
1885	William Legge	Conservative
1891	John Penn	Conservative
1903	Sir Edward Coates	Conservative
1918	constituency abolished: see Lewisham East and Lewisham West	

== Election results ==
=== Elections in the 1880s ===
1885 general election: Lewisham
Party	Candidate	Votes	%	±%
Conservative	William Legge	4,244	58.4	
Liberal	Benjamin Whitworth	3,019	41.6	
Majority		1,225	16.8	
Turnout		7,263	78.3	
Registered electors		9,280		
Conservative win (new seat)				

1886 general election: Lewisham
Party	Candidate	Votes	%	±%
Conservative	William Legge	3,839	69.5	+11.1
Liberal	George Offor	1,688	30.5	−11.1
Majority		2,151	39.0	+22.2
Turnout		5,527	59.6	−18.7
Registered electors		9,280		
Conservative hold		Swing	+11.1	

Legge was appointed Vice-Chamberlain of the Household, requiring a by-election.

By-election, 11 Aug 1886: Lewisham
Party	Candidate	Votes	%	±%
Conservative	William Legge	Unopposed		
Conservative hold				

=== Elections in the 1890s ===
Penn

1891 Lewisham by-election
Party	Candidate	Votes	%	±%
Conservative	John Penn	4,585	61.3	−8.2
Liberal	George Septimus Warmington	2,892	38.7	+8.2
Majority		1,693	22.6	−16.4
Turnout		7,477	64.2	+4.6
Registered electors		11,650		
Conservative hold		Swing	−8.2	

- Caused by Legge's succession to the peerage, becoming Earl of Dartmouth.

1892 general election: Lewisham
Party	Candidate	Votes	%	±%
Conservative	John Penn	5,309	64.7	−4.8
Liberal	George Alfred Harvey	2,895	35.3	+4.8
Majority		2,414	29.4	−9.6
Turnout		8,204	69.3	+9.7
Registered electors		11,834		
Conservative hold		Swing	−4.8	

1895 general election: Lewisham
Party	Candidate	Votes	%	±%
Conservative	John Penn	Unopposed		
Conservative hold				

=== Elections in the 1900s ===
1900 general election: Lewisham
Party	Candidate	Votes	%	±%
Conservative	John Penn	Unopposed		
Conservative hold				

Cleland

1903 Lewisham by-election
Party	Candidate	Votes	%	±%
Conservative	Edward Coates	7,709	57.5	N/A
Liberal	James William Cleland	5,697	42.5	New
Majority		2,012	15.0	N/A
Turnout		13,406	71.7	N/A
Registered electors		18,708		
Conservative hold				

1906 general election: Lewisham
Party	Candidate	Votes	%	±%
Conservative	Edward Coates	9,689	54.8	N/A
Liberal	Frederick Wilkins Aveling	8,006	45.2	N/A
Majority		1,683	9.6	N/A
Turnout		17,695	79.6	N/A
Registered electors		22,243		
Conservative hold		Swing	N/A	

=== Elections in the 1910s ===
January 1910 general election: Lewisham
Party	Candidate	Votes	%	±%
Conservative	Edward Coates	12,690	58.6	+3.8
Liberal	Felix Rosenheim	8,960	41.4	−3.8
Majority		3,730	17.2	+7.6
Turnout		21,650	86.5	+6.9
Conservative hold		Swing	+3.8	

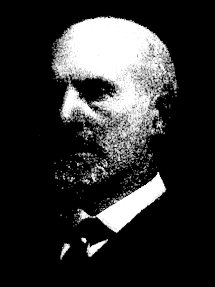
O'Malley

December 1910 general election: Lewisham
Party	Candidate	Votes	%	±%
Conservative	Edward Coates	11,179	62.2	+3.6
Liberal	Edward Loughlin O'Malley	6,792	37.8	−3.6
Majority		4,387	24.4	+7.2
Turnout		17,971	71.8	−14.7
Conservative hold		Swing	+3.6	
