= Alfred Mathews =

Wales international rugby union footballer & priest

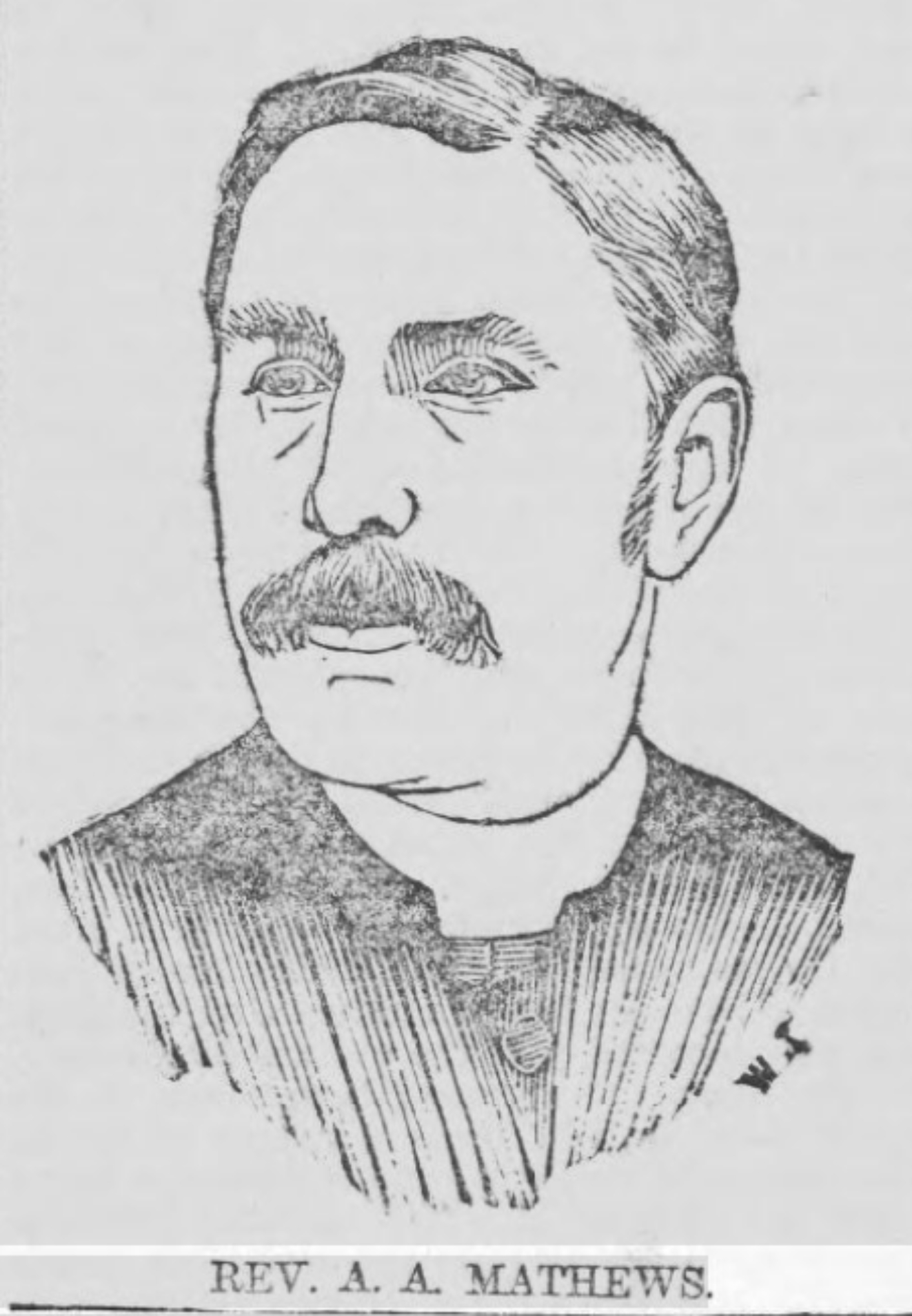
- A Drawing of Alfred Augustus Mathews
- Born: Alfred Augustus Mathews; 7 February 1864 Rhymney, Wales
- Died: 12 August 1946 (aged 82) Malpas, Wales
- School: Llandovery College
- University: St David's College, Lampeter

Rugby union career
- Position: Half-back
Amateur team(s)
Years	Team	Apps	(Points)
- Lampeter Town RFC
–	Swansea RFC		
International career
Years	Team	Apps	(Points)
1886	Wales	1	(0)

Alfred Augustus Mathews (7 February 1864 – 12 August 1946) was a Welsh priest who was notable as a rugby union player in his youth; representing Lampeter at club level and playing a single international match for Wales.

== Biography ==
Mathews was born on 7 February 1864. He was educated at Llandovery College before matriculating to St David's College, Lampeter. A clergyman by profession, after ordination he was curate, and then vicar of Holy Trinity, Swansea from 1887 to 1897. He became vicar of Blaenavon in 1897 and remained in Monmouthshire until his death. He married Ethel Frances, and they had five children, the youngest, Barbara Muriel Mathews was to become Barbara Brooke, Baroness Brooke of Ystradfellte, a British life peer. He died on 12 August 1946.

== Rugby career ==
Mathews began playing rugby at a young age, taking up the sport as a schoolboy at Llandovery College. He continued playing the sport when he matriculated to St David's. Mathews played only a single game for Wales, when he faced Scotland in the second and final Welsh match of the 1886 Home Nations Championship. Played at the Cardiff Arms Park, Mathews was brought into the team at halfback, replacing captain Charlie Newman, and partnered with William Stadden of Cardiff. The game was an important match in the history of rugby, as it was the first international to see the use of the four three-quarter system, brought in by Frank Hancock. The game did not go well for Wales and the three-quarter system was abandoned mid-match, which caused further confusion, resulting in a simple Scottish victory. Newman was re-selected to his position for the next season, and Mathews did not represent Wales at rugby again.

Despite an end to his international career, Mathews later joined first-class Welsh team Swansea RFC, and was part of the team that faced the touring New Zealand Natives in 1888.

=== International games played ===
Wales

- Scotland 1886

== Bibliography ==
- Godwin, Terry (1984). The International Rugby Championship 1883-1983. Grafton Street, London: Willow Books. ISBN 0-00-218060-X.
- Griffiths, Terry (1987). The Phoenix Book of International Rugby Records. London: Phoenix House. ISBN 0-460-07003-7.
- Smith, David; Williams, Gareth (1980). Fields of Praise: The Official History of The Welsh Rugby Union. Cardiff: University of Wales Press. ISBN 0-7083-0766-3.
