= Lewisham West (UK Parliament constituency) =

Parliamentary constituency in the United Kingdom, 1918–2010

Coordinates: 51.435°N 0.034°W

- Former borough constituency for the House of Commons
- Boundary of Lewisham West in Greater London for the 2005 general election
- County: Greater London

1918–2010
- Seats: One
- Created from: Lewisham
- Replaced by: Lewisham West and Penge

Lewisham West was a borough constituency in south-east London represented in the House of Commons of the Parliament of the United Kingdom. It elected one Member of Parliament (MP) by the first past the post system of election from 1918, until it was abolished for the 2010 general election.

== History ==
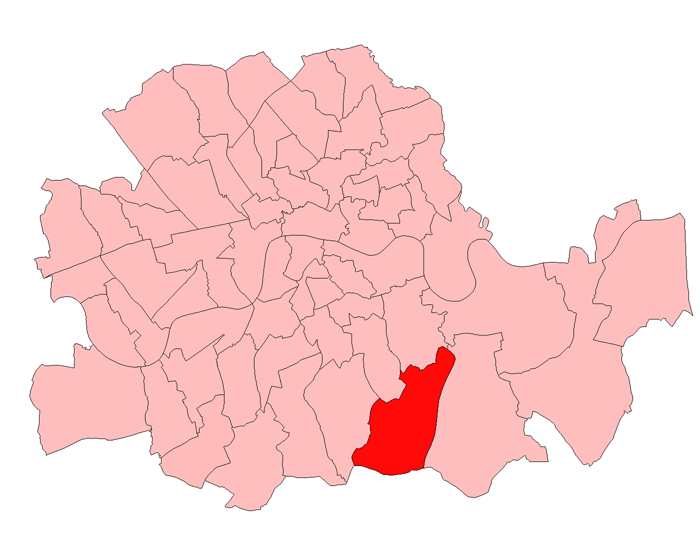
Lewisham West in London 1918-50

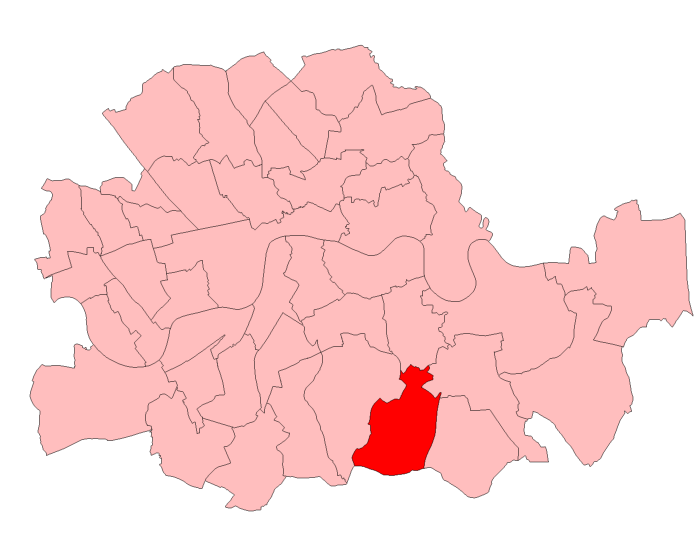
Lewisham West in London 1950-74

Aside from a Labour gain in 1945 after the party's landslide general election victory, Lewisham West was a fairly safe Conservative seat from its creation in 1918, but from 1966 until 1992, it became a classic bellwether seat, being won by whichever party won the General Election (with the exception of 1979). However, long-term demographic trends turned the seat away from being a Labour-Conservative marginal into a safe Labour seat. Partly this occurred because of a strong increase in the number of ethnic minority residents. At the same time, the communities of Catford, Sydenham and Forest Hill became much less leafy and suburban over 30 years. The large council estate of Bellingham was a Labour stronghold, as other areas of the seat became increasingly safe for Labour, whereas in the past they were not.

== Boundaries ==
1918–1950: The Metropolitan Borough of Lewisham wards of Brockley, Forest Hill, and Sydenham, and parts of the wards of Catford and Lewisham Village.

1950–1974: The Metropolitan Borough of Lewisham wards of Brockley, Forest Hill, Honor Oak Park, Sydenham East, and Sydenham West.

1974–1983: The London Borough of Lewisham wards of Bellingham, Culverley, Forest Hill, Honor Oak Park, Rushey Green, Sydenham East, and Sydenham West.

1983–2010: The London Borough of Lewisham wards of Bellingham, Catford, Forest Hill, Horniman, Perry Hill, Rushey Green, St Andrew, Sydenham East, and Sydenham West.

Lewisham West constituency covered the south-western part of the London Borough of Lewisham, being largely based on the communities of Catford, Sydenham, Forest Hill and Bellingham.

=== Boundary review ===
Following their review of parliamentary representation in South London, the Boundary Commission for England created a new constituency of Lewisham West and Penge, using electoral wards from Bromley and Lewisham.

== Members of Parliament ==
Election	Member	Party
1918	Edward Feetham Coates	Coalition Conservative
1921 by-election	Philip Dawson	Conservative
1938 by-election	Henry Brooke	Conservative
1945	Arthur Skeffington	Labour
1950	Henry Price	Conservative
1964	Patrick McNair-Wilson	Conservative
1966	James Dickens	Labour
1970	John Gummer	Conservative
Feb 1974	Christopher Price	Labour
1983	John Maples	Conservative
1992	Jim Dowd	Labour
2010	constituency abolished: see Lewisham West and Penge	

== Elections ==
=== Elections in the 2000s ===
General election 2005: Lewisham West
Party	Candidate	Votes	%	±%
Labour	Jim Dowd	16,611	52.0	–9.0
Liberal Democrats	Alex Feakes	6,679	20.9	+7.5
Conservative	Evett McAnuff	6,396	20.0	–2.3
Green	Nick Long	1,464	4.6	New
UKIP	Jens Winton	773	2.4	+0.8
Majority		9,932	31.1	–7.6
Turnout		31,923	54.7	+4.2
Registered electors		58,349		
Labour hold		Swing	–8.2	

General election 2001: Lewisham West
Party	Candidate	Votes	%	±%
Labour	Jim Dowd	18,816	61.1	–0.9
Conservative	Gareth Johnson	6,896	22.4	–1.5
Liberal Democrats	Richard Thomas	4,146	13.5	+3.7
UKIP	Frederick Pearson	485	1.6	New
Independent	Nick Long	472	1.5	New
Majority		11,920	38.7	+0.6
Turnout		30,815	50.6	–13.5
Registered electors		60,947		
Labour hold		Swing	+0.3	

=== Elections in the 1990s ===
General election 1997: Lewisham West
Party	Candidate	Votes	%	±%
Labour	Jim Dowd	23,273	62.0	+15.0
Conservative	Clare Whelan	8,956	23.8	−19.0
Liberal Democrats	Kathy McGrath	3,672	9.8	−0.1
Referendum	Anthony Leese	1,098	2.9	New
Socialist Labour	Nick Long	398	1.1	New
Liberal	Elizabeth Oram	167	0.4	New
Majority		14,317	38.1	+33.9
Turnout		37,564	64.0	−9.1
Registered electors		58,659		
Labour hold		Swing	+17.0	

General election 1992: Lewisham West
Party	Candidate	Votes	%	±%
Labour	Jim Dowd	20,378	47.0	+9.1
Conservative	John Maples	18,569	42.8	−3.4
Liberal Democrats	Mrs E Neale	4,295	9.9	−6.0
Anti-Federalist League	P Coulam	125	0.3	New
Majority		1,809	4.2	N/A
Turnout		43,367	73.0	+0.8
Registered electors		59,317		
Labour gain from Conservative		Swing	+6.2	

=== Elections in the 1980s ===
General election 1987: Lewisham West
Party	Candidate	Votes	%	±%
Conservative	John Maples	20,995	46.2	+2.2
Labour	Jim Dowd	17,223	37.9	–0.5
Liberal	Sarah Titley	7,247	15.9	–0.9
Majority		3,772	8.3	+2.6
Turnout		45,465	72.2	+1.9
Registered electors		62,923		
Conservative hold		Swing	+1.3	

General election 1983: Lewisham West
Party	Candidate	Votes	%	±%
Conservative	John Maples	19,521	44.0	–0.2
Labour	Christopher Price	17,015	38.4	–7.7
Liberal	Hugh Mooney	7,470	16.8	+9.3
BNP	R. F. Hoy	336	0.8	New
Majority		2,506	5.7	N/A
Turnout		44,342	70.3	
Registered electors		63,043		
Conservative gain from Labour		Swing	+3.7	

=== Elections in the 1970s ===
1979 notional result
Party	Vote	%
Labour	21,871	46.1
Conservative	21,004	44.3
Liberal	3,583	7.6
Others	991	2.1
Turnout	47,449	
Electorate		

General election 1979: Lewisham West
Party	Candidate	Votes	%	±%
Labour	Christopher Price	20,932	46.4	–1.8
Conservative	Noel Kemp	19,882	44.1	+8.5
Liberal	Godfrey Payne	3,350	7.4	–6.2
National Front	Peter Williams	901	2.0	–0.5
Majority		1,050	2.3	–10.3
Turnout		45,065	76.0	+5.9
Registered electors		59,292		
Labour hold		Swing	–5.2	

General election October 1974: Lewisham West
Party	Candidate	Votes	%	±%
Labour	Christopher Price	21,102	48.2	+5.0
Conservative	M. Marshall	15,573	35.6	–2.7
Liberal	James Eagle	5,952	13.6	–2.7
National Front	P. Williams	1,114	2.5	+0.5
Majority		5,529	12.6	+7.7
Turnout		43,741	70.1	–8.8
Registered electors		62,435		
Labour hold		Swing	+3.9	

General election February 1974: Lewisham West
Party	Candidate	Votes	%	±%
Labour	Christopher Price	21,118	43.3	–6.4
Conservative	John Gummer	18,716	38.4	–12.0
Liberal	James Eagle	7,974	16.3	New
National Front	P. Williams	1,000	2.0	New
Majority		2,402	4.9	N/A
Turnout		48,808	78.9	+11.6
Registered electors		61,866		
Labour gain from Conservative		Swing	+2.8	

1970 notional result
Party	Vote	%
Conservative	22,200	50.3
Labour	21,900	49.7
Turnout	44,100	67.3
Electorate	65,499	

General election 1970: Lewisham West
Party	Candidate	Votes	%	±%
Conservative	John Gummer	19,676	51.0	
Labour	James Dickens	18,916	49.0	
Majority		760	2.0	N/A
Turnout		38,592	68.1	
Registered electors				
Conservative gain from Labour		Swing		

=== Elections in the 1960s ===
General election 1966: Lewisham West
Party	Candidate	Votes	%	±%
Labour	James Dickens	21,018	52.54	
Conservative	Patrick McNair-Wilson	18,984	47.46	
Majority		2,034	5.08	N/A
Turnout		40,002	75.68	
Registered electors				
Labour gain from Conservative		Swing		

General election 1964: Lewisham West
Party	Candidate	Votes	%	±%
Conservative	Patrick McNair-Wilson	18,167	44.78	
Labour	Joan Lestor	17,281	42.59	
Liberal	Alan B Mountain	5,123	12.63	
Majority		886	2.19	
Turnout		40,571	74.82	
Registered electors				
Conservative hold		Swing		

=== Elections in the 1950s ===
General election 1959: Lewisham West
Party	Candidate	Votes	%	±%
Conservative	Henry Price	22,466	51.74	
Labour	Richard C Edmonds	16,233	37.39	
Liberal	Trevor Smith	4,721	10.87	New
Majority		6,233	14.35	
Turnout		38,689	80.30	
Registered electors				
Conservative hold		Swing		

General election 1955: Lewisham West
Party	Candidate	Votes	%	±%
Conservative	Henry Price	24,066	54.94	
Labour	Tom Sargant	19,741	45.06	
Majority		4,325	9.88	
Turnout		43,807	79.57	
Registered electors				
Conservative hold		Swing		

General election 1951: Lewisham West
Party	Candidate	Votes	%	±%
Conservative	Henry Price	25,449	52.73	
Labour	Arthur Skeffington	22,813	47.27	
Majority		2,636	5.46	
Turnout		48,262	85.85	
Registered electors				
Conservative hold		Swing		

General election 1950: Lewisham West
Party	Candidate	Votes	%	±%
Conservative	Henry Price	23,628	49.23	
Labour	Arthur Skeffington	21,433	44.65	
Liberal	Alfred Pritchard	2,939	6.12	New
Majority		2,195	4.58	N/A
Turnout		45,061	85.70	
Registered electors				
Conservative gain from Labour		Swing		

=== Elections in the 1940s ===
General election 1945: Lewisham West
Party	Candidate	Votes	%	±%
Labour	Arthur Skeffington	20,008	53.35	
Conservative	Henry Brooke	17,492	46.65	
Majority		2,516	6.70	N/A
Turnout		37,500	73.65	
Registered electors				
Labour gain from Conservative		Swing		

=== Elections in the 1930s ===
1938 Lewisham West by-election
Party	Candidate	Votes	%	±%
Conservative	Henry Brooke	22,587	57.1	−7.6
Labour	Arthur Skeffington	16,939	42.9	+7.6
Majority		5,648	14.2	−15.2
Turnout		39,526	58.0	−5.9
Registered electors				
Conservative hold		Swing		

General election 1935: Lewisham West
Party	Candidate	Votes	%	±%
Conservative	Sir Philip Dawson	27,173	64.7	−12.8
Labour	Michael Stewart	14,803	35.3	+12.8
Majority		12,370	29.4	−25.6
Turnout		41,976	63.9	−5.3
Registered electors				
Conservative hold		Swing		

General election 1931: Lewisham West
Party	Candidate	Votes	%	±%
Conservative	Sir Philip Dawson	34,289	77.5	+28.4
Labour	Michael Stewart	9,956	22.5	−3.4
Majority		24,333	55.0	+31.8
Turnout		44,245	69.2	−0.1
Registered electors				
Conservative hold		Swing		

=== Elections in the 1920s ===
General election 1929: Lewisham West
Party	Candidate	Votes	%	±%
Unionist	Philip Dawson	20,830	49.1	−10.2
Labour	Catherine Wadham	10,958	25.9	+5.5
Liberal	Arthur Roberts	10,590	25.0	+4.7
Majority		9,872	23.2	−15.7
Turnout		42,378	69.3	−6.2
Registered electors		61,191		
Unionist hold		Swing	−7.9	

General election 1924: Lewisham West
Party	Candidate	Votes	%	±%
Unionist	Philip Dawson	19,723	59.3	+8.4
Labour	Barbara Drake	6,781	20.4	New
Liberal	Barrett O'Malley	6,756	20.3	−28.8
Majority		12,942	38.9	+37.1
Turnout		33,260	75.5	+18.5
Registered electors		44,078		
Unionist hold		Swing	+18.6	

General election 1923: Lewisham West
Party	Candidate	Votes	%	±%
Unionist	Philip Dawson	12,448	50.9	−14.8
Liberal	Barrett O'Malley	12,009	49.1	+14.8
Majority		439	1.8	−29.6
Turnout		24,457	57.0	−1.1
Registered electors		42,940		
Unionist hold		Swing	−14.8	

General election 1922: Lewisham West
Party	Candidate	Votes	%	±%
Unionist	Philip Dawson	16,216	65.7	N/A
Liberal	Barrett O'Malley	8,469	34.3	N/A
Majority		7,747	31.4	N/A
Turnout		24,685	58.1	N/A
Registered electors		42,455		
Unionist hold		Swing	N/A	

1921 Lewisham West by-election
Party	Candidate	Votes	%	±%
Unionist	Philip Dawson	9,427	39.0	N/A
Anti-Waste League	Walter Windham	8,580	35.4	New
Liberal	Frank Raffety	6,211	25.6	New
Majority		847	3.6	N/A
Turnout		24,218	59.2	N/A
Registered electors		40,919		
Unionist hold		Swing	N/A	

=== Elections in the 1910s ===
General election 1918: Lewisham West
Party		Candidate	Votes	%
C	Unionist	Sir Edward Coates	Unopposed	
	Unionist win (new seat)			
C indicates candidate endorsed by the coalition government.

== See also ==
- List of parliamentary constituencies in London

== Sources ==
- Iain Dale, ed. (2003). The Times House of Commons 1929, 1931, 1935. Politico's (reprint). ISBN 1-84275-033-X.
- The Times House of Commons 1945. The Times. 1945.
- The Times House of Commons 1950. The Times. 1950.
- The Times House of Commons 1955. The Times. 1955.
- Craig, F. W. S. (1983) [1969]. British parliamentary election results 1918-1949 (3rd ed.). Chichester: Parliamentary Research Services. ISBN 0-900178-06-X.
- Leigh Rayment's Historical List of MPs – Constituencies beginning with "L" (part 2)
