= Philip Dawson =

British politician (1866–1938)

Sir Philip Dawson (6 October 1866 – 24 September 1938) was a British electrical engineer, volunteer soldier (lieutenant-colonel), Conservative politician and MP.

== Life ==
Following education at Ghent and Liège Universities, Dawson became a member of the Institutes of Civil, Mechanical, and Electrical Engineers. He became a partner in the firm of Kincaid, Waller, Manville and Dawson, consulting engineers. He worked on dock developments and electrical supply and traction projects throughout the British Empire, on the continent of Europe and in South America. He was engaged in the electrification of the London Brighton and South Coast Railway, and was awarded the George Stephenson Medal by the Institution of Civil Engineers and the Gold Medal by the Institute of Transport. Dawson developed an ability to converse in French, German, Italian, Dutch, Portuguese and Russian.

In 1902 Dawson moved to Sydenham, South London. He received a commission in the Volunteer Force, rising to the rank of lieutenant-colonel and becoming commanding officer of the 3rd Volunteer Battalion, Royal West Kent Regiment.

During the First World War Dawson worked for the Ministry of Munitions, and was a member of the Water Power Resources Committee of the Board of Trade. In 1919 he was made a chevalier of the Belgian Order of Leopold for technical services rendered during the war, and in the 1920 Birthday Honours was knighted by George V for his work with the Disposal and Liquidation Commission.

He became involved in Conservative politics, and was elected to the London County Council as a member of the Conservative-backed Municipal Reform Party, representing Lewisham West in 1919.

In 1921, Sir Edward Coates, the sitting Member of Parliament (MP) for Lewisham West, died suddenly. Dawson was elected as Conservative MP at the ensuing by-election. He held the seat at successive elections until his death in September 1938. He was described as being on the "right centre" of the Conservative Party. In 1935 his opposition to the Government of India Act nearly led to break with the party. Dawson was an admirer of the Italian dictator Benito Mussolini, and in April 1938 he became chairman of the newly formed Anglo-Italian Parliamentary Committee.

In June 1927 Dawson operating from St. Stephen's House, Victoria Embankment, Westminster, S.W.1., prepared a report, addressed to Sir Felix J. C. Pole, General Manager, Great Western Railway, Paddington Station, W.2. entitled Electrification of the Main Line Taunton to Penzance and Branches West of Taunton.

In September 1938 he attended the Inter-Parliamentary Business Congress in Warsaw. On his journey home he was taken ill with a heart complaint, and died in a Berlin nursing home on 24 September, aged 71.

Parliament of the United Kingdom
Preceded by Edward Coates	Member of Parliament for Lewisham West; 1921–1938	Succeeded by Henry Brooke
