= 1938 Lewisham West by-election =

UK parliamentary by-election

The 1938 Lewisham West by-election was a parliamentary by-election held for the British House of Commons constituency of Lewisham West on 24 November 1938.

== Campaign ==
The by-election was the sixth to be held after the Munich Agreement was signed by the British Prime Minister, Neville Chamberlain, and the German dictator, Adolf Hitler.

The National Conservative candidate, Henry Brooke, campaigned strongly in favour of Munich. Chamberlain sent a message to Brooke: "I was very pleased to hear that you had been adopted as the National Government candidate in the West Lewisham by-election. Having been brought into personal contact with you in your work I have formed a high opinion of your ability and sound judgment, and I am sure that the qualities which you possess will stand you in good stead in Parliament".

In his election address, Brooke proclaimed to be a whole-hearted admirer of Chamberlain. He said that no one but Chamberlain "could have saved this and the world from appalling tragedy of war a few weeks ago. Had it not been for his courage, his pertinacity, and his profound faith that reason could be made to triumph, Czechoslovakia by now would have been swept out of existence, and men, women, and children indiscriminately would have been killed by the bombing of London...I warn you not to be led astray by untruths and deceptive half-truths, especially coming from those who at the last election opposed the National Government's decision to rearm, and now recklessly advocate policies which would lead straight towards war".

In a second address to the electorate, Brooke declared: "To save you from another war and to establish lasting peace on a basis of justice. To help make our country so strong that she shall be treated everywhere with respect. To work to attain security of employment, and to promote the prosperity of trade and industry with that end in view". Brooke also opposed returning to Germany her ex-colonies that had been confiscated from her after the First World War.

Arthur Skeffington, the Labour candidate, claimed that the relief that war was avoided by Munich had given way to a profound uneasiness at the way it had been achieved. He argued: "We cannot hide from ourselves that the terms secured by Hitler represented a triumph, not for reason, but for blackmail by threats of force. The democratic Czechoslovak Republic has been handed over to dismemberment and despoiled by ruthless dictatorships. But that is not all. Everywhere the people have suffered a major defeat. Hitler has gained vastly increased resources to equip him for further aggression. Not peace has been attained but only an armed truce—which is apparently to be used to pile up more armaments. No criticism of the Munich Agreement could be more damning". Skeffington said that Labour's policy would be to bring the peace-loving powers together in a real defensive combination to uphold peace and security. Effective rearmament for this and air raid precautions to protect the people were immediately necessary.

Skeffington's eve-of-poll message to the electorate said that Britain had lost the international prestige it held under Labour's Foreign Secretary, Arthur Henderson, through seven years of National Government and was now engaged in a diplomatic retreat with the threat of war. Skeffington said Labour would increase old age pensions, improve education and extend social services.

== Result ==
Lewisham West by-election, 1938
Party	Candidate	Votes	%	±%
Conservative	Henry Brooke	22,587	57.1	−7.6
Labour	Arthur Skeffington	16,939	42.9	+7.5
Majority		5,648	14.2	−15.3
Turnout		39,526	58.0	−5.9
Conservative hold		Swing		

== Previous result ==
United Kingdom general election, 1935: Lewisham West
Party	Candidate	Votes	%	±%
Unionist	Philip Dawson	27,123	64.7	−12.8
Labour	R. M. Stewart	14,803	35.4	+12.8
Majority		12,370	29.4	−25.6
Turnout		41,976	63.9	−5.3
Unionist hold		Swing		
