= Sir Edward Coates, 1st Baronet =

British politician and stockbroker (1853–1921)

Major Sir Edward Coates DL
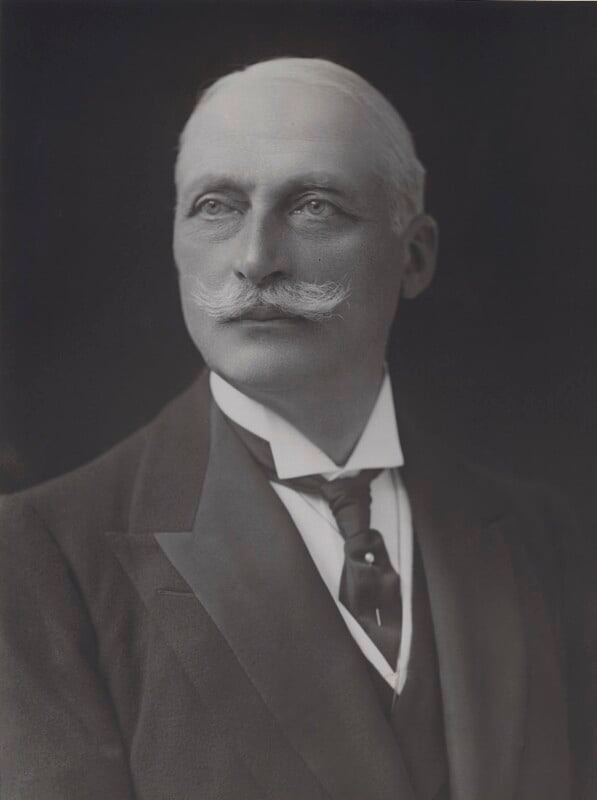
- Coates in the 1910s

Member of Parliament for Lewisham West Lewisham (1903–1918)
- In office 15 December 1903 – 14 August 1921
- Preceded by: John Penn
- Succeeded by: Philip Dawson

Personal details
- Born: 25 February 1853
- Died: 14 August 1921 (aged 68)
- Party: Conservative Party
- Parent: John Coates
- Education: Marlborough College
- Occupation: Stockbroker, politician

Major Sir Edward Feetham Coates, 1st Baronet, DL (25 February 1853 – 14 August 1921), was a British stockbroker and politician.

== Early life ==
Sir Edward Coates was born in 1853. His father, John Coates, was a magistrate. He was educated at Marlborough College.

== Career ==
Coates was a member of the city stockbroking firm of Coates and Son.

In 1903 he was elected Conservative Party Member of Parliament (MP) for Lewisham. When that constituency was abolished in 1918 he won the new seat of Lewisham West which he held until his death.

He was an art collector who specialised in old prints and was a trustee of the National Portrait Gallery. He was also a sportsman who took part in shooting, hunting, yachting and coach-driving, and won numerous cups and trophies.

In 1905, he was appointed a deputy lieutenant of Surrey. He was an alderman in Surrey County Council, being chairman of the finance committee for ten years and chairman of the council for four. He was a member of the Duke of Wellington's Regiment and was made a baronet in 1911.

== Death ==
Coates died on 14 August 1921.

Parliament of the United Kingdom
| Preceded by John Penn | Member of Parliament for Lewisham; 1903–1918 | Constituency abolished |
| New constituency | Member of Parliament for Lewisham West; 1918–1921 | Succeeded by Philip Dawson |
Baronetage of the United Kingdom
| New creation | Baronet (of Helperby Hall); 1911–1921 | Succeeded by Clive Coates |
