= Family mediation in Germany =

In Germany, family law was one of the first areas to establish the thought of mediation, and still is the main field of application of mediation. Conflicts in Family Law are characterized by a high rate of personal conflicts. A possible definition of conflict might be:

Conflict means … the perceived differences of interests or the conviction that the actual aspirations of the parties can no be received at the same time.

Basis for personal disputes is the fact that conflicting parties don't come to their own in their personal relationships. After various intents of solving the problems on their own or setting an end to the dispute, the last chance is to get help by a third person. Some hope for an improvement of their marriage by marriage counseling, but in most cases without success. Others try to solve their conflicts by law and hand in a lawsuit. After reviewing this lawsuit, the judge can suggest to consult a mediator, if reasonable.

There are various constellations of conducting the mediation process. Divorces can be regulated by court. Related issues, like child support, visitation rights or household goods can be resolved by mediation. It is also possible to try to solve all controversies in the mediation process. In this case, the parties can plead for abating legal proceedings. The employed lawyers can recommend a mediator and at the same time can be legal aid during the mediation process.

The mediator, as against the consulting lawyer, deals with concerns and interests of both parties. The mediator is not suggested or determined by one party alone. This could lead to unwanted disputes or affect the mediation procedure, because one party could feel disadvantaged. Whether choosing mediation or not is the parties decision. If they decide to conduct the mediation process, but can't agree as intended, it is not of their disadvantage. The still can go back to the legal process and continue the lawsuit, or file a new one.

== Principles of family mediation ==
=== Extrajudicial proceeding ===
At the beginning, the mediation process was known as an extrajudicial proceeding and was introduced as an alternative to the classical lawsuit. In the meantime, more and more mediations are offered in court. They are conducted by a so-called “judge-mediator” after the commencement of proceedings. The number of judges with this additional qualification is not very high, but it is increasing. This development leads to a change in the point of view of mediations. They are no longer seen as alternative to lawsuits, but are regarded as possible element of the litigation. There is no longer competition between the legal process and the mediation process, but addition.

=== Voluntariness ===
It is the marriage partners' decision whether to conduct a mediation process or not, even if it is recommended by court. There is no constraint to take part in the mediation. All parties, also the mediator, are having the right to end the mediation process. So there is no obligation to bring the process to an agreement, exiting the process is possible at any time.

=== Neutrality ===
It is the mediator's responsibility to act as a neutral facilitator. The mediator assists and serves both parties equally while remaining neutral and impartial. The mediator does not favor either side and is expected to treat both parties equally. It may be useful for the mediator not to have a prior relationship with the disputing parties, to reduce the possibility of preferences, discrimination or personal influences on the mediation process. The confidence of both parties in the mediator is important for successful cooperation. If a party questions the mediator's neutrality, continuing the mediation process with another mediator may be considered.

=== Lack of decision-making power ===
The above-mentioned criteria of neutrality and impartiality are also concerning judges. So where is the difference to a mediator? The mediator's essential characteristic is not having any decision-making power in a legal sense. He can support the parties finding a solution and guide them to the right way. At the end of the mediation process, he can make a written agreement, to which the parties must uphold. He needs to fulfill the formalities given for such an agreement. To become legally valid, the agreement needs to be recorded by Family Court or notarially certified.

=== Confidentiality ===
To protect the parties, the mediation process is confidential. When both parties are sure that their information is not made public and is protected against malpractice, they are able to solve the conflict more open. They can be sure that problems that were discussed stay within the mediation group. If the mediation fails, the principle of confidentiality is of high importance, because parties can be sure that, if it comes to a lawsuit, information revealed in the mediation process can not be used against them. This applies for the participating parties as well as for the mediator. Information given by the parties in one-to-one conversations with the mediator also come under the non-disclosure obligation. He is not allowed to reveal it to the other party, except he obtains the permission of the party.

== The process of family mediation ==
The mediator passes through a process with the parties that is divided into five phases:

=== Phase 1: Initiation of mediation process ===
At the beginning the mediator has to comment his mission and function, so that the parties cannot be disappointed during the process. After this discussion, it must be settled if the existent problem of the parties can be answered by a mediation process. At the end of this phase a mediation contract is signed, which contains among other things rights and obligations of the mediator and the parties (modal contract). The meaning of the contract is to lay a code of behavior, on which the involved must be keeping with.

=== Phase 2: Theme collection ===
With the second phase starts the real conflict management. The extent of the conflict will be made clear and the points which are treating over the process are listed in detail. This way the mediator receives an overview about the dimension and is able to create a plan.

=== Phase 3: Resolve the interests ===
This phase is the most important chapter of the mediation process. It is basic to deal explicitly with the conflicts. In this phase the parties must reveal their problems and voice their interests, to find the optimal problem-solving approach. If wishes or demands are not communicated at this, it will be difficult to involve those afterwards in the next phase.

=== Phase 4: Options and solutions ===
After collecting the interests they can be search for common solution options. The different ideas will be collect and afterwards evaluated together. The ideas can be collected in different ways, for example by brainstorming. A solution concept will be designed in this phase and that will be developed in the last phase.

=== Phase 5: The finish ===
At the end of the mediation, the solution concept from phase 4 will be a phrased into binding agreement. The agreement can be discussed with a consultant lawyer. This way the parties can be sure that they have made a decision which is legally correct. The contract is an obligatory agreement. It needs to be validated, for example by notarization.

== Advantages of family mediation in comparison to litigation ==
There is no categorization in wrong or false. No party will be inculpated to be wrong or to have made mistakes in the past. The conflicts are reviewed, but with a forward-looking view to find the best solution the two parties. An advantage of mediation is, that the problems are not delegated, the parties try to solve the conflict themselves. This course might take longer, but after all the parties came as opponents to the mediation process and not as friends. In most cases, the idea of solving the problem wins after some time. Due to the voluntariness of the mediation process, a high commitment of the two parties is to be estimated. A positive attitude is thereby part of the course because the parties can agree in peace. Both parties must agree to the arrangement and need to implement the changes in the future. Furthermore, the mediation should encourage friendly contact between the parties after the mediation process. Mediation shall be an impulse to advance the attitude in the future. So the involved can easily stick to the bargain.

The mediation isn't a judicial action, but for all that the law will be included. Admittedly not with the application of laws but only with the use of them. That means that mediation should be seen as law clarification. The purpose is to represent the three following points, without applying the law:

- Consultation about the legal position: The legal situation will be explained, and how a possible lawsuit would end.
- Decision-making: The legal options will be explained to the parties and they will be encouraged to represent their own interests.
- Form of contract: The parties are shown how the bilateral agreement is transferred into a contract, what legal consequences there are, and which formal requirements are essential.

An advantage of the family mediation in comparison to a lawsuit is the command of openness. The disputing parties are obliged to reveal all necessary facts and information. If any documents are revealed after the end of the mediation process, the agreement can be invalid. In some cases the statutory offense of fraud is given. Another advantage of family mediation is the time. A lawsuit often takes several years, depending on the number of instances. The mediation process takes only several months depending on the type of conflict and the commitment of the disputing parties. Another advantage results from the time saving. The mediation process is less expensive. The mediator claims of course a charge, but this doesn’t overrun the court costs.
