= Walter Windham =

British pioneer of aviation

Sir Walter Windham
- Born: Walter George Smijth-Windham; 15 September 1868
- Died: 5 July 1942 (aged 73); Builth Wells
- Education: Bedford School
- Spouse: Hélène Adeline Blanche Chapman (26 July 1916)

Commander Sir Walter George Windham (15 September 1868 – 5 July 1942) was a British pioneer of aviation, described by The Times as "a guiding genius behind British aviation", who established the world's first airmail services.

== Biography ==
Born on 15 September 1868, the grandson of Lord Charles Russell and the great-grandson of John Russell, 6th Duke of Bedford, Walter Windham was educated at Bedford School. Between 1884 and 1888 he circumnavigated the world four times under sail, and participated in the first London to Brighton Rally in 1896. He was a King's Messenger between 1900 and 1909, driving the first motor vehicle into Whitehall Court, carrying foreign dispatches, on 12 November 1902, and carrying the Anglo-Russian Entente from Saint Petersburg to London in 1907. In 1908 he offered a gold cup to the first airman to fly the English Channel, and this trophy was won by Louis Blériot in 1909. Two weeks later, on 10 August 1909, Hubert Latham flew a letter addressed to Windham from France to England, believed to be the first letter ever transported by air. Windham controlled the first aerial meeting in England, held at Doncaster; and at Bournemouth, in 1910, he entered a monoplane and a biplane which he had constructed, winning a prize in the competition.

In December 1910, Windham made the first passenger flight in Asia and, in 1911, he founded the world's first two airmail services: the first, established in February 1911, from Allahabad crossing the Ganges, and the second, established in September 1911, between Hendon and Windsor. Special stamps and envelopes were issued. He served in the Royal Indian Navy during the First World War, rising to the rank of Commander.

Commander Sir Walter Windham was invested as a Knight Bachelor in 1923 and made a Freeman of the City of London in 1933. He died in Builth Wells on 5 July 1942, aged 73.
