= Legge =

Legge (/lɛɡ/) is a surname. Notable people with the surname include:

- Alexander Legge (1866–1933), US businessman, president of International Harvester
- Anthony Legge (1939–2013), British archaeologist specialized in zooarchaeology
- Arthur Kaye Legge KCB (1766–1835), Royal Navy officer
- Arthur Legge (British Army officer) (1800–1890), British soldier and politician
- Arthur Legge (footballer) (1881–1941), Australian sportsman
- Augustus Legge (1839–1913), bishop of Lichfield from 1891 until 1913
- Barnwell R. Legge (1891–1949), US Army officer and WWII Military Attaché to Switzerland
- Barry Legge (born 1954), retired Canadian ice hockey player who played in the National Hockey League
- Charles A. Legge (1930–2023), United States federal judge
- Charles Legge (1829–1881), Canadian civil engineer and patent solicitor
- David Legge (born 1954), Australian rules footballer with St Kilda
- Dominica Legge (1905–1986), British scholar of the Anglo-Norman language
- Dominique de Legge (born 1952), French politician, member of the Senate of France
- Eddie Legge (1902–1947), Scottish footballer with Carlisle United and York City
- Edward Legge (bishop) (1767–1827), Bishop of Oxford, clergyman
- Edward Legge (Royal Navy officer) (1710–1747), Royal Navy officer and posthumous MP for Portsmouth
- Francis Legge (c. 1719 – 1783), British military officer and colonial official in Nova Scotia
- Geoffrey Legge (1903–1940), English first-class cricketer
- George Legge, 1st Baron Dartmouth (c. 1647 – 1691)
- George Legge, 3rd Earl of Dartmouth (1755–1810)
- Gerald Legge, 9th Earl of Dartmouth (1924–1997)
- Gordon Legge (born 1948), Professor of Psychology at the University of Minnesota
- H. Dormer Legge (1890–1982), British Army officer and philatelist
- Heneage Legge (1788–1844), Member of Parliament for Banbury
- Heneage Legge (1845–1911), MP for St George's Hanover Square, nephew of the above
- Henry Bilson-Legge (1708–1764), English statesman
- Henry Legge (courtier) (1852–1924), Paymaster of the Household to King George V
- Humphry Legge, 8th Earl of Dartmouth (1888–1962)
- James Gordon Legge (1863–1947), WWI Australian Army Lieutenant General
- James Legge (1815–1897), Scottish sinologist (professor of Chinese)
- John Williamson Legge (1917–1996), Australian scientist and activist.
- Lady Joan Margaret Legge (1885–1939), English botanist
- Katherine Legge (born 1980), British racecar driver
- Laura Legge QC (1923–2010), treasurer of the Law Society of Upper Canada
- Leon Legge (born 1985), English footballer who plays for Cambridge United
- Lionel K. Legge (1889–1970), associate justice of the South Carolina Supreme Court
- Michael Legge (actor) (born 1978), British actor
- Michael Legge (comedian) (born 1968), Irish comedian
- Michael Legge (filmmaker) (born 1953), American actor and independent filmmaker
- Paterno Legge, South Sudanese politician, former Minister of Local Government of Central Equatoria
- Randy Legge (1945–2023), Canadian ice hockey defenceman with the New York Rangers
- Robin Legge (1862–1933), English music writer and critic
- Stanley Ferguson Legge CBE (1900–1977), Australian soldier and son of James Gordon Legge
- Thomas Legge (1535–1607), English playwright
- Thomas Morison Legge CBE MD (1863–1932), UK Medical Inspector of Factories and Workshops
- Topsy Jane Legge (1938–2014), English actress under the name of Topsy Jane
- Wade Legge (1934–1963), American jazz pianist and bassist
- Walter Legge (1906–1979), English classical record producer and impresario
- William Gordon Legge (1913–1999), Anglican Bishop of the Diocese of Western Newfoundland
- William Kaye Legge (1869–1946), senior British Army officer during World War I
- William Legge, 1st Earl of Dartmouth (1672–1750)
- William Legge, 2nd Earl of Dartmouth (1731–1801)
- William Legge, 4th Earl of Dartmouth (1784–1853)
- William Legge, 5th Earl of Dartmouth (1823–1891)
- William Legge, 6th Earl of Dartmouth (1851–1936)
- William Legge, 7th Earl of Dartmouth (1881–1958)
- William Legge, 10th Earl of Dartmouth (born 1949)
- William Legge (Royalist) (1608–1670), English royalist army officer
- William Vincent Legge (1841–1918), Australian ornithologist

== See also ==
- Legge romanization, a transcription system for Mandarin Chinese
- Legge-Bourke, a surname
- Legg, a surname
- Legg Mason, multi-national investment firm
- Leg (disambiguation)
