= Leg (disambiguation) =

A leg is a limb used to support an animal or object.

Leg or legs may also refer to:

== Sports and games ==
- Leg (sport), one game of a two-legged match
- Leg (darts), a single game of darts
- Leg, one stage of a relay race
- Leg (rallying), one day in a rally racing event

== Nickname ==
- Legs Diamond (1897–1931), an American gangster
- Legs McNeil (born 1956), a co-founder and writer for Punk Magazine
- Tim Legler (born 1966), American former professional basketball player and analyst

== Entertainment ==
- Legs (comics), a supporting character in various Batman comics
- "Legs" (song), a 1983 song by ZZ Top
- Legs (novel), a 1975 novel by William Kennedy
- The Leg, a Scottish rock band
- Legss, an English rock band
- Legs, a fictional member of the Springfield Mafia in The Simpsons
- "Legs", the pilot episode of Who's Watching the Kids?
- "Legs", a 1985 single by The Art Of Noise

== Military ==
- LEG, low-entry ground troop, is non-Airborne military personnel, not trained to parachute out of an airplane, in American military slang
  - NAP, non-Airborne personnel, is a variation of LEG used in the Jump Management Systems (JMS) for those who are not qualified or whose qualification has lapsed

== Places ==
- Leg (Netherlands), a village in the municipality of Alphen-Chaam
- Łęg (disambiguation), many places in Poland
- Lehnice (Lég in Hungarian), a village and municipality in south-west Slovakia

== In geometry ==
- the catheti of a right triangle
- the congruent sides of an isosceles triangle
- the non-parallel sides of a trapezoid

== Other uses ==
- Legs (Chinese constellation)
- Another name for a stream of cash flow in finance; see swap (finance)
- LEG, station code for Lea Green railway station in St. Helens, Merseyside, England
- LEG, Lusatian Railway Company, former German railway company
- Legs, narrow drapes at the side of a stage

== See also ==
- Crazy Legs (disambiguation)
- Legg (disambiguation)
- Lung Leg, nickname of American actress Elisabeth Carr (born 1963)
- Legge, a surname
