= Raine Spencer, Countess Spencer =

British socialite (1929–2016)

The Right Honourable The Countess Spencer
- Countess Spencer in 1950
- Born: Raine McCorquodale; 9 September 1929; Mayfair, London, England
- Died: 21 October 2016 (aged 87); Mayfair, London, England
- Resting place: North Sheen Cemetery
- Occupations: Socialite and politician
- Spouses: Gerald Legge, 9th Earl of Dartmouth (m. 1948; div. 1976) John Spencer, 8th Earl Spencer (m. 1976; died 1992) Jean-François Pineton de Chambrun (m. 1993; div. 1995)
- Children: William Legge, 10th Earl of Dartmouth; Rupert Legge; Charlotte Paternó Castello, Duchess of Carcaci; Henry Legge
- Parent(s): Alexander McCorquodale; Dame Barbara Cartland

Raine Spencer, Countess Spencer (née McCorquodale; 9 September 1929 – 21 October 2016) was a British socialite and an elected local councillor. She was the daughter of Alexander McCorquodale and the romantic novelist and socialite Barbara Cartland, and the stepmother of Diana, Princess of Wales.

== Early years ==
Raine McCorquodale was born at 6 Culross Street in Mayfair, London, the only child of novelist Barbara Cartland and Alexander George McCorquodale of White Lodge, Speen in Berkshire, an Army officer who was heir to an old printing fortune. Her parents divorced in 1936, and her mother promptly married Alexander's cousin, Hugh McCorquodale, by whom she had two sons, Ian and Glen.

== Countess of Dartmouth ==
In 1947, 18-year-old Raine McCorquodale was launched as a debutante into London high society. She had a successful season, being named debutante of the year and becoming engaged to Gerald Humphry Legge. She and Legge married on 21 July 1948. He succeeded to the courtesy title Viscount Lewisham in 1958 and became the 9th Earl of Dartmouth in 1962. The couple had four children:

- William Legge, 10th Earl of Dartmouth (23 September 1949). He married Fiona Campbell in June 2009. They have one son.
- The Hon. Rupert Legge (1 January 1953). He married Victoria S. Ottley in 1984. They have two children.
- Lady Charlotte Legge (16 July 1963). She married Don Alessandro Paternò Castello, 13th Duke of Carcaci on 19 December 1990. They have three children.
- The Hon. Henry Legge (28 December 1968). He married Cressida Hogg (daughter of Sir Christopher Anthony Hogg) on 21 December 1995. They have three daughters.

Following her marriage, Lady Dartmouth began to take a strong interest in local politics. At age 23, she became the youngest member of Westminster City Council as a Conservative. As Lady Lewisham, and later Lady Dartmouth, she remained in local government for the following 17 years. She sat on Westminster's town planning, parks and personnel committees, and was later elected to represent Lewisham South on the London County Council, then Richmond upon Thames on the Greater London Council. In this capacity she took a special interest in environmental planning and ancient buildings. She chaired the Covent Garden Development Committee and the government working party for the United Nations Conference on the Human Environment in Stockholm.

In 1973, she began an affair with John Spencer, Viscount Althorp, her colleague on an architectural heritage committee. The Earl and Countess of Dartmouth divorced in 1976.

== Countess Spencer ==
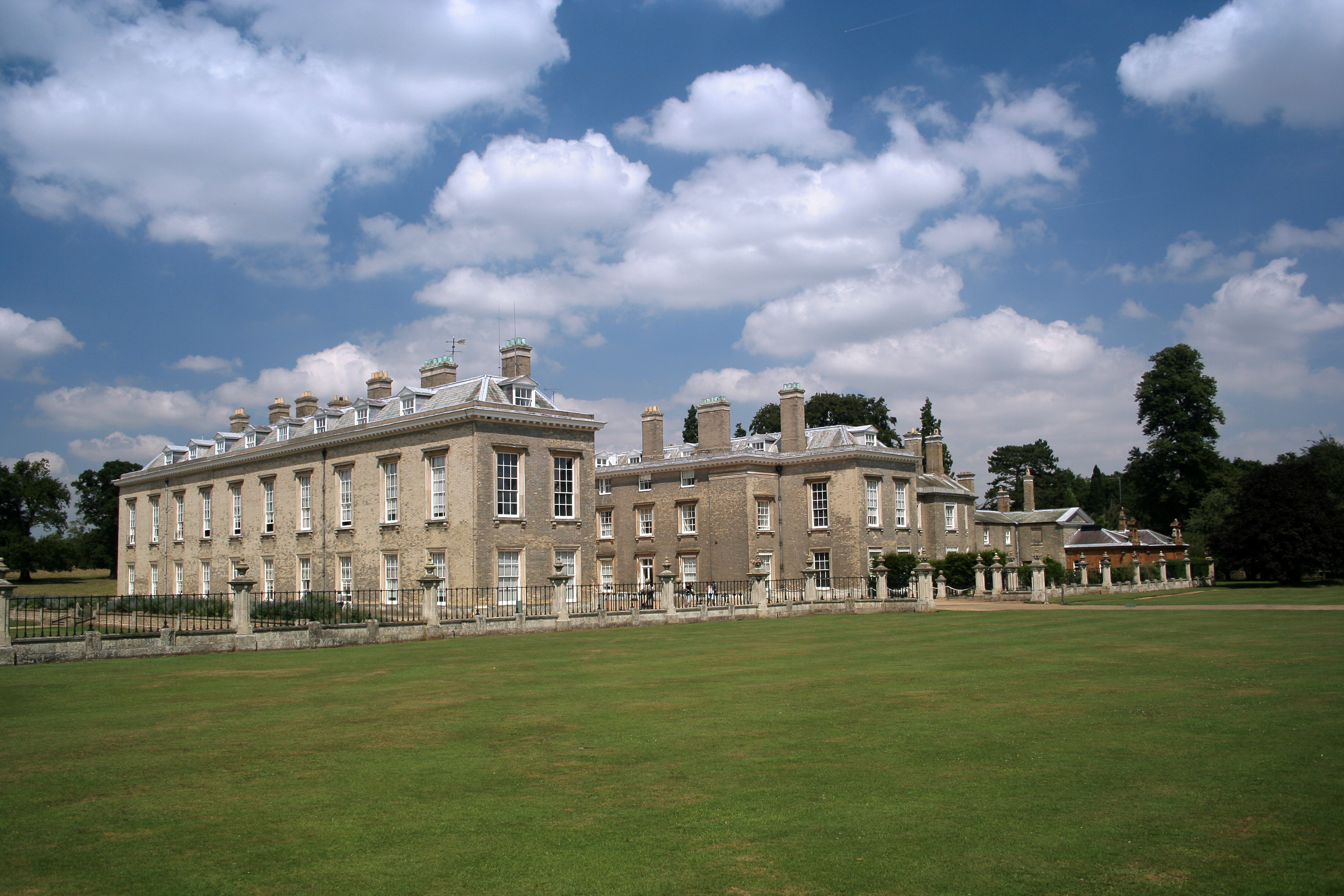
Althorp House in Northamptonshire. Countess Spencer oversaw a large restoration and redecoration project of the Spencers' ancestral home.

Viscount Althorp succeeded his father as the 8th Earl Spencer on 9 June 1975. The Earl Spencer and Raine, Countess of Dartmouth, were married at Caxton Hall, London, on 14 July 1976. As Countess Spencer, Raine was unpopular with her stepdaughter Lady Diana Spencer and her siblings, who referred to their stepmother as "Acid Raine".

In 1978, Lord Spencer suffered a brain haemorrhage; his wife nursed him, and his recovery is credited to her care and devotion coupled with the use of an untested drug. Following her husband's illness, Lady Spencer was widely criticised by the press and conservationists for her redecoration of Althorp, the Spencer family seat; it was felt that the heavy use of new gilding and wallpapers failed to compensate for the missing treasures which included, besides properties and land, works by Sir Anthony van Dyck and Thomas Gainsborough, furniture, china, porcelain, silver, gold, and family documents sold to fund the project and necessary restoration of the house.

The Earl fully endorsed and assisted in his wife's alteration to Althorp and fund-raising activities. However, this was not enough to stop Earl Spencer's son and heir, Charles, Viscount Althorp (later the ninth Earl) from describing his stepmother's taste in decoration as having "the wedding cake vulgarity of a five-star hotel in Monaco."

Lord and Lady Spencer led an opulent lifestyle, entertaining frequently and generously, and travelling greatly. In February 1981, they became globally known following the engagement of Lady Spencer's stepdaughter Diana to Charles, Prince of Wales. The Countess attended their wedding in 1981, but was not seated with her husband: while the Earl and Mrs Shand Kydd and their other children sat opposite the Royal Family, the Countess and Mr Shand Kydd, the bride's step-father, were both seated in the congregation. Countess Spencer did not appear on the balcony of Buckingham Palace following the ceremony. On one occasion in 1989 Diana pushed Raine down the stairs in a fit of anger.

Lord Spencer died on 29 March 1992; the dowager Countess and her former stepchildren had a poor relationship. Just two days later, on 31 March 1992, her former stepson – the new Earl Spencer – threw Raine out of the manor house on Althorp. Raine was not allowed to take a single item unless she could prove that the item belonged to her and all of her staff were fired without notice. Diana stood guard in person in the Spencer bedroom and watched as maid Pauline Shaw put the Countess's extensive clothing in Louis Vuitton suitcases. When Diana discovered the embossed capital letter "S" on the suitcases, she decided that these suitcases also belonged to the Spencers. At Diana's instruction, the maid hastily unpacked the multi-piece designer wardrobe and instead stowed it in black garbage bags. The young earl kicked all of the sacks down the stairs. She received a £4 million inheritance and a townhouse in London's Mayfair from her husband.

== Comtesse de Chambrun ==
In July 1993, Raine Spencer married a third husband, Count Jean-François Pineton de Chambrun (a descendant of the Marquis de La Fayette and a member of a prominent French family related to the American Roosevelt family), after a 33-day courtship. They married in a civil ceremony in London.

The Count, a younger son of Jean-Pierre Pineton de Chambrun, Marquis de Chambrun (a deaf biochemist-artist), was previously married to an American, Josalee Douglas, a niece of US Ambassador to the United Kingdom Lewis Williams Douglas. The Countess again attracted charges of vulgarity in Britain when it was discovered that pictures of the wedding had been sold to Hello magazine for a reputed £70,000. Diana and her siblings did not attend the wedding ceremony. It was at this time that, while none of her former Spencer stepchildren attended this wedding, it was claimed that there was a rapprochement between her and the Princess of Wales.

The Chambruns' marriage was short-lived and the couple were divorced in 1995. Styled since the marriage as Comtesse Jean-François Pineton de Chambrun, Raine chose to revert to her previous surname and style of Raine, Countess Spencer, despite this being against convention.

== Later life and death ==
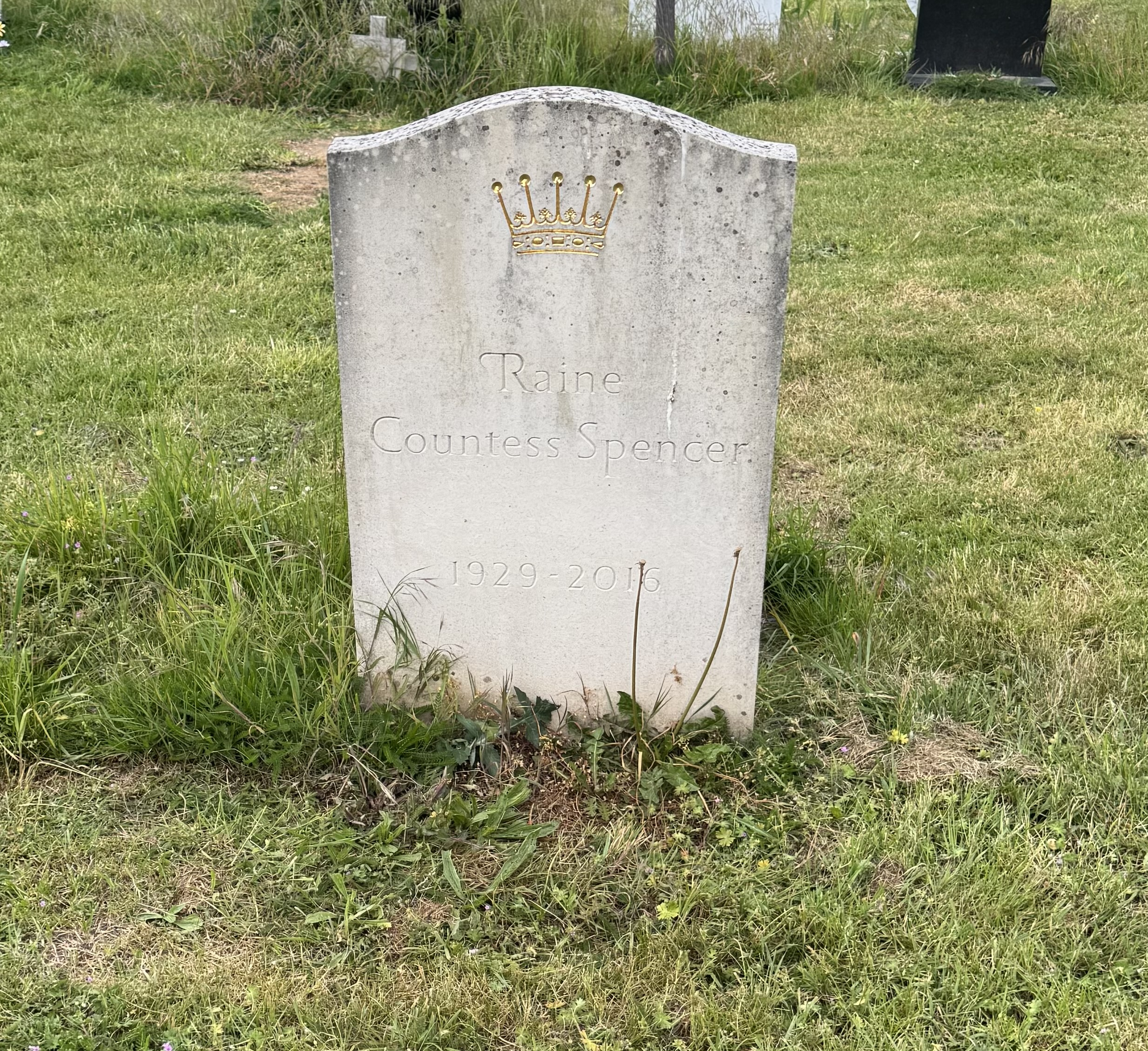
Spencer's headstone in 2026

During Diana's divorce from Prince Charles, she and Raine reportedly reconciled and grew closer, and the two were frequently photographed meeting for lunch. Diana's relationship with her mother Frances Shand Kydd had been strained; Diana and her mother had not communicated for several months before Diana died.

In December 2007, Spencer was again featured in the news, giving evidence at the London inquest into Diana's death. Making a rare public comment on her relationship with her former stepdaughter, she said: "[Diana] always said I had no hidden agenda. So many people, because she was so popular and so world famous, wanted something out of her. It was a very draining life." Later she told the court, "Well, we all want the dark handsome gentleman to walk through the door."

Latterly, Spencer was a member of the board of directors of Harrods, and occasionally worked in the store, although as she told the inquest "Ironically, I never went shopping in Harrods. It was my husband [Earl Spencer] who practically lived there." Her principal home was in Mayfair, London.

On 21 October 2016, Spencer died at the age of 87 following a short illness. No members of the Spencer family attended her funeral. Several months after her death, a selection of her belongings were auctioned off by Christie's, the auction generated £1,905,938 for her family. Spencer is buried at North Sheen Cemetery where in 2021 a headstone was erected.
