= Legg =

Legg may refer to:

== People ==
- Adrian Legg (born 1948), English guitar player
- Andy Legg (born 1966), Welsh footballer
- Barry Legg (born 1949), British former Member of Parliament
- Jenna Legg, English association football player
- John Legg (politician) (born 1975), American educator and politician
- John Legg (footballer), New Zealand footballer
- John Legg (ornithologist) (c. 1765–1802), British ornithologist
- John Wickham Legg (1843–1921), English medical doctor and theologian
- Leopold George Wickham Legg (1877–1962), English academic historian, son of John Wickham Legg
- Shane Legg (born 1973 or 1974), British researcher and entrepreneur
- Sonya Legg, British oceanographer
- Stuart Legg (1910–1988), British documentary filmmaker
- Thomas Legg (born 1935), British senior civil servant

=== Fictional characters ===
- Harold Legg, character on the soap opera EastEnders

== Places ==
- Legg, County Antrim, a townland in County Antrim, Northern Ireland
- Legg, County Fermanagh, a townland in Belleek, County Fermanagh, Northern Ireland
- Legg, West Virginia, unincorporated community

== Other uses ==
- 12075 Legg, an asteroid

== See also ==
- Leg (disambiguation)
- Legge, a surname
