= Earl of Dartmouth =

Title in the Peerage of Great Britain

- Creation date: 5 September 1711
- Created by: Anne
- Peerage: Peerage of Great Britain
- First holder: William Legge, 2nd Baron Dartmouth
- Present holder: William Legge, 10th Earl
- Heir presumptive: The Hon. Rupert Legge
- Remainder to: The 1st Earl's heirs male whatsoever
- Subsidiary titles: Viscount Lewisham; Baron Dartmouth

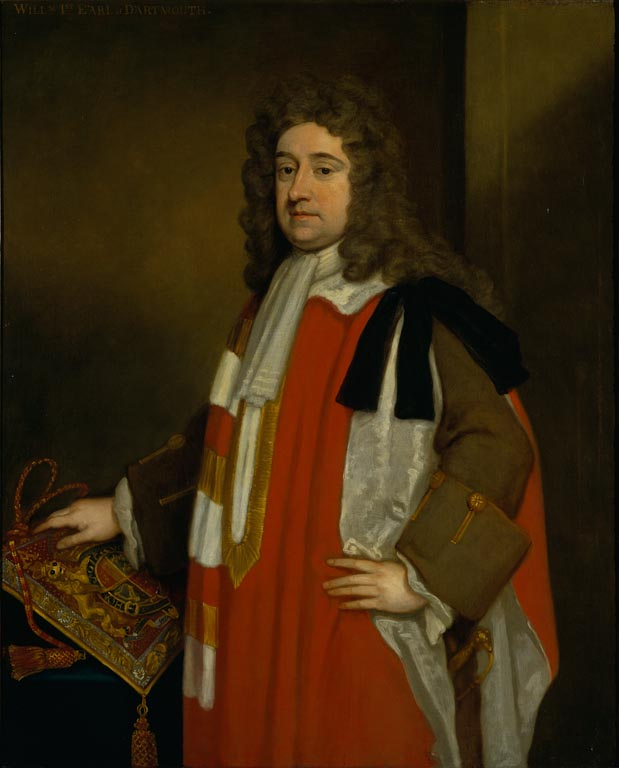
William Legge, 1st Earl of Dartmouth

Earl of Dartmouth is a title in the Peerage of Great Britain. It was created in 1711 for William Legge, 2nd Baron Dartmouth.

== History ==
The Legge family descended from Edward Legge, Vice-President of Munster. His eldest son William Legge was a Royalist army officer and close associate of Prince Rupert of the Rhine. On the Restoration, Charles II offered to create him an earl, but Legge declined.

=== Barons Dartmouth ===
His son George Legge was a prominent naval commander, who in 1682 was raised to the Peerage of England as Baron Dartmouth, of Dartmouth in the County of Devon. George's son William, the second Baron, notably served as Secretary of State for the Southern Department between 1710 and 1713 and in 1711 was created Viscount Lewisham, in the County of Kent, and Earl of Dartmouth, in the Peerage of Great Britain.

=== Earls of Dartmouth ===
William was succeeded by his grandson, the second Earl. He was the only surviving son of George Legge, Viscount Lewisham (d. 1732), eldest son of the first Earl, who had died before his father. He was also an influential politician and served as Secretary of State for the Colonies and First Lord of Trade between 1772 and 1775. The American Ivy League school Dartmouth College in Hanover, New Hampshire, was named for the second Earl by Congregational minister Eleazar Wheelock.

The second earl's eldest son, the third Earl, was summoned to the House of Lords through a writ of acceleration as Baron Dartmouth in June 1801. Soon after, in July 1801, he succeeded his father in the earldom. Lord Dartmouth held office as President of the Board of Control between 1801 and 1802. On his death, the titles passed to his eldest son, the fourth Earl, who had briefly represented Milborne Port in Parliament before succeeding in the earldom.

The fourth earl's only surviving child from his first marriage, the fifth Earl, was a Conservative politician and also served as Lord Lieutenant of Staffordshire. His eldest son, the sixth Earl, was also a Conservative politician and served twice as Vice-Chamberlain of the Household.

The latter was succeeded by his eldest son, the seventh Earl, who married Lady Ruperta, daughter of the 1st Marquess of Lincolnshire. Lady Ruperta inherited a share of the office of Lord Great Chamberlain from her father, and after his father-in-law's death in 1928, Lord Dartmouth acted as Deputy Lord Great Chamberlain until the death of George V in 1936.

The seventh earl's only son, William Legge, Viscount Lewisham, was killed at El Alamein in 1942, and Dartmouth was consequently succeeded by his younger brother, Humphry, the eight Earl.

As of 2018, the titles are held by Humphry's grandson, the tenth Earl, who succeeded his father in 1997. Lord Dartmouth was a Member of the European Parliament for the UK Independence Party between 2009 and 2019, but left the party in 2018, becoming an independent member.

=== Other family members ===
Several other members of the Legge family have also gained distinction. The Hon. Henry Bilson-Legge, fourth son of the first Earl, was a politician and served three times as Chancellor of the Exchequer. Sir Arthur Kaye Legge, sixth son of the second Earl, was an admiral in the Royal Navy. The Hon. Edward Legge, seventh son of the second Earl, was Bishop of Oxford. The Hon. Heneage Legge, second son of the third Earl, sat as Member of Parliament for Banbury. Arthur Legge, fourth son of the third Earl, was a general in the British Army and Member of Parliament for Banbury. The Hon. Augustus Legge, fifth son of the fourth Earl, was Bishop of Lichfield. The Hon. Heneage Legge, sixth son of the fourth Earl, was Member of Parliament for St George's Hanover Square.

=== Family seats ===
The family seat is Blakelea House, near Marsden, West Yorkshire, though there was also a family home at Sandwell Hall (since demolished) in the Sandwell Valley in West Bromwich, and Patshull Hall, near Pattingham, Staffordshire. The district of Dartmouth Park in north London also belonged to the family, and the family also owned land in Lewisham in south London, hence the subsidiary title Viscount Lewisham.

== Baron Dartmouth (1682) ==
- George Legge, 1st Baron Dartmouth (1647–1691)
- William Legge, 2nd Baron Dartmouth (1672–1750) (created Earl of Dartmouth in 1711)

=== Earl of Dartmouth (1711) ===
- William Legge, 1st Earl of Dartmouth (1672–1750)
- William Legge, 2nd Earl of Dartmouth (1731–1801)
- George Legge, 3rd Earl of Dartmouth (1755–1810)
- William Legge, 4th Earl of Dartmouth (1784–1853)
  - George Legge, Viscount Lewisham (1822–1823)
- William Walter Legge, 5th Earl of Dartmouth (1823–1891)
- William Heneage Legge, 6th Earl of Dartmouth (1851–1936)
- William Legge, 7th Earl of Dartmouth (1881–1958)
  - William Legge, Viscount Lewisham (1913–1942)
- Humphry Legge, 8th Earl of Dartmouth (1888–1962)
- Gerald Humphry Legge, 9th Earl of Dartmouth (1924–1997)
- William Legge, 10th Earl of Dartmouth (born 1949)

The heir presumptive is the present holder's brother, the Hon. Rupert Legge (born 1951), whose heir apparent is his son, Edward Legge (born 1986).

=== Title succession chart ===
Title succession chart

Title succession chart, Barons Dartmouth and Earls of Dartmouth.

William Legge; 1608–1670
Baron Dartmouth
George Legge; 1st Baron Dartmouth; 1647–1691
Viscount Lewisham; Earl of Dartmouth
William Legge; 2nd Baron Dartmouth; 1st Earl of Dartmouth; 1672–1750
George Legge; Viscount Lewisham c. 1703 – 1732
Arthur Legge; 1727–1729 | William Legge; 2nd Earl of Dartmouth; 1731–1801
George Legge; 3rd Earl of Dartmouth; 1755–1810
William Legge; 4th Earl of Dartmouth; 1784–1853
George Legge; Viscount Lewisham; 1822–1823 | William Legge; 5th Earl of Dartmouth; 1823–1891
William Legge; 6th Earl of Dartmouth; 1851–1936
William Legge; 7th Earl of Dartmouth; 1881–1958 | Capt. Hon. Gerald Legge; 1882–1915 | Humphry Legge; 8th Earl of Dartmouth; 1888–1962
William Legge; Viscount Lewisham; 1913–1942 | Gerald Legge; 9th Earl of Dartmouth; 1924–1997
William Legge; 10th Earl of Dartmouth born 1949 | Hon. Rupert Legge born 1951
Edward Legge born 1986

=== Line of succession ===
Line of succession (limited to the descendants of the 5th Earl)
- George Legge, 1st Baron Dartmouth (1647–1691)
  - William Legge, 1st Earl of Dartmouth (1672–1750)
    - George Legge, Viscount Lewisham (c. 1703 – 1732)
      - William Legge, 2nd Earl of Dartmouth (1731–1801)
        - George Legge, 3rd Earl of Dartmouth (1755–1810)
          - William Legge, 4th Earl of Dartmouth (1784–1853)
            - William Walter Legge, 5th Earl of Dartmouth (1823–1891)
              - William Heneage Legge, 6th Earl of Dartmouth (1851–1936)
                - William Legge, 7th Earl of Dartmouth (1881–1958)
                - Humphry Legge, 8th Earl of Dartmouth (1888–1962)
                  - Gerald Humphry Legge, 9th Earl of Dartmouth (1924–1997)
                    - William Legge, 10th Earl of Dartmouth (born 1949)
                    - (1) Hon. Rupert Legge (born 1951)
                      - (2) Edward Peregrine Legge (born 1986)
                    - (3) Hon. Henry Legge (born 1968)
              - Hon. Sir Henry Charles Legge (1852–1924)
                - Lt. Nigel Walter Legge-Bourke (1889–1914)
                  - Maj. Sir (Edward Alexander) Henry Legge-Bourke (1914–1973)
                    - William Nigel Henry Legge-Bourke (1939–2009)
                      - (4) Harry Russell Legge-Bourke (born 1972)
                        - (5) Lachlan Legge-Bourke (born 2003)
                    - (6) Heneage Legge-Bourke (born 1948)
                      - (7) Edward Alexander Heneage Legge-Bourke (born 1984)
