= Oona King =

British business executive and former politician (born 1967)

The Right Honourable The Baroness King of Bow
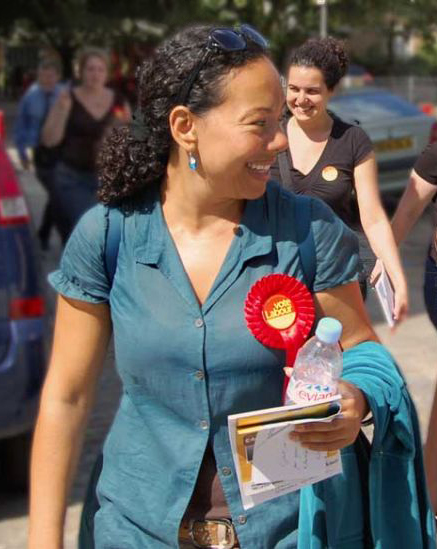
- King in 2010

Member of the House of Lords
- Lord Temporal
- Life peerage 6 January 2011 – 9 July 2024

Member of Parliament for Bethnal Green and Bow
- In office 1 May 1997 – 11 April 2005
- Preceded by: Constituency created
- Succeeded by: George Galloway

Personal details
- Born: Oona Tamsyn King; 22 October 1967 (age 58) Sheffield, Yorkshire, England
- Party: Labour
- Spouse: Tiberio Santomarco (m. 1994)
- Children: 4
- Parent: Preston King (father)
- Relatives: Clennon Washington King Sr. (grandfather); Clennon Washington King Jr. (uncle); Chevene Bowers King (uncle); Miriam Stoppard (aunt); Ed Stoppard (cousin); Ted Graham, Baron Graham of Edmonton (cousin)
- Education: University of York; University of California, Berkeley

Oona Tamsyn King, Baroness King of Bow (born 22 October 1967), is a British business executive and former Labour Party politician. She was a Labour Member of Parliament for Bethnal Green and Bow from 1997 until 2005; and a member of the House of Lords from 2011 to 2024.

== Early life ==
Oona King was born in Sheffield, West Riding of Yorkshire, to Preston King, an African-American academic, and his Jewish British wife, Hazel King (née Stern), a social justice activist. A maternal aunt is the medical doctor Miriam Stoppard and the actor Ed Stoppard is a cousin. Miriam Stoppard was successively married to the playwright Tom Stoppard (from 1972 until their divorce in 1992), and businessman Christopher Hogg (from 1997 until his death in 2021). During these respective periods of marriage, both men were Oona King's uncles. On her father's side, she comes from a line of American civil rights activists and successful entrepreneurs. Her paternal grandfather, civil rights activist Clennon Washington King Sr., and his wife had a daughter and seven sons, including her uncle C. B. King, a pioneering civil rights attorney in Albany, Georgia. King's maternal grandfather was born Jewish, and her maternal grandmother converted to Judaism. Through her maternal grandmother, King is a first cousin, once removed, of Ted Graham, Baron Graham of Edmonton.

King was educated at Haverstock Comprehensive Secondary School on Crogsland Road in Chalk Farm (borough of Camden), London. She was a contemporary of fellow Labour politicians David Miliband and his younger brother Ed.

In her first year as an undergraduate at University of York, King was briefly a member of the Socialist Workers Party. During her second year (1988–89), she gained a scholarship to the University of California, Berkeley and graduated with a first class honours degree in politics in 1990.

== Political career ==
Before becoming a member of parliament, King was a researcher for the European Parliament. She also worked as a political assistant to Glyn Ford MEP, the Labour Party Leader in the European Parliament, and later Glenys Kinnock MEP. In 1995–97, she was a political organiser for the GMB Southern Region.

She was selected to represent the seat of Bethnal Green and Bow early in 1997. Peter Shore had announced his retirement early, but factional fighting in the constituency Labour Party led to party headquarters delaying the selection and imposing its own shortlist. Some leading candidates from the local Bangladeshi community were not included.

=== Parliamentary career ===
Winning the seat in 1997, King became the second black woman to be elected as a member of parliament, the first having been Diane Abbott. In her "truly first-class maiden speech", King described the racial abuse she and her family had suffered as a child. She referred to herself as "multi-ethnic", representing "a truly multicultural constituency where hardship and deprivation gave birth to Britain's greatest social reforms." She described William Beveridge and Clement Attlee as "surrounded by an East End infant mortality rate of 55%" and said this led to social reforms, including the NHS. She emphasised a need for coherence in the strategy for eradicating poverty, and the importance of education in its elimination.

King served on the international development select committee, and as the vice-chair of the All-Parliamentary Group on Bangladesh. She was selected to second the Queen's Speech debate in November 2002, where she also discussed her views on genocide and a visit to Rwanda. King served as the Parliamentary Private Secretary to the Secretary of State for Trade and Industry and the Minister for e-commerce. In 2003 she was selected as one of "100 Great Black Britons".

King supported the 2003 invasion of Iraq, which was controversial for her constituency's large Muslim population. In 2007, King said that she does not regret voting for the war in Iraq, "I could never have voted against getting rid of Saddam Hussein. He was responsible for the deaths of one million people." She had said in September 2005, after seeing how poorly the United States had handled the crisis of Hurricane Katrina and its aftermath in New Orleans, that:

it shows that America has no grasp whatever on the activity needed to rebuild a destroyed city. And if they can't do that in their own country, then it's obvious why they can't do it in Iraq. So ... I regret that we went to war with a country that has shown itself to be incapable of the very basic actions required to deal with post-conflict reconstruction.

=== 2005 general election ===
Bethnal Green and Bow, with a population of approximately 45,000 Muslim residents, was seen as George Galloway's best chance to defeat a Labour candidate in what became a "bitter single issue campaign" over King's support for the Iraq War. King described the contest as "one of the dirtiest ... we have ever seen in British politics" and complained of "quite disturbing" anti-semitic and racial abuse. Galloway said Labour's postal vote strategy in the seat was "close to illegal, if not illegal".

Both candidates were given police protection, King after her car tyres were slashed and Galloway after receiving a death threat. King lost the seat by 823 votes, a 26.2% swing from King to Galloway. King said that, whilst her support for the war in Iraq had been a major issue, false claims in the Bangladeshi press that she wanted to get rid of halal meat had played a part in her defeat.

=== 2005–2009 ===
King had said that she would remain in Bethnal Green and Bow with her constituency office funded from the GMB trade union, attempting to act as an unofficial MP. However, later in 2005, she began a career in the media, saying "I wanted to be an MP all my life, and when it didn't work, I thought, well then, I'll just have to go down a different path." In 2007, King published her autobiography, The Oona King Diaries: House Music.

In 2008, Prime Minister Gordon Brown appointed her to act as his Senior Policy Adviser on Equalities and Diversity and Faith. In January 2009, King was appointed head of diversity at Channel 4. Before relocating to the United States she lived in Mile End, in a converted pub, in the East End of London.

=== 2010 London mayoral campaign ===
In 2010, King unsuccessfully challenged Ken Livingstone for the Labour Party nomination in the 2012 election for Mayor of London. King's first campaign speech, at Haverstock school, focused on "engagement with young people" as a way of reducing knife crime and helping them achieve their potential. In June 2010, she was shortlisted for the nomination. In an interview with The Independent, King emphasised both her experience of "pushing and pulling the levers of power", i.e. her experience of negotiating with top ministers, and also her willingness to work with political opponents.

Her opponent, Ken Livingstone, accused her of using inappropriate methods of obtaining email addresses of Labour Party supporters; King denied the allegation. King had the backing of Neil Kinnock, Ben Bradshaw, and Alan Johnson. On 24 September 2010, Livingstone won the nomination.

=== Peerage ===
On 26 January 2011, King was created a life peer as Baroness King of Bow, of Bow in the London Borough of Tower Hamlets. She was introduced in the House of Lords on 31 January 2011, where she sat on the Labour benches. When her appointment was announced in November 2010, she resigned as a constituency representative to the Labour National Executive Committee, to which she had recently been elected, before attending her first meeting. Upon taking her seat in the Lords, King stood down from her Diversity Officer role with Channel 4. In 2012, King was elected to the Progress strategy board as a parliamentarian.

In 2016, she took a leave of absence from the Lords to take a role as YouTube Diversity Director. In 2019, she left Google to join Snap as their first VP of diversity and inclusion. King was also listed in the annual Powerlist as one of the most influential people of African/African-Caribbean descent in the UK.

In January 2024, King announced that she has left Snap to join Uber as Chief Diversity And Inclusion Officer. She retired from the House of Lords on 9 July 2024.

== Media work ==
King has made appearances on television shows such as This Week, Daily Politics, The All Star Talent Show and Have I Got News for You. She hosted a BBC Two documentary on Martin Luther King Jr. and the deep South entitled American Prophet, aired on 29 March 2008. She made appearances on the new comedic show Jews at Ten on Channel 4, 9 October 2012. In January 2013, she appeared on the ITV skating show Dancing on Ice, being voted off on 20 January.

== Personal life ==
In 1994, King married Italian Tiberio Santomarco, while working for an MEP in Brussels. The couple have adopted three children, and have a fourth child born to a surrogate mother in 2013. She speaks French fluently and some Italian.

Parliament of the United Kingdom
| New constituency | Member of Parliament for Bethnal Green and Bow; 1997 – 2005 | Succeeded by George Galloway |
