= Henry Legge =

Henry Legge may refer to:

- Henry Bilson Legge (1708–1764), English statesman
- Sir Henry Legge (courtier) (1852–1924), Paymaster of the Household to King George V
