= 1960 United States presidential election in Alabama =

- November 8, 1960

All 11 Alabama votes to the Electoral College
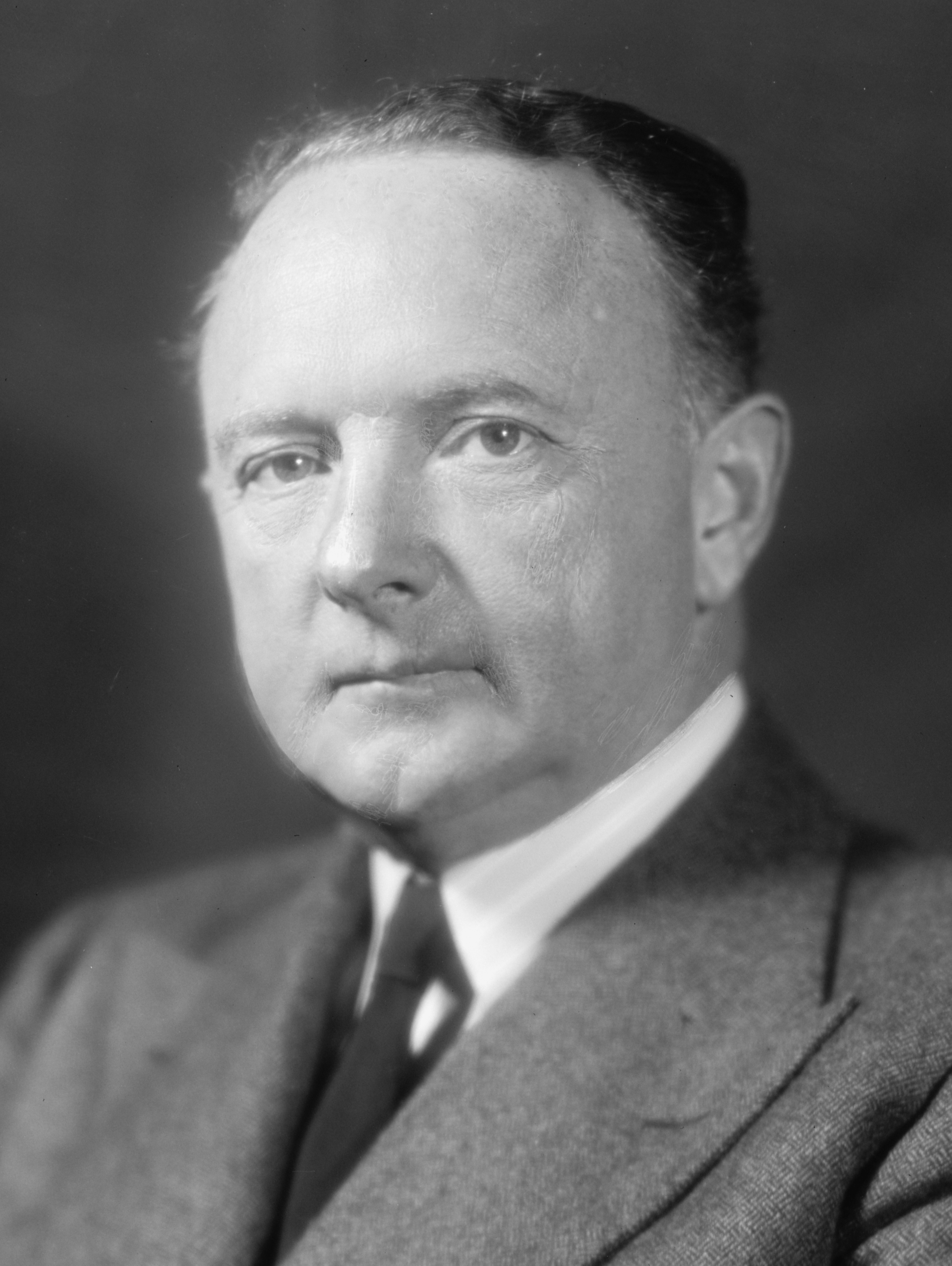

Nominee	Harry F. Byrd (by unpledged electors)	John F. Kennedy	Richard Nixon
Party	Southern Democrat	Democratic	Republican
Home state	Virginia	Massachusetts	California
Running mate	Strom Thurmond	Lyndon B. Johnson	Henry Cabot Lodge Jr.
Electoral vote	6	5	0
Popular vote	324,050 (Note: Most votes won by an individual Byrd elector)	318,303 (Note: Most votes won by an individual Kennedy elector)	237,981 (Note: Most votes won by an individual Nixon elector)
Percentage	56.83%	55.82%	41.73%
County results
Unpledged electors/Kennedy
50–60%
60–70%
70–80%
80–90%
Nixon
50–60%
60–70%
President before election
Dwight D. Eisenhower
Republican
Elected President
John F. Kennedy
Democratic

The 1960 United States presidential election in Alabama was held on November 8, 1960, as part of that year's national presidential election. Eleven Democratic electors were elected, of whom six voted for Senator Harry F. Byrd of Virginia and five for Senator John F. Kennedy of Massachusetts.

In Alabama, voters voted for electors individually instead of as a slate, as in the other states. Twenty-two electors were on the ballot, 11 Republicans and 11 Democrats. Voters could vote for up to eleven candidates. As a result of a state primary, the Democratic Party had a mixed slate of electors, five being pledged to Kennedy and the remaining six being unpledged. The highest vote for a presidential elector was 324,050 votes for Frank M. Dixon, who was unpledged; the highest vote for an elector pledged to Kennedy was 318,303 for C. G. Allen, and the highest vote for a Republican elector was 237,981 for Cecil Durham, which was fewer than the vote for any Democratic elector. As a result, six unpledged electors and five electors pledged to Kennedy were elected. All six elected unpledged electors cast their vote for Byrd.

Varying methods have been used to break down the vote into Kennedy and unpledged votes. One method is to take the 318,303 votes as Kennedy votes and the 324,050 votes as unpledged votes, giving a total much higher than the actual votes cast. Another is to take the 318,303 votes as Kennedy votes and the remainder (5,747 votes, ≈ 1% of the total votes cast) as unpledged votes. A third is to split the 324,050 in the proportion of 5/11 to 6/11, following the proportion of electors, giving 147,295 votes for Kennedy and 176,755 for unpledged electors. In all cases, Republican candidate Richard Nixon of California, then Vice President of the United States, has 237,981 votes. If the last method is used, it means that Nixon won the popular vote in Alabama; it also means that he won the popular vote nationally. Congressional Quarterly calculated the popular vote in this manner at the time of the 1960 election. This remains the last election in which Lee County, Shelby County, Baldwin County, and Mobile County voted for a Democratic presidential candidate. Alabama was one of six states that swung toward Republicans compared to 1956, along with Georgia, Mississippi, Oklahoma, South Carolina, and Tennessee.

== General election results ==
General election results
Party	Pledged to	Elector	Votes	%
Democratic Party	Unpledged (Note: All 6 unpledged electors voted for Harry F. Byrd)	Frank M. Dixon	324,050	56.83
Democratic Party	Unpledged	Bruce Henderson	323,018	56.65
Democratic Party	Unpledged	Edmund Blair	322,593	56.57
Democratic Party	Unpledged	C. E. Hornsby Jr.	322,124	56.49
Democratic Party	Unpledged	W. W. Malone Jr.	322,084	56.48
Democratic Party	Unpledged	Frank Mixell	320,957	56.29
Democratic Party	John F. Kennedy	C. G. Allen	318,303	55.82
Democratic Party	John F. Kennedy	C. L. Beard	318,266	55.81
Democratic Party	John F. Kennedy	J. E. Brantley	317,226	55.63
Democratic Party	John F. Kennedy	Dave Archer	317,171	55.62
Democratic Party	John F. Kennedy	Karl Harrison	316,934	55.58
Republican Party	Richard Nixon	Cecil Durham	237,981	41.73
Republican Party	Richard Nixon	Charles H. Chapman Jr.	237,370	41.63
Republican Party	Richard Nixon	W. H. Gillespie	236,915	41.55
Republican Party	Richard Nixon	J. N. Dennis	236,765	41.52
Republican Party	Richard Nixon	Robert S. Cartledge	236,110	41.41
Republican Party	Richard Nixon	W. J. Kennamer	235,414	41.28
Republican Party	Richard Nixon	Perry O. Hooper	234,976	41.21
Republican Party	Richard Nixon	Tom McNaron	234,856	41.19
Republican Party	Richard Nixon	Mrs. John Simpson	234,002	41.04
Republican Party	Richard Nixon	T. B. Thompson	233,450	40.94
Republican Party	Richard Nixon	George Witcher	230,951	40.50
National States' Rights Party	Orval E. Faubus	George E. Allen	4,367	0.77
National States' Rights Party	Orval E. Faubus	Lodwick H. Bartee	3,775	0.66
National States' Rights Party	Orval E. Faubus	Annette M. Bartee	3,769	0.66
National States' Rights Party	Orval E. Faubus	Lee J. Crowder	3,757	0.66
National States' Rights Party	Orval E. Faubus	Therman De Lee	3,735	0.66
National States' Rights Party	Orval E. Faubus	John Douglas Knowles	3,555	0.62
National States' Rights Party	Orval E. Faubus	Mrs. Lila Evans	3,484	0.61
National States' Rights Party	Orval E. Faubus	Jack Andrew Tomlinson	3,477	0.61
National States' Rights Party	Orval E. Faubus	Ernest Wilson	3,460	0.61
National States' Rights Party	Orval E. Faubus	Sanford D. Rudd	3,396	0.60
National States' Rights Party	Orval E. Faubus	Willie Bazzell Garrett	2,796	0.49
Independent African-American Unity	Clennon Washington King Jr.	Grover C. Allen	1,485 (Note: The votes for electors on this slate were not separated by county)	0.26
Independent African-American Unity	Clennon Washington King Jr.	Marie W. Bailey	1,274	0.22
Independent African-American Unity	Clennon Washington King Jr.	Grover Banks	1,205	0.21
Independent African-American Unity	Clennon Washington King Jr.	Eddie Jones	1,185	0.21
Independent African-American Unity	Clennon Washington King Jr.	Isaac Nicholson	1,154	0.20
Independent African-American Unity	Clennon Washington King Jr.	Ernest Thomas Taylor	1,143	0.20
Independent African-American Unity	Clennon Washington King Jr.	James H. Hollie	1,077	0.19
Independent African-American Unity	Clennon Washington King Jr.	James C. Williams	1,077	0.19
Independent African-American Unity	Clennon Washington King Jr.	Jasper J. Thomas	1,063	0.19
Independent African-American Unity	Clennon Washington King Jr.	James Kersh	1,007	0.18
Independent African-American Unity	Clennon Washington King Jr.	Will Mike	998	0.18
Write-in		John P. Newsome	39	0.01
Write-in		Walter C. Givhan	30	0.01
Write-in		John D. McQueen	30	0.01
Write-in		Lawrence E. McNeil	28	0.00
Write-in		Sam M. Johnson	24	0.00
Write-in		Walter C. Graham	9	0.00
Write-in		Sam W. Johnson	9	0.00
Write-in		Clarence E. McNeil	9	0.00
Write-in		John D. McQueen Jr.	9	0.00
Write-in		John Patterson	3	0.00
Write-in		Sam Englehardt	3	0.00
Write-in		Bill Agee	3	0.00
Write-in		Stanley Pace	3	0.00
Write-in		Matt Lawson	3	0.00
Write-in		Hubert Stewart	2	0.00
Write-in		C. T. Kelley	2	0.00
Write-in		"Red" Waites	2	0.00
Write-in		M. A. Keith	2	0.00
Write-in		Tom Strong	2	0.00
Write-in		Chambliss Keith	2	0.00
Write-in		Harmon Carter	2	0.00
Write-in		Tom McBryde	2	0.00
Write-in		J. B. Stalworth	1	0.00
Write-in		J. W. Staggers	1	0.00
Write-in		Clarence Latham	1	0.00
Write-in		James Murry	1	0.00
Write-in		John Hays	1	0.00
Write-in		H. A. Waites	1	0.00
Write-in		J. E. Hood	1	0.00
Write-in		J. S. Powell	1	0.00
Write-in		Tom Smith	1	0.00
Write-in		James Johnson	1	0.00
Write-in		Bob Brown	1	0.00
Write-in		Tom Anderson	1	0.00
Write-in		J. R. Bennett Jr.	1	0.00
Votes cast			570,225	100

=== Results by county ===
County (Note: All county totals are for the highest elector in each slate.)	John F. Kennedy and unpledged Democratic		Richard Nixon Republican		Various candidates Other parties		Margin		Total votes cast
County	#	%	#	%	#	%	#	%	Total votes cast
Autauga	1,324	52.17%	1,149	45.27%	65	2.56%	175	6.90%	2,538
Baldwin	5,647	53.09%	4,812	45.24%	177	1.67%	835	7.85%	10,636
Barbour	2,148	64.47%	1,166	34.99%	18	0.54%	982	29.48%	3,332
Bibb	1,697	61.66%	1,052	38.23%	3	0.11%	645	23.43%	2,752
Blount	3,404	56.98%	2,557	42.80%	13	0.22%	847	14.18%	5,974
Bullock	757	64.48%	412	35.09%	5	0.43%	345	29.39%	1,174
Butler	2,873	69.69%	1,231	29.87%	18	0.44%	1,642	39.82%	4,122
Calhoun	9,590	65.97%	4,821	33.17%	125	0.86%	4,769	32.80%	14,536
Chambers	5,165	72.74%	1,865	26.26%	71	1.00%	3,300	46.48%	7,101
Cherokee	3,097	77.95%	872	21.95%	4	0.10%	2,225	56.00%	3,973
Chilton	1,798	35.91%	3,201	63.93%	8	0.16%	-1,403	-28.02%	5,007
Choctaw	1,094	60.85%	612	34.04%	92	5.11%	482	26.81%	1,798
Clarke	1,878	47.34%	2,016	50.82%	73	1.84%	-138	-3.48%	3,967
Clay	1,743	52.71%	1,548	46.81%	16	0.48%	195	5.90%	3,307
Cleburne	1,510	59.87%	1,008	39.97%	4	0.16%	502	19.90%	2,522
Coffee	4,470	76.19%	1,381	23.54%	16	0.27%	3,089	52.65%	5,867
Colbert	7,550	71.85%	2,815	26.79%	143	1.36%	4,735	45.06%	10,508
Conecuh	1,815	72.17%	650	25.84%	50	1.99%	1,165	46.33%	2,515
Coosa	1,493	57.98%	1,073	41.67%	9	0.35%	420	16.31%	2,575
Covington	5,744	73.42%	2,047	26.16%	33	0.42%	3,697	47.26%	7,824
Crenshaw	2,923	83.49%	573	16.37%	5	0.14%	2,350	67.12%	3,501
Cullman	6,346	59.87%	4,248	40.08%	5	0.05%	2,098	19.79%	10,599
Dale	2,563	60.76%	1,634	38.74%	21	0.50%	929	22.02%	4,218
Dallas	2,103	41.69%	2,872	56.94%	69	1.37%	-769	-15.25%	5,044
DeKalb	5,844	51.08%	5,585	48.82%	12	0.10%	259	2.26%	11,441
Elmore	3,440	63.60%	1,919	35.48%	50	0.92%	1,521	28.12%	5,409
Escambia	3,990	67.57%	1,810	30.65%	105	1.78%	2,180	36.92%	5,905
Etowah	14,372	66.28%	7,128	32.87%	185	0.85%	7,244	33.41%	21,685
Fayette	2,274	54.08%	1,923	45.73%	8	0.19%	351	8.35%	4,205
Franklin	3,422	45.58%	4,069	54.20%	16	0.22%	-647	-8.62%	7,507
Geneva	3,050	66.90%	1,502	32.95%	7	0.15%	1,548	33.95%	4,559
Greene	723	64.38%	381	33.93%	19	1.69%	342	30.45%	1,123
Hale	1,309	63.54%	741	35.97%	10	0.49%	568	27.57%	2,060
Henry	2,115	77.93%	588	21.67%	11	0.40%	1,527	56.26%	2,714
Houston	3,897	48.61%	4,055	50.58%	65	0.81%	-158	-1.97%	8,017
Jackson	4,789	69.93%	2,036	29.73%	23	0.34%	2,753	40.20%	6,848
Jefferson	44,369	41.90%	60,004	56.66%	1,525	1.44%	-15,635	-14.76%	105,898
Lamar	2,386	70.36%	964	28.43%	41	1.21%	1,422	41.93%	3,391
Lauderdale	8,565	70.10%	3,570	29.22%	84	0.68%	4,995	40.88%	12,219
Lawrence	2,929	68.10%	1,365	31.74%	7	0.16%	1,564	36.36%	4,301
Lee	3,759	61.63%	2,301	37.73%	39	0.64%	1,458	23.90%	6,099
Limestone	4,147	80.59%	991	19.26%	8	0.15%	3,156	61.33%	5,146
Lowndes	796	64.19%	432	34.84%	12	0.97%	364	29.35%	1,240
Macon	1,327	59.53%	877	39.34%	25	1.13%	450	20.19%	2,229
Madison	10,959	66.88%	5,299	32.34%	128	0.78%	5,660	34.54%	16,386
Marengo	1,436	51.45%	1,235	44.25%	120	4.30%	201	7.20%	2,791
Marion	3,099	51.19%	2,938	48.53%	17	0.28%	161	2.66%	6,054
Marshall	6,595	65.94%	3,398	33.98%	8	0.08%	3,197	31.96%	10,001
Mobile	28,626	52.48%	24,608	45.12%	1,308	2.40%	4,018	7.36%	54,542
Monroe	2,130	67.55%	989	31.37%	34	1.08%	1,141	36.18%	3,153
Montgomery	9,421	43.92%	11,778	54.91%	249	1.17%	-2,357	-10.99%	21,448
Morgan	7,822	64.11%	4,357	35.71%	21	0.18%	3,465	28.40%	12,200
Perry	973	54.30%	744	41.52%	75	4.18%	229	12.78%	1,792
Pickens	1,836	58.17%	1,277	40.46%	43	1.37%	559	17.71%	3,156
Pike	3,421	76.91%	1,006	22.62%	21	0.47%	2,415	54.29%	4,448
Randolph	3,175	64.73%	1,697	34.60%	33	0.67%	1,478	30.13%	4,905
Russell	3,480	65.69%	1,770	33.41%	48	0.90%	1,710	32.28%	5,298
Shelby	3,225	50.17%	3,157	49.11%	46	0.72%	68	1.06%	6,428
St. Clair	3,039	53.88%	2,589	45.90%	12	0.22%	450	7.98%	5,640
Sumter	765	52.33%	623	42.61%	74	5.06%	142	9.72%	1,462
Talladega	5,729	54.41%	4,723	44.86%	77	0.73%	1,006	9.55%	10,529
Tallapoosa	5,460	71.39%	2,150	28.11%	38	0.50%	3,310	43.28%	7,648
Tuscaloosa	8,254	58.99%	5,598	40.01%	140	1.00%	2,656	18.98%	13,992
Walker	8,109	59.75%	5,463	40.25%	0	0.00%	2,646	19.50%	13,572
Washington	1,929	69.49%	792	28.53%	55	1.98%	1,137	40.96%	2,776
Wilcox	905	63.51%	513	36.00%	7	0.49%	392	27.51%	1,425
Winston	1,681	32.93%	3,421	67.01%	3	0.06%	-1,740	-34.08%	5,105
Total	318,303	56.39%	237,981	42.16%	8,189	1.45%	80,322	14.23%	564,473

==== Counties that flipped from Republican to Democratic ====
- Baldwin
- Macon
- Mobile
- Shelby
- St. Clair

==== Counties that flipped from Democratic to Republican ====
- Clarke
- Houston

== See also ==
- United States presidential elections in Alabama
- United States presidential elections in which the winner lost the popular vote
