= Heneage Legge =

Heneage Legge may refer to:

- Heneage Legge (died 1759), a Baron of the Exchequer
- Heneage Legge (1788–1844), Member of Parliament (MP) for Banbury
- Heneage Legge (1845–1911), MP for St George's Hanover Square, nephew of the above
