= 2010 London Labour Party mayoral selection =

London Labour Party mayoral selection 2010
- 24 September 2010
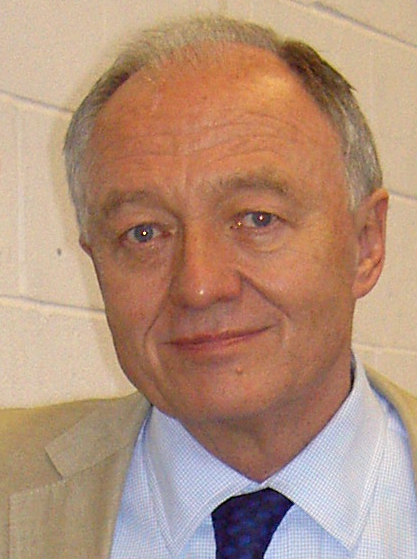

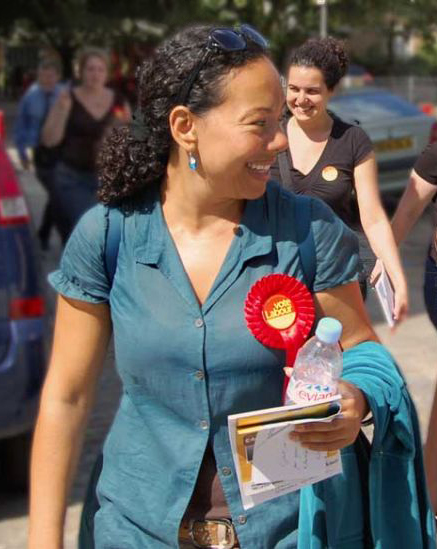
Candidate	Ken Livingstone	Oona King
Overall result	68.6%	31.4%
Party members	66.0%	34.0%
Affiliates	71.2%	28.8%
Elected Mayoral candidate
Ken Livingstone
Labour

The London Labour Party mayoral selection of 2010 was the process by which the Labour Party selected its candidate for Mayor of London, to stand in the 2012 mayoral election. Ken Livingstone, former Mayor of London, was selected to stand.

== Selection process ==
The Labour Party candidate for Mayor was elected by an electoral college composed half-and-half of the votes of Labour members in London and the votes of affiliated organisations. The ballot papers were issued around early September 2010, and the winner was announced on 24 September.

== Candidates ==
- Ken Livingstone, Mayor of London 2000–2008; Leader of the Greater London Council 1981–1986; Member of Parliament for Brent East 1987–2001.
- Oona King, Member of Parliament for Bethnal Green and Bow 1997–2005.

== Result ==
Candidate	Individual members (50.0%)	Affiliated members (50.0%)	Overall Result
Ken Livingstone	66.0%	71.2%	68.6%
Oona King	34.0%	28.8%	31.4%

Source: http://privatewww.essex.ac.uk/~tquinn/london_mayoralty.htm

== See also ==
- 2012 London mayoral election
