= Preston King (academic) =

American academic and activist (born 1936)

- Born: Preston Theodore King; March 3, 1936 (age 90)
- Spouse: Murreil Hazel Stern (m. 1963)
- Children: 3, including Oona King

Academic background
- Education: University of Maryland

Academic work
- Main interests: Civil rights activist

Preston Theodore King (born March 3, 1936) is an American academic and African-American civil rights activist. He taught extensively in universities in the United Kingdom, Africa, Australia and, finally, the United States.

In 1961, King moved to exile in the United Kingdom after having done graduate work there. He was resisting racism by the local draft board in his hometown of Albany, Georgia. He did not return to the United States until he had received a presidential pardon from Bill Clinton in 2000.

== Biography ==
King was born in Albany, Georgia, the youngest of seven sons of Margaret (née Slater) and Clennon Washington King Sr., both of whom graduated from Tuskegee Institute. Preston's elder brothers included Chevene Bowers King, Clennon Washington King Jr., and Slater King.

After earning a Bachelor of Arts from Fisk University, King studied at the London School of Economics in the late 1950s, and at the University of Maryland in 1961. After his draft board learned that he was African American, it addressed him as "Preston" rather than using "Mr." He refused to respond. Accused of draft evasion, King went into exile in the United Kingdom to avoid imprisonment and because he thought the charges unjust. He taught alternately in England and Africa, at Keele University, the University of Ghana, the University of Sheffield, the University of East Africa, and the University of Nairobi (where he was department chair).

In 1976, King moved to the University of New South Wales in Australia, becoming head of his school. In 1986, he returned to the UK, to Lancaster University, where he again chaired his department.

After much resistance in Georgia, he was pardoned by President Bill Clinton in 2000. He had been unable to return to the US for the funeral of his father or of two brothers.

Following his return to the United States from exile after his presidential pardon in 2000, King taught at Emory University and Morehouse College in Atlanta. He has also held numerous visiting positions.

=== Personal life ===
King married British Jewish social justice activist Murreil Hazel Stern, sister of physician Miriam Stoppard, in 1963. Their daughter Oona King (born 1967) is a Labour Party politician and former Member of Parliament. She is now Baroness King of Bow, a member of the House of Lords.

== Selected bibliography ==
=== Books ===
- King, Preston (1974). The Ideology of Order: A Comparative Analysis of Jean Bodin and Thomas Hobbes. New York: Barnes & Noble. ISBN 9780064937108.
- King, Preston (1977). The Study of Politics: a collection of inaugural lectures. London: Frank Cass Publishing. ISBN 9780714630847.
- King, Preston (1996). Socialism and the Common Good: New Fabian Essays. London Portland, Oregon: F. Frank Cass Publishing. ISBN 9780714642550.
- King, Preston (1998). Toleration. London Portland, Oregon: Frank Cass Publishing. ISBN 9780714646527.
- King, Preston (2003). Trusting in reason: Martin Hollis and the philosophy of social action. London Portland, Oregon: Frank Cass Publishing. ISBN 9780714684000.
