= John Legg =

John Legg may refer to:

- John Legg (politician) (born 1975), American politician in Florida
- John Legg (ornithologist) (1765–1802), amateur ornithologist
- John Legg (footballer), New Zealand football player
- John Wickham Legg (1843–1921), English physician and theologian
