= Clennon Washington King Sr. =

American political activist (1891–1975)

Clennon Washington King Sr. (July 1, 1891 – March 20, 1975) was a political activist, Tuskegee Institute student and chauffeur of Booker T. Washington. On August 18, 1918, in Milledgeville, Georgia, King married Margaret Allegra Slater, with whom he had seven sons, four of whom would earn both national and international recognition. He ran two local grocery stores and was a notable figure in Albany, Georgia. He helped to establish the local chapter of the NAACP. In the 1940s, he and his wife Allegra established The Swank Shop, a clothing store in downtown Albany that was moved some years later to another location six blocks away. They had several children including:

- Clennon Washington King Jr. (July 18, 1920 – February 12, 2000) was a civil rights activist and the second African-American to run for President of the United States of America;
- Chevene Bowers King (1923–1988), was a prominent civil rights attorney whose client list included Martin Luther King Jr. Posthumously Chevene had a United States Courthouse in Albany, Georgia named after him.
- Slater Hunter King (July 18, 1927 – 1969) was a successful real estate broker and civil rights leader who helped his father found the Albany chapter of the NAACP;
- Preston King (b. 1936) is a civil rights activist, professor, lecturer and political theorist who was exiled from the United States during the Civil Rights era, but was later pardoned by Bill Clinton in 2000, after 39 years.

His other sons were:

- Marvin Kenneth King (February 27, 1922 – July 27, 2008)
- Paul Dickens King
- Allen Alonzo King

He is the paternal grandfather of Oona, Baroness King of Bow, a former UK Member of Parliament; and Alonzo King, founder of the Lines Contemporary Ballet Company in San Francisco, California.
