= Łęg =

Łęg [wɛŋk] may refer to the following places in Poland:

- A former name for the town of Ełk (north-east Poland)
- Part of the Czyżyny district of Kraków
- Łęg, Pleszew County in Greater Poland Voivodeship (west-central Poland)
- Łęg, Śrem County in Greater Poland Voivodeship (west-central Poland)
- Łęg, Kuyavian-Pomeranian Voivodeship (north-central Poland)
- Łęg, Łódź Voivodeship (central Poland)
- Łęg, Lower Silesian Voivodeship (south-west Poland)
- Łęg, Mława County in Masovian Voivodeship (east-central Poland)
- Łęg, Piaseczno County in Masovian Voivodeship (east-central Poland)
- Łęg, Częstochowa County in Silesian Voivodeship (south Poland)
- Łęg, Lubliniec County in Silesian Voivodeship (south Poland)
- Łęg, Racibórz County in Silesian Voivodeship (south Poland)
- Łęg, Gmina Osiek in Świętokrzyskie Voivodeship (south-central Poland)
- Łęg, Gmina Połaniec in Świętokrzyskie Voivodeship (south-central Poland)
- Łęg (river), a tributary of the Vistula, in Subcarpathian Voivodeship (south-eastern Poland)
