= Miriam Stoppard =

British doctor and author (born 1937)

Miriam Hogg OBE
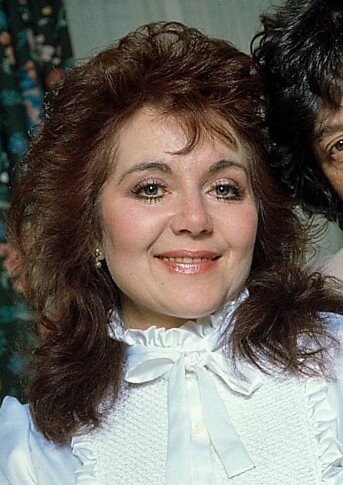
- Stoppard in 1985
- Born: Miriam Stern; 12 May 1937 (age 89); Newcastle upon Tyne, England
- Other name: Miriam Stoppard
- Education: King's College, Durham (Newcastle University)
- Occupations: Doctor, author, journalist
- Years active: 1971–present
- Spouses: Tom Stoppard (m. 1972; div. 1992) Sir Christopher Hogg (m. 1997; died 2021)
- Children: 2, including Ed Stoppard
- Relatives: Oona King, Baroness King of Bow (niece); Preston King (brother-in-law); Ted Graham, Baron Graham of Edmonton (first cousin)
- Website: miriamstoppard.com

Miriam, Lady Hogg (née Stern; formerly Stoppard; born 12 May 1937), known professionally by her former married name Miriam Stoppard, is an English doctor, journalist, author and television presenter.

== Early life and medical career ==
Miriam Stern was born in Newcastle upon Tyne. Her father, Sidney, was a nurse and her mother, Jenny, worked for the Newcastle school dinners service. Her sister is social justice activist Murreil Hazel Stern. Her family was Orthodox Jewish. Her father was born Jewish and her mother converted to Judaism.

Stern grew up on a council housing estate. Her mother was a dressmaker who taught Miriam how to make her own clothing, and from an early age she bought remnants of cloth with her pocket-money. Up until her teens, she fashioned her own designs, complemented with cheap and improvised accessories.

As a teenager she attended school on a scholarship. Inspired by her father, she had early aspirations to become a doctor. Outside of studies she enjoyed music, danced and played table tennis. Stern attended Central Newcastle High School in Eskdale Terrace and trained as a nurse at the Newcastle General Hospital (Royal Free Medical School). She went on to study medicine at King's College, Durham (which became Newcastle University in 1963).

== Career ==
After qualifying as a doctor, Stoppard worked at the Newcastle's Royal Victoria Infirmary and specialised in dermatology as a senior registrar at Bristol Royal Infirmary. She became a research director and then managing director in the pharmaceutical industry for Syntex. She became well known during the 1970s and 1980s as a television presenter on scientific and medical programmes such as Don't Ask Me and Where There's Life.

Stoppard has written several books about health, including the Children's Medical Handbook, but particularly on the subject of women's health. She writes on health issues and acts as an agony aunt for the Daily Mirror, having previously answered readers' letters for TV Times magazine. Her company, Miriam Stoppard Lifetime, sells her books and health products.

Stoppard was appointed Officer of the Order of the British Empire (OBE) in the 2010 New Year Honours for services to healthcare and charity.

In August 2012, writing in the Daily Mirror, Stoppard supported UCL's Institute of Child Health research which suggested reviewing the recommendation of exclusive breastfeeding until six months, adding that the appearance of teeth should signal the end of breastfeeding. She was named Journalist of the Year at the Stonewall Awards.

In October 2026, Stoppard was a guest on BBC Radio 4's Desert Island Discs.

== Family ==
In 1962 she married her first husband Peter Moore-Robinson. From 1972 to 1992, Stoppard was married to the playwright Tom Stoppard, with whom she had two sons. One of their sons is the actor Ed Stoppard. She married the industrialist Christopher Hogg in 1997, and was married to him until his death in 2021. She has two stepdaughters from her second husband's first marriage.

Former MP Oona King is Stoppard's niece; she is the daughter of Preston King and Miriam's sister, Murreil Hazel Stern. Her first cousin was politician Ted Graham, Baron Graham of Edmonton.
