= Cressida Hogg =

British businesswoman

Cressida Mary Hogg CBE
- Born: Cressida Mary Hogg; 27 July 1969 (age 57)
- Education: St John's College, Oxford
- Occupation: Business executive
- Organization: Chair of BAE Systems
- Spouse: Henry Legge KC
- Children: 3
- Parent: Christopher Hogg (father)

Cressida Mary Hogg (born 27 July 1969) is a British business executive, who has served as the chair of BAE Systems since May 2023. In January 2026, Hogg became the new chair of the UK's Confederation of British Industry (CBI).

== Early life and education ==
Hogg was born, on 27 July 1969, the daughter of Christopher Hogg (1936–2021) and Anne Cathie. She studied Philosophy, Politics and Economics as an undergraduate at St John's College, Oxford (BA, 1990), before receiving an MBA at London Business School (1995).

== Career ==
Between 1995 and 2014, Hogg worked at 3i Group plc, ending her career there as managing partner in 3i's Infrastructure Division. From 2014 to 2018, she served as global head of infrastructure at the Canada Pension Plan Investment Board.

She became chair of BAE Systems plc in May 2023, having joined the board as a non-executive director and chair-designate in November 2022. She is the first female chair of the company.

Other board roles have included non-executive directorships at Anglian Water Group (2007–2018), Land Securities Group plc (2014–2023; chair, 2018–2023), Associated British Ports Holdings Ltd (2015–2018), Troy Asset Management Ltd (2018– ), and London Stock Exchange Group plc (2019– ).

In October 2025, Hogg was announced as the new chair of the Confederation of British Industry, assuming the role on 1 January 2026 and replacing Rupert Soames.

According to Companies House, as of May 2026, Hogg has a total of 18 appointments with British companies.

== Personal ==
Hogg married barrister Hon. Henry Legge KC in 1995. Legge is the son of Gerald Legge, 9th Earl of Dartmouth, and Raine Spencer, Countess Spencer. Raine was the daughter of Alexander McCorquodale and the romantic novelist and socialite Barbara Cartland and the stepmother of Diana, Princess of Wales.The couple have three children.

Hogg was appointed CBE in the 2014 New Year Honours list, for services to Infrastructure Investment and Policy.
