= Augusta Legge, Countess of Dartmouth =

English philanthropist

The Right Honourable The Countess of Dartmouth
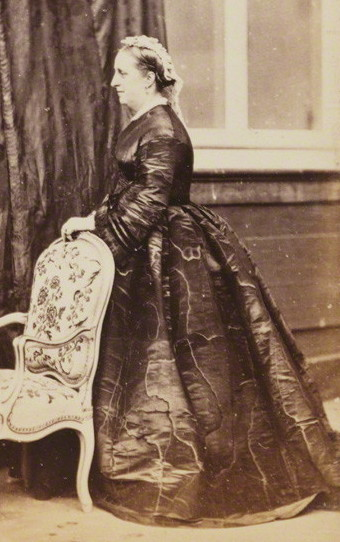
- Born: Augusta Finch; 18 February 1822; Great Packington, Warwickshire
- Died: 1 December 1900 (aged 78); Woodsome Hall
- Spouse: William Legge, 5th Earl of Dartmouth (m. 1846; died 1891)
- Children: 6, including: William Legge, 6th Earl of Dartmouth; Hon. Sir Henry Legge
- Parent(s): Heneage Finch, 5th Earl of Aylesford; Lady Augusta Greville

Augusta Legge, Countess of Dartmouth (née Lady Augusta Finch; 18 February 1822 – 1 December 1900) was an English noblewoman and philanthropist.

She was born at Packington Hall, Warwickshire, the daughter of Heneage Finch, 5th Earl of Aylesford, and his wife, the former Lady Augusta Sophia Greville, daughter of George Greville, 2nd Earl of Warwick.

She married William Legge, 5th Earl of Dartmouth, on 9 June 1846. They had two sons, William Legge, 6th Earl of Dartmouth (1851–1936), and the Honourable Sir Henry Legge (1852–1924), and four daughters, who died unmarried.

In 1853, she founded a Birmingham school in her former residence, Sandwell, when she and her husband moved to Patshull Hall, near Wolverhampton. Laetitia Frances Selwyn ran Sandwell School which was open to girls to train as domestic servants. By the time it closed in 1891 it had extended its range to governesses and even industrial jobs irrespective of gender.

She became a widow and she dedicated herself to good works including founding a local Mother's Union and a home for orphan boys. She crossbred chickens to create the Andalusian Bantam.

She died at Woodsome Hall near Huddersfield in 1900.
