= William Legge, 5th Earl of Dartmouth =

British peer and Conservative politician (1823–1891)

The Right Honourable The Earl of Dartmouth
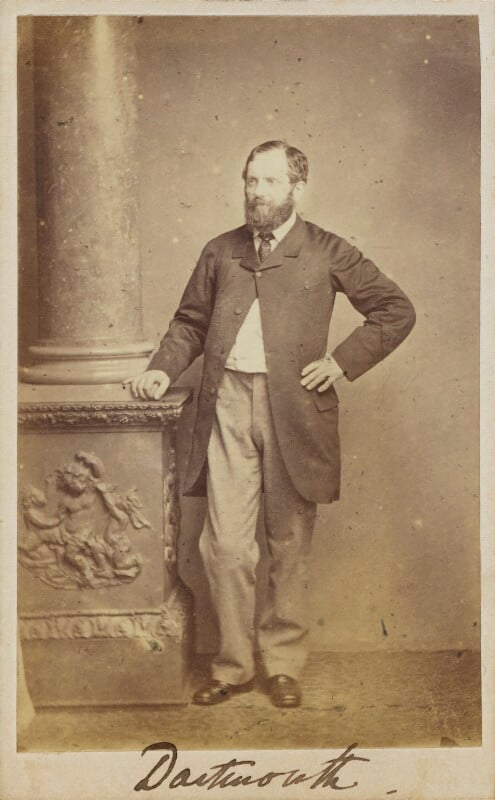
- Dartmouth, 1860s–1870s
- Born: 12 August 1823
- Died: 4 August 1891 (aged 67)
- Children: William Heneage, Viscount Lewisham; Hon. Henry Charles
- Parent: William Legge, 4th Earl of Dartmouth

William Walter Legge, 5th Earl of Dartmouth (12 August 1823 – 4 August 1891), styled Viscount Lewisham until 1853, was a British peer and Conservative politician.

== Political career ==
Legge was elected in 1849 as Member of Parliament (MP) for South Staffordshire and held the seat until 1853, when he succeeded his father William Legge, 4th Earl of Dartmouth. He was appointed a deputy lieutenant of Staffordshire on 9 October 1852, and Lord Lieutenant of Staffordshire in 1887.

== Family ==
The Earl married Lady Augusta Finch, daughter of Heneage Finch, 5th Earl of Aylesford, on 9 June 1846. They had two sons, William Heneage, Viscount Lewisham (1851–1936), and the Hon. Henry Charles (1852–1924), and four daughters, who died unmarried. It was the third intermarriage between the Earls of Dartmouth and Aylesford, as the first Earl had married Lady Anne Finch, daughter of Heneage Finch, 1st Earl of Aylesford and also the third Earl married Lady Frances Finch, daughter of Heneage Finch, 3rd Earl of Aylesford.

He owned 20,000 acres, with most rent coming from 8,000 acres in West Yorkshire.

== Military career ==
He raised the 27th Staffordshire Rifle Volunteer Corps at Patshull on 7 March 1860 during a French invasion scare, and commanded it in the rank of captain.

== Legacy ==
In 1876, land from the Dartmouth estate was leased at Cooper's Hill for the creation of Dartmouth Park; the park was opened to the public by the Earl on 3 June 1878. In 1919, the freehold to the park was awarded to the people of West Bromwich.

== Notes ==
Parliament of the United Kingdom
Preceded by Hon. George Anson; Viscount Ingestre	Member of Parliament for South Staffordshire; 1849–1853; With: Hon. George Anson 1837–1853; Hon. Edward Littleton 1853	Succeeded by Hon. Edward Littleton; Earl of Uxbridge
Honorary titles
Preceded by The Lord Wrottesley	Lord Lieutenant of Staffordshire; 1887–1891	Succeeded by The Earl of Dartmouth
Peerage of Great Britain
Preceded by William Legge	Earl of Dartmouth; 1853–1891	Succeeded by William Legge
