= Chevene Bowers King =

American lawyer (1923-88)

Chevene Bowers King (October 12, 1923 – March 15, 1988) was an American attorney, civil rights leader in Georgia during the civil rights movement, and political candidate.

== Early years ==
Born in Albany, Georgia, King was one of eight children of Clennon Washington King Sr., who graduated in 1916 from Tuskegee Institute, and Margaret (Slater) King, who attended Tuskegee Institute before transferring to Fisk University, a historically Black college in Nashville, Tennessee. Among his six brothers were Clennon Washington King Jr., Slater King, and the much younger Preston King. After he graduated from Monroe High School in Albany, his college years were interrupted by military service in the U.S. Navy from 1943 to 1946.

== Education ==
During his undergraduate years, King majored in industrial arts at Tuskegee Institute from 1941 to 1943, majored in history at West Virginia State College from 1946 to 1947, after serving in World War II and transferred to Fisk University, where received a Bachelor of Arts degree in history in 1949. The following fall, he arrived at Case Western Reserve University in Cleveland, Ohio where he earned his law degree in 1952. During law school, he married Cleveland native Carol Roumaine Koiner Johnson in July 1951. After passing the Ohio bar in 1953, he returned to his native Albany, where he passed the Georgia bar in 1954. He was the only black lawyer practicing south of Atlanta in Georgia.

== National figure ==
As an attorney, civil rights leader, and pioneering political candidate, King spent the rest of his life championing the causes of justice, opportunity, and dignity for all Americans. Despite being based in Albany throughout his career, he emerged as a national figure.

In the early 1960s, he was a co-founder of the Albany Movement, the first major civil rights campaign for Martin Luther King Jr. (MLK) after Montgomery. During the Movement, King (no relation) represented scores of demonstrators including MLK, Ralph Abernathy, Wyatt Tee Walker and Andrew Young. Despite the campaign being charactered as nonviolent in black and white, King faced violence first hand. In late July 1962, Dougherty County Sheriff D.C. "Cull" Campbell struck King multiple times splitting open his scalp with the 76-year-old lawman's walking cane. King was attempting to meet with a jailed demonstrator from Ohio named William Hansen when the sheriff told the lawyer to leave. When King ignored the order, the sheriff said he put him out. The incident including a photo of a bloodied King made the front page of the July 29, 1962 edition of the New York Times. The following August, in 1963, March on Washington organizer John Lewis, noted the incident again, taking to task the Kennedy Administration from the steps of the Lincoln Memorial: "...what did the federal government do when Albany's deputy sheriff beat attorney C. B. King and left him half dead? What did the federal government do when local police officials kicked and assaulted the pregnant wife (C.B. King's sister-in-law) of Slater King, and she lost her baby?"

In 1964, King became the first African-American since the late 19th-century to run from Georgia for the U.S. House of Representatives. In 1970, he was the first African-American ever to run for Governor of Georgia, after being drafted statewide by a delegation of African-Americans who were weighing the possible gubernatorial candidacy of Julian Bond, Leroy Johnson and King. Despite running a distant third behind Jimmy Carter and Carl Sanders, King's candidacy significantly boosted voter registration numbers among African-Americans statewide.

He devoted much of his time to pro bono law work for the poor and to volunteering in community projects for the needy. He was most noted as the lead attorney in a series of landmark lawsuits against longstanding discriminatory practices in the city and the state.

== Legal cases ==
He won cases including Gaines v. Dougherty County Board of Education, Lockett v. Board of Education of Muscogee County, and Harrington v. Colquitt County Board of Education (involving multiple appeals over a period of time to gain full compliance with Brown v. Board of Education in those communities, which accelerated the pace of desegregation in other areas); Anderson v. City of Albany and Kelly v. Page (reaffirming the right of citizens to peaceably assemble); Bell v. Southwell (ending the use of segregated polling booths, voiding an election in which separate booths were used); Brown v. Culpepper, Foster v. Sparks, Thompson v. Sheppard, Pullum v. Greene, Broadway v. Culpepper, and Rabinowitz v. United States (prohibiting use of jury selection lists on which blacks were underrepresented and ending the exclusion of blacks on juries on the basis of race); and Johnson v. City of Albany (ending discriminatory practices in local government employment).

== Death and legacy ==
In 1988, King died in Tijuana, Mexico where he was being treated for prostate cancer following a three-year battle. In 2000, King became the namesake of a federal courthouse.

== Personal life ==
King is also the uncle of Baroness King of Bow, who was the second black female to be elected to British's House of Commons and holds a life peerage to the House of Lords. He is also the uncle of renowned choreographer and ballet master Alonzo King of Alonzo King Lines Ballet.

== Portrayal in the Media ==
King's life was dramatised by David Morley and broadcast by the BBC
