= Legge-Bourke =

Legge-Bourke may refer to:

- Sir Henry Legge-Bourke MP (1914–1973) British Conservative politician
- Dame Shân Legge-Bourke DCVO (1943–2025), Welsh landowner and Lord Lieutenant of Powys, only child of Wilfred Bailey, 3rd Baron Glanusk
- Tiggy Legge-Bourke MVO (born 1965), former royal nanny
- Eleanor Legge-Bourke (born 1980), PR executive and TV personality, a contestant in the 2003 series of Nice People (the French version of Big Brother)

The family name originated with the adoption by Lt. Nigel Walter Henry Legge, of the Coldstream Guards (whose father, Hon. Sir Henry Charles Legge, K.C.V.O., descended from the Earls of Dartmouth), of the additional surname of 'Bourke', by Royal Licence, 26 April 1911, on succeeding to the estate of the Hon. Henry Lorton Bourke, of Hayes, Co. Meath, a descendant of the Earls of Mayo. Henry Lorton Bourke and Henry Charles Legge's wives were both daughters of Gustavus William Lambart (his eldest son was created a baronet); when Bourke and his wife died without issue, his estate was inherited by his nephew.
