= William Legge, 4th Earl of Dartmouth =

British peer

William Legge 4th Earl of Dartmouth
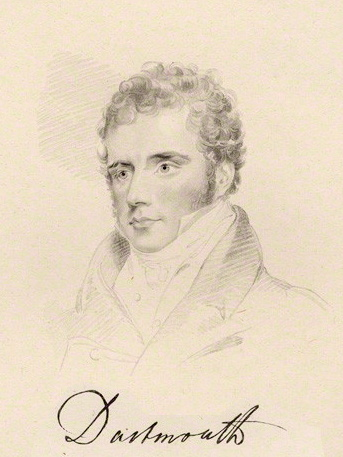
- The Earl of Dartmouth.
- Born: 29 November 1784
- Died: 22 November 1853 (aged 68)
- Parent: George Legge, 3rd Earl of Dartmouth

William Legge, 4th Earl of Dartmouth FRS, SA (29 November 1784 – 22 November 1853), styled The Honourable William Legge until 1801 and Viscount Lewisham between 1801 and 1810, was a British peer.

== Background ==
Dartmouth was the son of George Legge, 3rd Earl of Dartmouth, by Lady Frances, daughter of Heneage Finch, 3rd Earl of Aylesford. Heneage Legge and Arthur Legge were his younger brothers.

== Career ==
Dartmouth was returned to Parliament as one of two representatives for Milborne Port at a by-election in January 1810. However, in November of the same year he succeeded his father in the earldom and took his seat in the House of Lords. He was admitted a Fellow of the Royal Society on 7 November 1822. He was also a Fellow of the Society of Antiquaries.

Like his father before him, Dartmouth served as an officer in the Staffordshire Militia, and was promoted to command it with the rank of Colonel in 1812. He was still colonel of the regiment at the time of his death.

== Family ==
Lord Dartmouth was twice married.

He married firstly Lady Frances Charlotte Chetwynd-Talbot, daughter of Charles Chetwynd-Talbot, 2nd Earl Talbot, on 5 April 1820. They had two sons:

- George (10 June 1822 – 11 October 1823)
- William Walter, 5th Earl of Dartmouth (12 August 1823 – 4 August 1891)

Lady Frances died on 4 October 1823.

Lord Dartmouth married secondly the Honourable Frances Barrington, daughter of Reverend George Barrington, 5th Viscount Barrington, on 25 October 1828. They had six sons and nine daughters. His children by his second wife were:

- Lady Frances Elizabeth Legge (15 September 1829 – 13 March 1922), married on 22 April 1862 George Michell (+ 11 February 1866)
- Lady Louisa Jane Legge (6 November 1830 – 12 February 1910), unmarried
- Hon. George Barrington Legge (19 December 1831 – 9 December 1900), married 9 October 1860 Sophia Levett (1838 – 15 October 1895), with whom he had three sons and three daughters
- Lady Beatrix Maria Legge (13 January 1833 – 11 April 1872), unmarried
- Hon. Edward Henry Legge (23 April 1834 – 16 August 1900), married 15 January 1873 Cordelia Twysden Molesworth (+ 19 March 1915), with whom he had three sons and three daughters
- Hon. Arthur Kaye Howard Legge (24 March 1835 – 08 June 1861)
- Lady Katharine Legge (2 September 1837 – 1 July 1914), married 9 April 1863 Major Robert Jameson Eustace (8 January 1828 – 1 April 1889) and left children
- Lady Florence Legge (3 August 1838 – 27 March 1917), married 11 February 1858 Colonel Nathaniel Barnardiston (24 April 1832 – 12 February 1916) and left children
- Hon. Augustus Legge (28 November 1839 – 15 March 1913), Bishop of Lichfield (1891–1913), married 3 January 1877 Fanny Louisa Stopford Sackville (+ 23 December 1911), with whom he had two sons and two daughters
- Lady Barbara Caroline Legge (January 1841 – 5 January 1909), married 24 November 1875 Reverend Huyshe Wolcott Yeatman-Biggs (+ 14 April 1922) and left children
- Hon. Charles Gounter Legge (9 May 1842 – 15 November 1907), married 2 June 1868 Mary Garnier (26 February 1836 – 13 December 1896), with whom he had five sons and one daughter
- Lady Charlotte Anne Georgiana Legge (29 July 1843 – 19 December 1908), unmarried
- Hon. Heneage Legge (3 July 1845 – 1 November 1911), unmarried
- Lady Harriet Octavia Legge (1 March 1847 – 22 April 1927), unmarried
- Lady Wilhelmina Legge (28 February 1849 – 31 December 1928), married 30 June 1874 John Townsend Brooke (+ 31 January 1899)

The Countess of Dartmouth died on 12 August 1849.

Lord Dartmouth remained a widower until his death in November 1853, aged 68. He was succeeded in the earldom by his only child from his first marriage.

== Other ==
Dartmouth was the litigant in the trust law case of Howe v Earl of Dartmouth (1802) 7 Ves 137.

Parliament of the United Kingdom
Preceded by Hugh Leycester; Lord Paget	Member of Parliament for Milborne Port; January–November 1810; With: Hugh Leycester	Succeeded by Hugh Leycester; Hon. Sir Edward Paget
Peerage of Great Britain
Preceded by George Legge	Earl of Dartmouth; 1810–1853	Succeeded by William Legge
