= Humphry Legge, 8th Earl of Dartmouth =

British peer and police officer

Commander The Right Honourable The Earl of Dartmouth CVO DSO KPFSM
- Born: 14 March 1888
- Died: 16 October 1962 (aged 74)
- Spouse: Roma Horlick (m. 1923)
- Children: 2, including Gerald
- Father: William Legge
- Relatives: William Legge (brother); Joan Legge (sister)
- Military career
- Service / branch: Royal Navy
- Rank: Commander
- Battles / wars: World War I
- Awards: Distinguished Service Order

Humphry Legge, 8th Earl of Dartmouth, CVO, DSO, KPFSM (14 March 1888 – 16 October 1962) was a British peer and police officer.

== Biography ==
Legge was the youngest son of the William Legge, 6th Earl of Dartmouth. During the First World War, he served as a commander with the Royal Navy and was awarded the Distinguished Service Order in 1919 and mentioned in despatches. On 10 April 1923, he married Roma Ernestine Horlick, the eldest daughter of Sir Ernest Horlick, 2nd Baronet. Together they had two children, Gerald Legge, 9th Earl of Dartmouth (1924–1997), and Hon. Heather Margaret Mary (born 1925, married Rognvald Herschell, 3rd Baron Herschell).

In 1932, Legge was appointed chief constable of Berkshire Constabulary after having been assistant chief constable of Staffordshire Constabulary from 1928 to 1932. In the 1946 New Years Honours, Legge was awarded the King's Police and Fire Services Medal (KPFSM). In 1947, he was appointed a Commander of the Royal Victorian Order. He retired as Chief Constable in 1953. In 1958, he inherited his brother's titles and died four years later, being succeeded by his son Gerald.

Peerage of Great Britain
Preceded by William Legge	Earl of Dartmouth; 1958–1962	Succeeded by Gerald Legge
