= William Legge, 10th Earl of Dartmouth =

British politician and hereditary peer

The Right Honourable The Earl of Dartmouth FCA
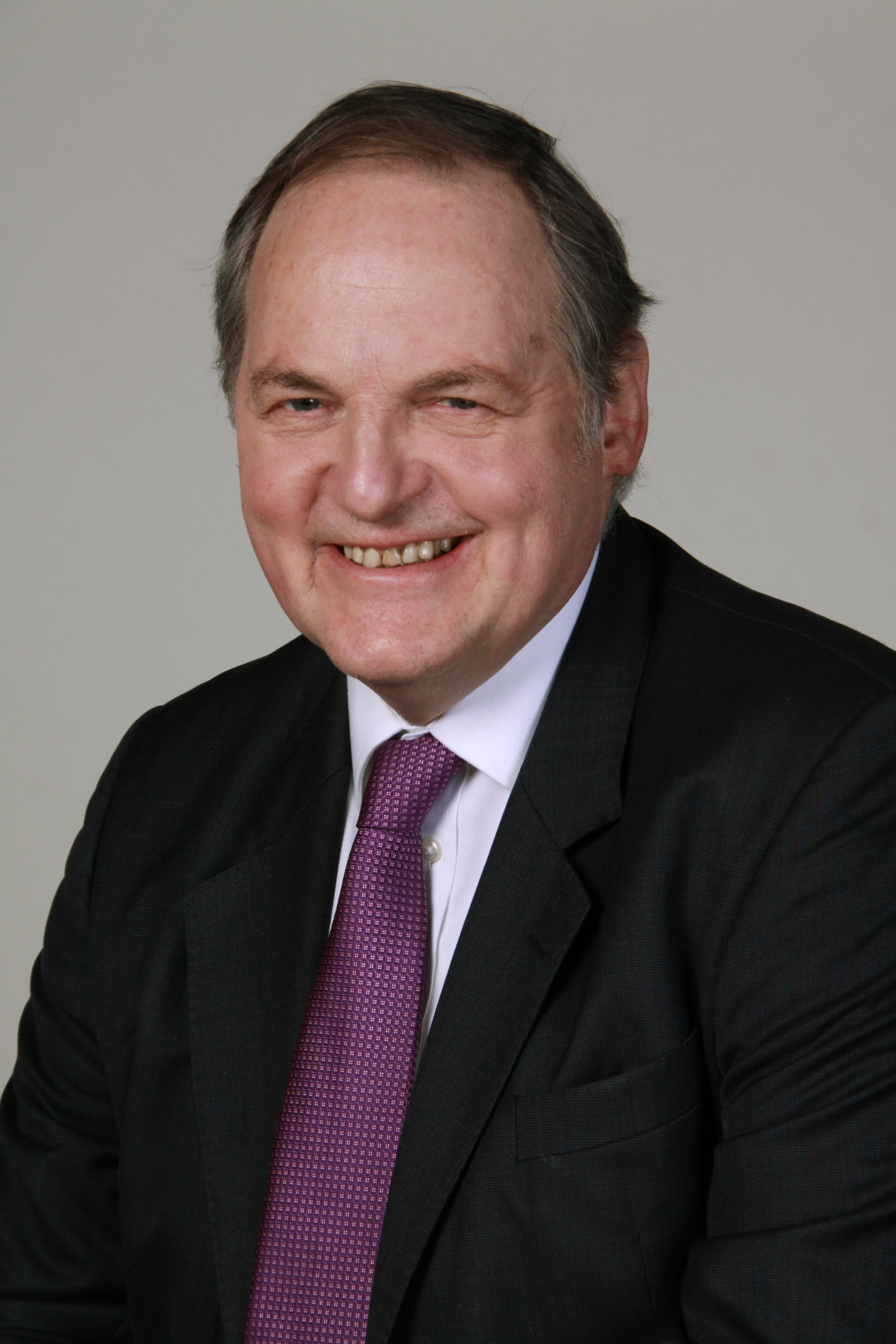

Deputy Chair of the UK Independence Party
- In office 24 February 2016 – 22 January 2018; Served alongside Diane James (2016); Suzanne Evans (2016–2017)
- Leader: Nigel Farage; Diane James; Paul Nuttall; Steve Crowther (acting); Henry Bolton
- Preceded by: Neil Hamilton
- Succeeded by: Margot Parker

UKIP Spokesperson for International Trade
- In office 24 February 2016 – 22 January 2018
- Preceded by: Roger Knapman
- Succeeded by: Vacant

Member of the European Parliament for South West England
- In office 14 July 2009 – 1 July 2019
- Preceded by: Roger Knapman
- Succeeded by: James Glancy

Member of the House of Lords
- Lord Temporal
- In office 14 December 1997 – 11 November 1999 as a hereditary peer
- Preceded by: The 9th Earl of Dartmouth
- Succeeded by: Seat abolished (Note: Pursuant to the House of Lords Act 1999.)

Personal details
- Born: 23 September 1949 (age 77) Westminster, London, England
- Party: Independent (2018–present)
- Other political affiliations: Conservative (before 2007); UK Independence Party (2007–2018)
- Spouse(s): Fiona Campbell (m. 2009) Diandra Luker (m. 2025)
- Domestic partner: Claire Kavanagh
- Children: 1
- Parents: Gerald Legge, 9th Earl of Dartmouth (father); Raine McCorquodale (mother)
- Education: Eton College
- Alma mater: Christ Church, Oxford; Harvard Business School
- Website: williamdartmouth.com

William Legge, 10th Earl of Dartmouth (born 23 September 1949), styled Viscount Lewisham from 1962 to 1997, is a British politician and hereditary peer, usually known as William Dartmouth.

From 2009 to 2019, Dartmouth sat in the European Parliament as a Member of the European Parliament (MEP) for South West England. He was elected for the UK Independence Party (UKIP) and served as national spokesman on trade from 2010 to 2018. He resigned from UKIP in 2018 due to his dissatisfaction with the direction of the party.

== Early life and education ==
Dartmouth is the eldest son of the 9th Earl of Dartmouth and Raine McCorquodale, the daughter of romantic novelist Dame Barbara Cartland. He became a stepbrother of Lady Diana Spencer when in 1976 his mother remarried.

Dartmouth was educated at Eton and Christ Church, Oxford, where he was elected an officer of the Oxford University Conservative Association and of the Oxford Union Society. He graduated BA, later promoted to MA, and proceeded to the Harvard Business School, where he graduated MBA.

== Life and career ==
Dartmouth qualified as a chartered accountant, which was also the occupation of his father Gerald Legge, 9th Earl of Dartmouth.

At the general election of February 1974, as Viscount Lewisham, Dartmouth unsuccessfully contested Leigh, Lancashire, for the Conservatives, and at the election of October 1974 he fought Stockport South for them.

In 1975, he became a Fellow of the Institute of Chartered Accountants. In 1997, he inherited his father's peerages, and as Earl of Dartmouth sat as a Conservative peer in the House of Lords until 1999, when the first Blair ministry's House of Lords Act 1999 removed all but 92 hereditary peers from Parliament. In January 2007, Dartmouth announced he was leaving the Conservatives in favour of the UK Independence Party (UKIP), citing concerns about the policies of David Cameron, then Leader of HM Opposition.

At the European Parliament election of 2009, Dartmouth was elected as the second UKIP MEP for the South West England region and re-elected in 2014, when he was the first UKIP MEP on the regional list. In the European Parliament he sat with the Europe of Freedom and Democracy group (later the Europe of Freedom and Direct Democracy) and served on the Committee on International Trade. In 2010, he became UKIP's national spokesman on Trade and Industry and in February 2016 was appointed as one of the party's two national Deputy Chairmen. He was the author of many UKIP, EFD, and EFDD publications. On 22 January 2018, following UKIP's National Executive Committee vote of no confidence in leader Henry Bolton on the previous day, Dartmouth stood down as trade and industry spokesman, placing further pressure on Bolton to resign.

In September 2018, Dartmouth resigned from the UK Independence Party, citing concerns about the behaviour of the new Leader, Gerard Batten, and complaining that the party was "widely perceived as both homophobic and anti-Islamic". Dartmouth condemned Batten for leading the party towards the far right and denounced his approval of and support for extreme right-wing groups and "outlandish individuals". Dartmouth said he would not be joining another political party and would serve the rest of his term in the European Parliament as an independent, continuing to represent the South West of England and Gibraltar.

== Family and personal life ==
Legge arms

In June 2009, Dartmouth married Melbourne-born former model Fiona Campbell, now styled Lady Dartmouth, whose first husband, Matt Handbury, is a nephew of Rupert Murdoch. They subsequently divorced.

Dartmouth has a son, Gerald Glen Kavanagh-Legge (born 2005), from his previous relationship with the television producer Claire Kavanagh.

In 2025 in Gibraltar he married privately to Diandra Luker, former wife of Michael Douglas.

The heir presumptive to the peerages is Dartmouth's brother, the Hon. Rupert Legge (born 1951), whose heir is his son Edward Legge (born 1986).

== Notes ==
Peerage of Great Britain
| Preceded by Gerald Legge | Earl of Dartmouth; 1997–present Member of the House of Lords (1997–1999) | Incumbent; Heir presumptive: Hon. Rupert Legge |
Peerage of England
| Preceded by Gerald Legge | Baron Dartmouth; 1997–present | Incumbent; Heir presumptive: Hon. Rupert Legge |
