= Crazy Legs =

Crazy Legs or Crazylegs may refer to:

== People ==
- Elroy Hirsch (1923–2004), American football player
- Crazy Legs (dancer) (Richard Colón, born 1966), American b-boy associated with hip hop culture and the Rock Steady Crew
- Ulysses Curtis (1926–2013), running back in the CFL for the Toronto Argonauts from 1950 to 1954
- Crazy Legs Conti (born 1974), competitive eater
- Alex "Crazy Legs" Henderson, a trombonist from the Big Bad Voodoo Daddy band
- Damion Hall, American R&B singer

== Characters ==
- Crazylegs and Crazylegs, Jr., characters (cranes) from the 1978 animated cartoon series Crazylegs Crane
- A character in the 1996 film Don't Be a Menace to South Central While Drinking Your Juice in the Hood played by comic Suli McCullough
- Crazylegs (G.I. Joe), a fictional character in the G.I. Joe universe

== Music ==
- Crazy Legs (album), a 1993 album by Jeff Beck
- "Crazy Legs", a 1957 song by Gene Vincent
- "Crazy Legs", a song by Hed PE from the album Broke
- "Crazy Legs", a song by Cassius from the album 1999

== Other ==
- Crazylegs Classic, an annual 8 kilometer running race named in honor of Elroy "Crazylegs" Hirsch
- Crazylegs (film) (Crazylegs All-American), a 1953 film about Elroy "Crazylegs" Hirsch
- Crazy legs, a colloquialism for restless legs syndrome
