= Legg, West Virginia =

- Unincorporated community
- Location within West Virginia and the United States Legg (the United States)
- Coordinates: 38°29′33″N 81°36′22″W
- Country: United States
- State: West Virginia
- County: Kanawha
- Elevation: 656 ft (200 m)
- Time zone: UTC-5 (Eastern (EST))
  - Summer (DST): UTC-4 (EDT)
- GNIS ID: 1741927

Legg is an unincorporated community in Kanawha County, West Virginia, United States. Its post office is closed.

The community most likely was named after a local pioneer.
