= Gerald Legge, 9th Earl of Dartmouth =

British peer and businessman

The Right Honourable The Earl of Dartmouth FCA

Member of the House of Lords Lord Temporal
- In office 16 October 1962 – 14 December 1997; Hereditary peerage
- Preceded by: Humphry Legge
- Succeeded by: William Legge

Personal details
- Born: 26 April 1924
- Died: 14 December 1997 (aged 73)
- Spouses: Raine McCorquodale (m. 1948; div. 1976) Gwendoline May Seguin (m. 1980)
- Children: William Legge, 10th Earl of Dartmouth; Hon. Rupert Legge; Charlotte, Duchess of Carcaci; Hon. Henry Legge
- Parents: Humphry Legge, 8th Earl of Dartmouth; Roma Ernestine Horlick
- Education: Eton

Gerald Humphry Legge, 9th Earl of Dartmouth (26 April 1924 – 14 December 1997), styled Viscount Lewisham between 1958 and 1962, was a British peer and businessman.

== Background and education ==
Legge was the only son of Humphry Legge, 8th Earl of Dartmouth, and his wife, Roma Ernestine (née Horlick). He was educated at Eton College.

== Career ==
On leaving Eton in 1942, he joined the Coldstream Guards as a captain and served with them until the end of the Second World War, having been mentioned in despatches. He was subsequently a director of the Merchant Bank Rea Bros (based at Kings House, King Street) from 1958 to 1989, chairman of the Royal Choral Society from 1970 to 1992 and chairman of the Anglo-Brazilian Society from 1975 to 1994. He also served as Chairman of the investment holding business, Ocean Wilsons.

== Family ==
Lord Dartmouth married Raine McCorquodale, the only child of the romance novelist Barbara Cartland and her first husband, Alexander McCorquodale, on 1 July 1948. They had four children; William Legge, 10th Earl of Dartmouth (born 1949), The Honourable Rupert Legge (born 1951), Lady Charlotte (born 1963) who married Don Alessandro Paternò Castello, 13th Duke of Carcaci and The Honourable Henry Legge (born 1968) who married Cressida Hogg (youngest daughter of Sir Christopher Anthony Hogg),

Lord and Lady Dartmouth divorced in 1976. Lady Dartmouth later married the 8th Earl Spencer and became the stepmother of Lady Diana Spencer (later Princess of Wales), while Lord Dartmouth married Gwendoline May Seguin four years later. Lord Dartmouth died in 1997 and was succeeded by his oldest son, William.

Peerage of Great Britain
Preceded by Humphry Legge	Earl of Dartmouth; 1962–1997	Succeeded by William Legge
