= David Legge =

Australian rules footballer

Personal information
- Full name: David Legge
- Born: 22 November 1954 (age 71)
- Original team: Haileybury
- Height: 189 cm (6 ft 2 in)
- Weight: 86 kg (190 lb)

Playing career^{1}
Years	Club	Games (Goals)
1974–75	St Kilda	3 (3)
- ^{1} Playing statistics correct to the end of 1975.

David Legge (born 22 November 1954) is a former Australian rules footballer who played with St Kilda in the Victorian Football League (VFL).
