= Czyżyny =

- District of Kraków
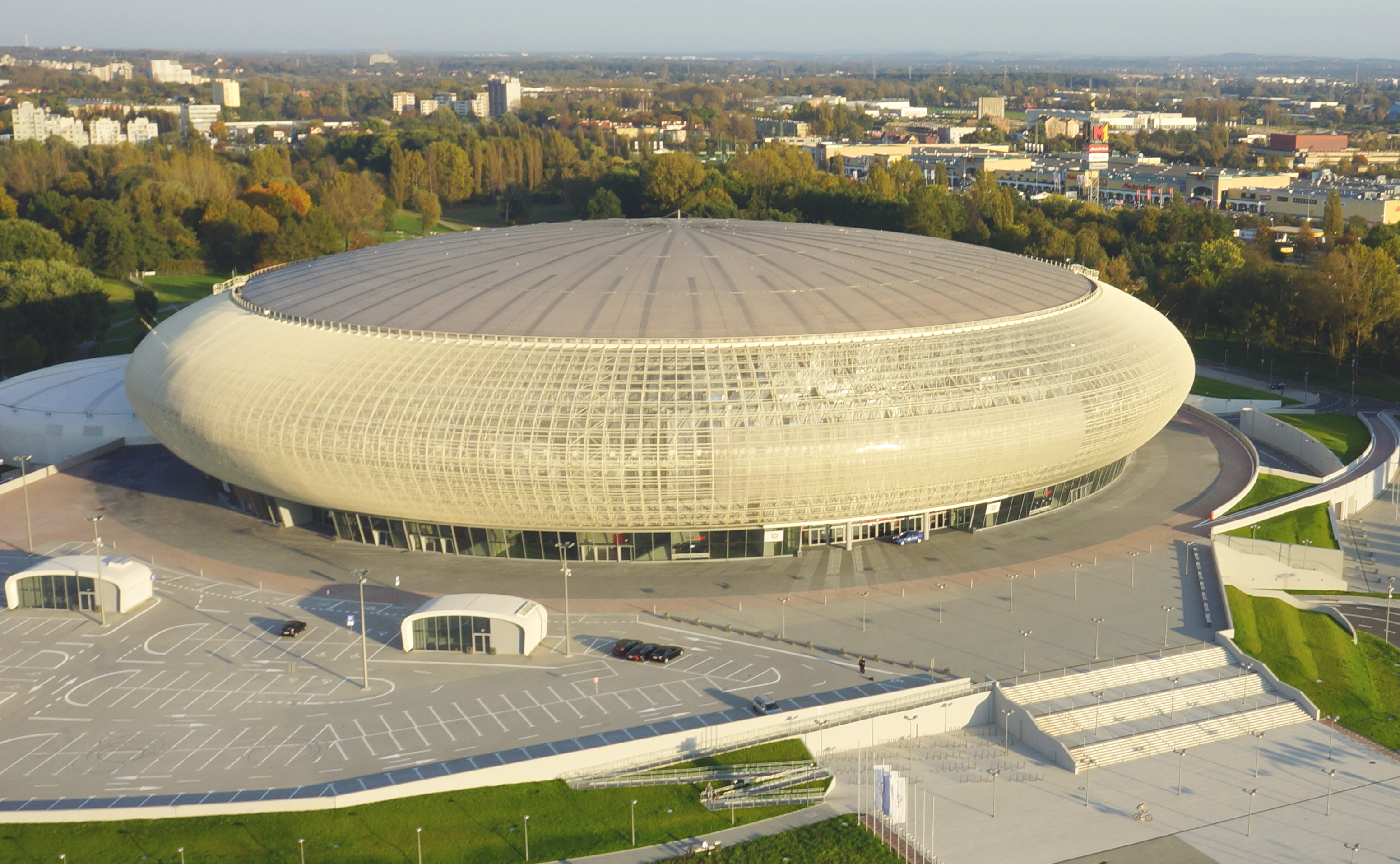
- Kraków Arena

- Location of Czyżyny within Kraków
- Coordinates: 50°3′56.603″N 20°0′31.644″E
- Country: Poland
- Voivodeship: Lesser Poland
- County: City of Kraków
- City: Kraków
- City area: Nowa Huta

Government
  - President: Marek Ziemiański

Area
  - Total: 12.26 km^{2} (4.73 sq mi)

Population (2014)
  - Total: 27,369
  - Density: 2,232/km^{2} (5,782/sq mi)
- Time zone: UTC+1 (CET)
  - Summer (DST): UTC+2 (CEST)
- Postal code: 31-XXX
- Area code: +48 12
- Vehicle registration: KR; KK
- Website: http://www.dzielnica14.krakow.pl

Czyżyny is a neighbourhood and one of 18 districts of Kraków, located in the east-central part of the city. Its name comes from a village of same name that is now a part of the district, and until 1991 the district was part of the then independent city of Nowa Huta.

It home to the Polish Aviation Museum.

According to the Central Statistical Office data, the district's area is 12.26 square kilometres (4.73 square miles) and 27 369 people inhabit Czyżyny.

== Subdivisions of Czyżyny ==
Czyżyny is divided into smaller subdivisions (osiedles). Here's a list of them.

- Łęg
- Osiedle 2 Pułku Lotniczego
- Osiedle Akademickie
- Osiedle Dywizjonu 303
- Osiedle Czyżyny
