= Charles Legge =

Canadian engineer and patent solicitor

Charles Legge (September 29, 1829 – April 12, 1881) was a Canadian civil engineer and patent solicitor.
