= John Legg (ornithologist) =

John Legg (c. 1755 – 1802) was an English amateur ornithologist and early researcher into migration. He has been identified by A C Smith (and this view was supported by Alfred Newton) as the true author of A discourse on the emigration of British Birds, a 1780 work which is perhaps the first to accurately and with some detail outline the modern theory of migration. Smith (1894) tells us that there is little known about his life but provides some details. He was born around 1765 and never married. He lived on his estate near Market Lavington on the northern edge of Salisbury Plain in Wiltshire and wrote. In addition to his more scientific work he also wrote articles for the Lady's Magazine.

In a lengthy footnote to one piece in Lady's Magazine, he announced the forthcoming publication of a two-volume Natural History of Birds, based on his original research. The work was never published, and the manuscript is lost.

== Selected publications ==
- (1780) A discourse on the emigration of British Birds - (also attributed, wrongly according to Smith, and to Newton (reported by Bircham), to George Edwards London, Printed for Stanley Crowder, Bookseller, no. 12, Paternoster-row.
- (1780) Treatise of the Art of Grafting and Inoculation
- (1789) Meditations and Reflections on the Most Important Subjects or Serious Soliloquies on Life, Death, Judgement, and Immortality

== Other sources ==
Smith, A. C. (1894) 'Memoir of Mr John Legg of Market Lavington, an advanced Ornithologist of the 18th century', Wilts Arch. Mag., XXVIII
