= Christopher Hogg =

British industrialist and business executive (1936–2021)

Sir Christopher Hogg FCSD FCGI
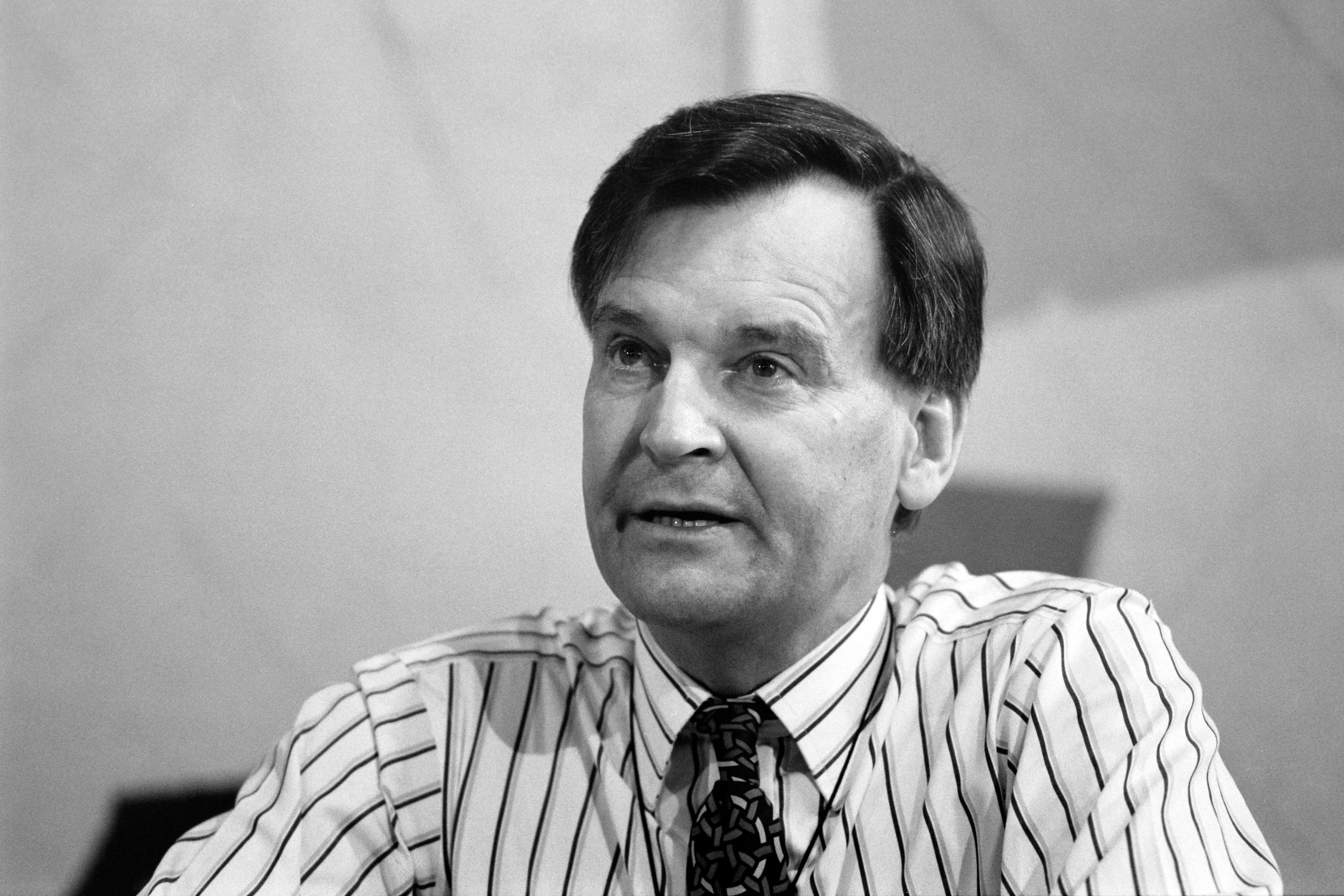
- Hogg in 1993
- Born: Christopher Anthony Hogg; 2 August 1936; Surrey, England
- Died: 7 December 2021 (aged 85)
- Education: Marlborough College
- Alma mater: Trinity College, Oxford; Harvard University; IMEDE Business School
- Occupation: Business executive
- Spouses: Anne Patricia Cathie (m. 1961; div. 1997) Miriam Stoppard (m. 1997)
- Children: 2, including Cressida Hogg

Sir Christopher Anthony Hogg FCSD FCGI (2 August 1936 – 7 December 2021) was a British business executive.

== Early life and education ==
Hogg was born in Surrey, son of Anthony Wentworth Hogg and wife Monica Gladwell. He was educated at Marlborough College and Trinity College, Oxford. He performed his National Service in the Parachute Regiment (1955–1957). Hogg attended IMEDE Business School (Lausanne, 1962), and Harvard University, where he earned his MBA.

== Business career ==
Hogg began his career with Philip Hill Higginson Erlangers Ltd (now Hill Samuel & Co Ltd; from 1963 to 1966). He worked for Courtaulds from 1968 onwards, then Europe's largest textile company. He became a Director in 1973, was appointed Chief Executive in 1979 and became Executive Chairman on 1 January 1980. He retired as Chief Executive in 1991.

He later served as a member of the Department of Industry's Industrial Development Advisory Board from 1976 to 1980. He was a member of JP Morgan's International Advisory Council from 1988 to 2003.

Hogg served as a Non-Executive Director of the Bank of England from March 1992 for a four-year term and a Trustee of the Ford Foundation from 1987 to 1999. He joined the board of Allied Domecq in 1995 and was its Chairman from 1996 until March 2002. He was a Non-Executive Director of Reuters Group from 1984 and its Chairman from 1985 to 2004, and later served as Chairman of the Financial Reporting Council from 2006 to April 2010.

He was a Non-Executive Director of Air Liquide from 2000 to 2005, and of SmithKline Beecham from 1993 to 2000. He was a Non-Executive Director of GlaxoSmithKline from 2000, and its Chairman between 2002-04. Hogg chaired the National Theatre from 1995 to 2004.

Hogg died on 7 December 2021, at the age of 85.

== Awards ==
- Knight Bachelor, 1985
- Honorary Member of the Institute of Chartered Accountants in England and Wales, 2013
- Hon. DSc., Cranfield Institute of Technology, 1986
- Hon. DSc., Aston University, 1988
- Hon. Fellow, Trinity College, Oxford, 1982
- Hon. FCSD
- Hon. FCGI

== Family ==
Twice married, Hogg was married to Miriam Stoppard from 1997 until his death. He had two daughters from a previous marriage, the younger of whom, Cressida, was married to Henry Legge (born 28 December 1968), son of Gerald Legge, 9th Earl of Dartmouth.
