= Arthur Legge (British Army officer) =

British Army general

General Arthur Charles Legge DL (25 July 1800 – 18 May 1890) was a British soldier and politician.

Legge was the fourth son and tenth child of George Legge, 3rd Earl of Dartmouth, by Lady Frances, daughter of Heneage Finch, 3rd Earl of Aylesford. He was the younger brother of William Legge, 4th Earl of Dartmouth and the Honourable Heneage Legge.

Legge was a General in the British Army. He succeeded his elder brother Heneage Legge as Member of Parliament for Banbury in 1826, a seat he held until 1830. He was also a deputy lieutenant of Kent. On 8 May 1868, he was appointed honorary colonel of the 3rd Administrative Battalion of Staffordshire Rifle Volunteers.

Legge was twice married. He married firstly the Honourable Anne Frederica, daughter of John Holroyd, 1st Earl of Sheffield, in 1827. She died in August 1829. He married secondly Caroline, daughter of James Charles P. Bouwens, in 1837. They had at least two children. Caroline died in March 1887. Legge remained a widower until his death in May 1890, aged 89.

Parliament of the United Kingdom
Preceded by Hon. Heneage Legge	Member of Parliament for Banbury; 1826–1830	Succeeded by Henry Stuart-Villiers
