= George Legge, 3rd Earl of Dartmouth =

British politician (1755–1810)

The Right Honourable The Earl of Dartmouth KG PC FRS
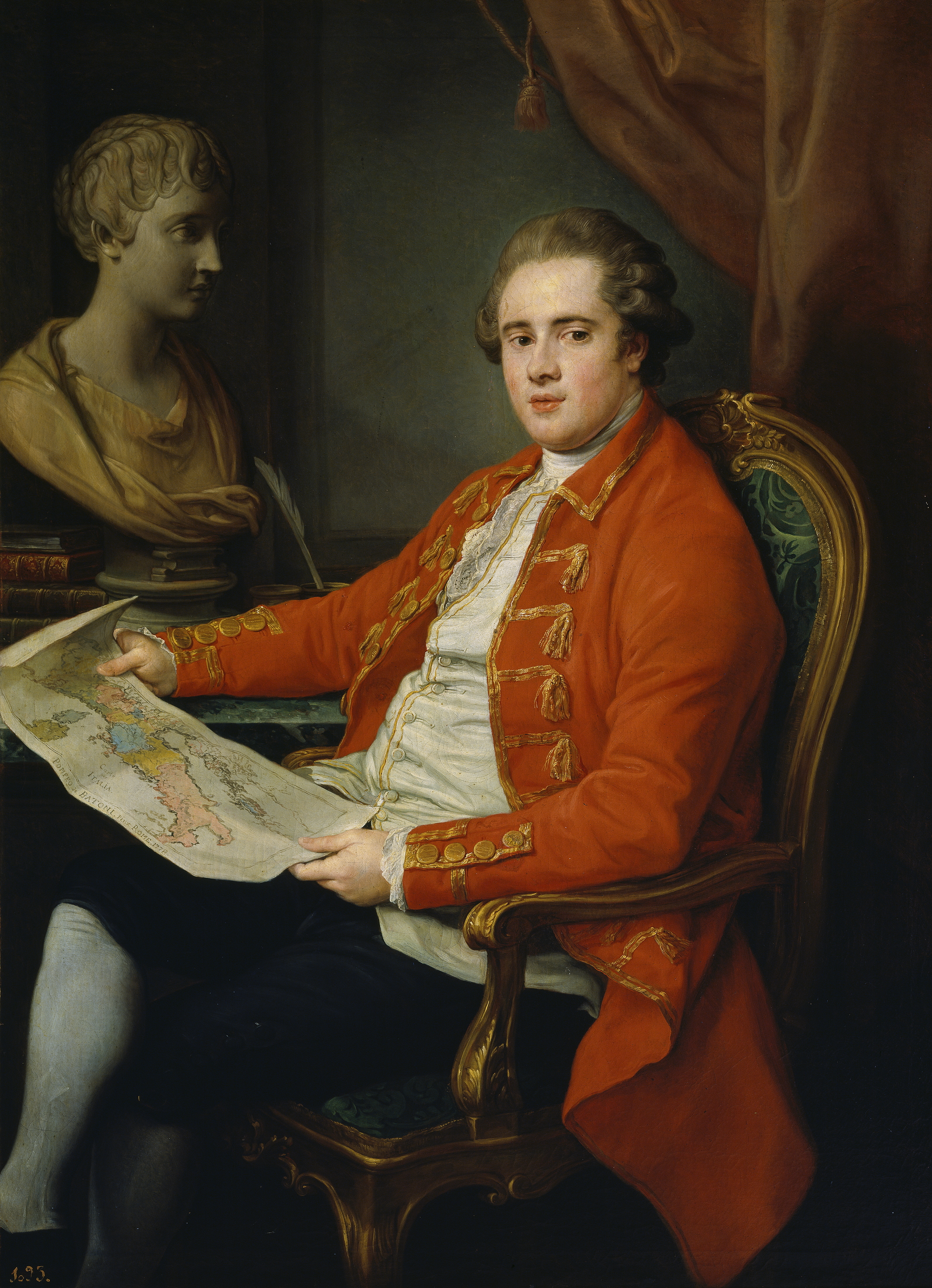
- Portrait by Pompeo Batoni, 1778

President of the Board of Control
- In office 1801–1802
- Monarch: George III
- Prime Minister: Henry Addington
- Preceded by: The Viscount Melville
- Succeeded by: Viscount Castlereagh

Lord Steward
- In office 1802–1804
- Monarch: George III
- Prime Minister: Henry Addington
- Preceded by: The Earl of Leicester
- Succeeded by: The Earl of Aylesford

Lord Chamberlain
- In office 1804–1810
- Monarch: George III
- Prime Minister: William Pitt the Younger; The Lord Grenville; The Duke of Portland; Spencer Perceval
- Preceded by: The Marquess of Salisbury
- Succeeded by: Vacant

Member of Parliament for Staffordshire
- In office 1780–1784
- Preceded by: William Bagot
- Succeeded by: Sir Edward Littleton

Member of Parliament for Plymouth
- In office 1778–1780
- Preceded by: The Viscount Barrington
- Succeeded by: George Darby

Personal details
- Born: 2 October 1755
- Died: 10 November 1810 (aged 55)
- Spouse(s): Lady Frances Finch (d. 1838)
- Children: 15, including William and Heneage

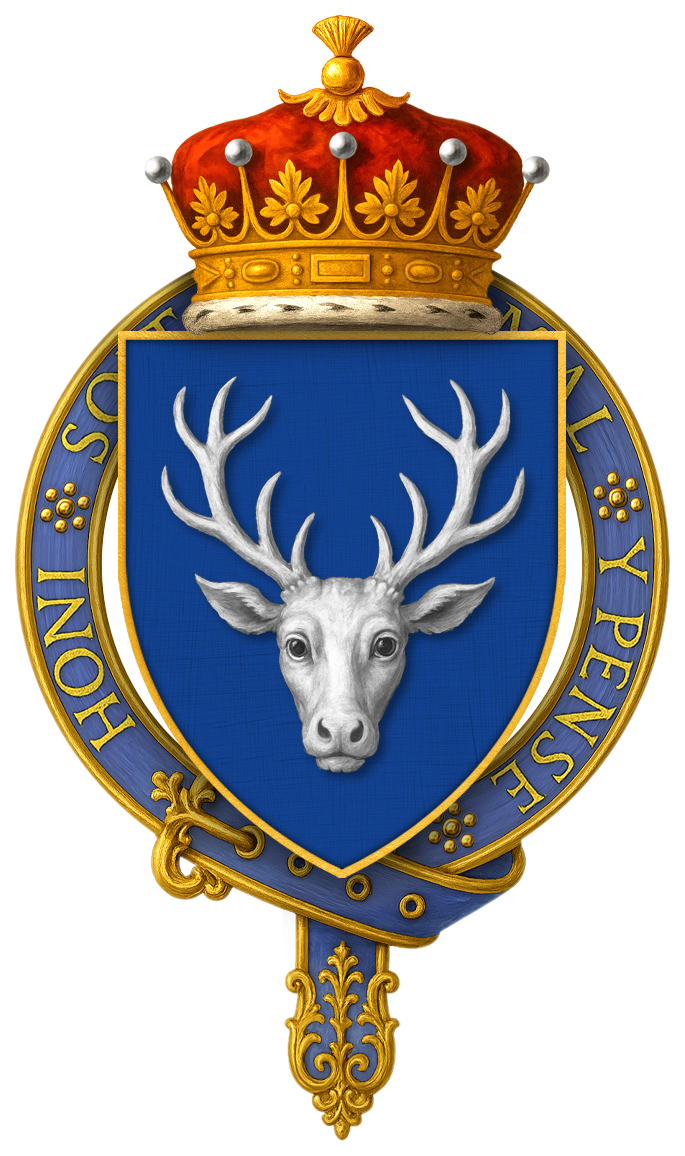
Arms of George Legge, 3rd Earl of Dartmouth, KG, PC, FRS

George Legge, 3rd Earl of Dartmouth (3 October 1755 – 10 November 1810), styled Viscount Lewisham until 1801, was a British politician who sat in the House of Commons from 1778 to 1784.

== Early life ==
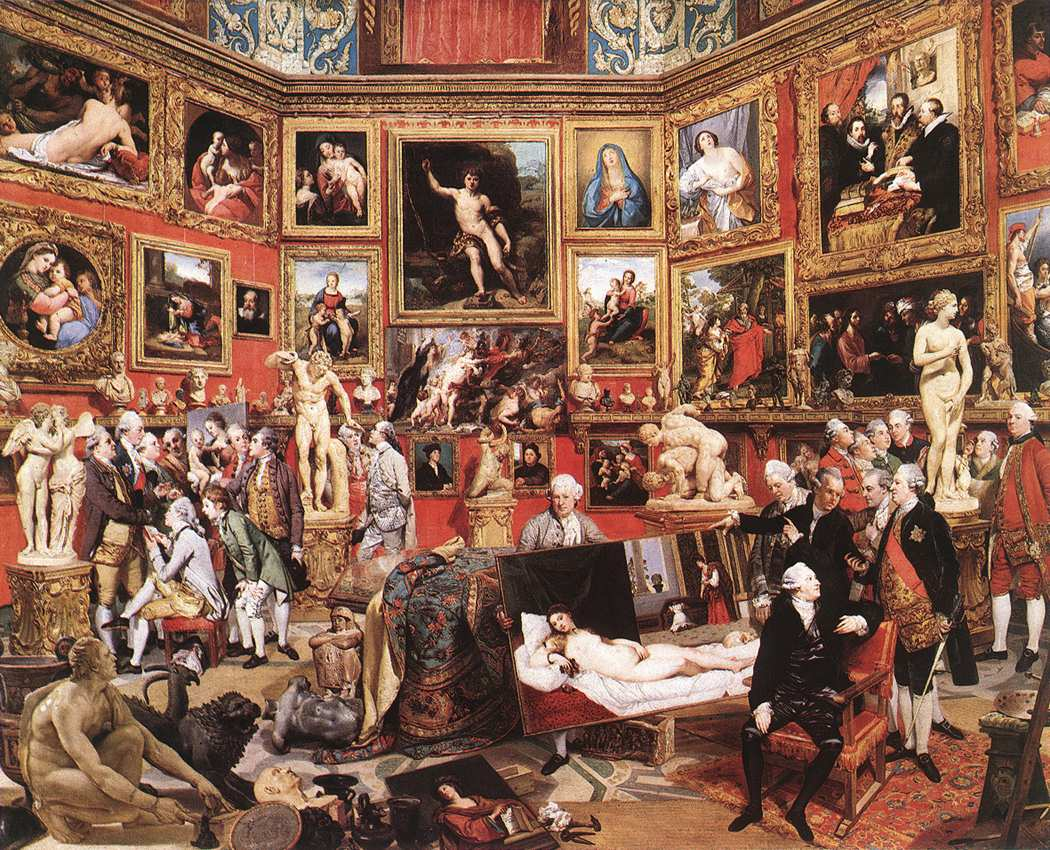
The Tribuna of the Uffizi by Johann Zoffany. Place cursor over artworks or persons to identify them.

George Legge, known from birth as Viscount Lewisham, was born 3 October 1755. He was the eldest son of William Legge, 2nd Earl of Dartmouth, and Frances Katherine, daughter of Sir Charles Gounter Nicoll. He was the elder brother of Admiral Sir Arthur Kaye Legge and Edward Legge, Bishop of Oxford.

He was educated at Eton College and Christ Church, Oxford, where he matriculated 22 October 1771, and was created M.A. 3 July 1775, and D.C.L. 28 October 1778. At some time during the 1770s he went to Florence as he appears in an important painting by Johann Zoffany which the artist titled the Tribuna of the Uffizi.

== Career ==
He was appointed Lieutenant-Colonel of the Staffordshire Militia on 12 March 1779 and took over as its Colonel in 1781. He resigned the command in 1783 when the regiment was disembodied at the end of the American War of Independence. (His son and successor also became colonel of the regiment in 1812.)

=== Political career ===
Lewisham was returned to Parliament for Plymouth in 1778, a seat he held until 1780. In the latter year he was returned for both Horsham and Staffordshire 1784, but chose to represent the latter. He continued to represent this constituency until 1784. From 1783 to 1798 he served as Lord Warden of the Stannaries. He remained out of parliament for the next 17 years, but in 1801 he was summoned to the House of Lords through a writ of acceleration in his father's junior title of Baron Dartmouth. He succeeded his father in the earldom later the same year. Dartmouth served under Henry Addington as President of the Board of Control between 1801 and 1802 and as Lord Steward between 1802 and 1804. From 1804 to 1810 he was Lord Chamberlain under successively Pitt the Younger, Lord Grenville, the Duke of Portland and Spencer Perceval. He was sworn of the Privy Council in 1801 and appointed a Knight of the Garter in 1805. He was also admitted a Fellow of the Royal Society on 3 May 1781 and was the first President of the British Institution in 1805.

== Personal life ==
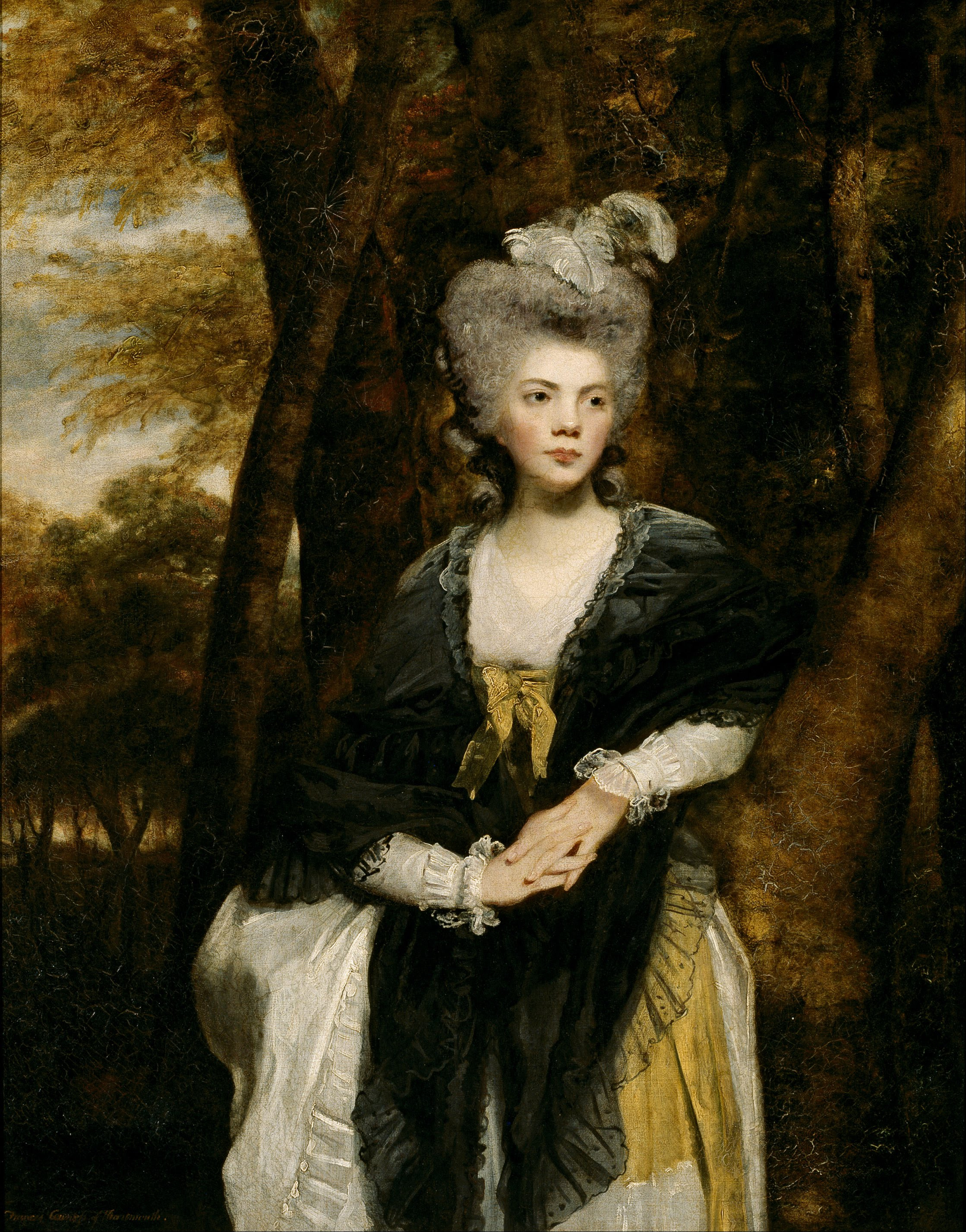
Joshua Reynolds - Lady Frances Finch c. 1781-1782

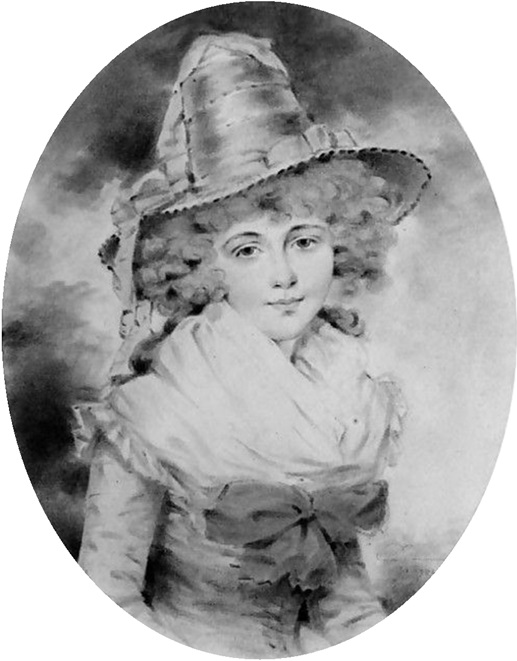
Downman - Countess of Dartmouth c. 1784

On 24 September 1782, Lord Dartmouth was married to Lady Frances Finch (1761–1838), a daughter of Heneage Finch, 3rd Earl of Aylesford. Together, they had fifteen children:

- Hon. Frances Catherine Legge (1783–1789), who died young.
- William Legge, 4th Earl of Dartmouth (1784–1853)
- Hon. George Legge (1786–1789)
- Lady Louisa Legge (1787–1816), who married William Bagot, 2nd Baron Bagot, and had issue.
- Hon. Heneage Legge (1788–1844), who married Mary Johnstone.
- Lady Charlotte Legge (1789–1877), who married the Very Rev. Hon. George Neville-Grenville (Dean of Windsor), son of Richard Griffin, 2nd Baron Braybrooke, in 1816 and had issue.
- Lady Harriet Legge (1790–1855), who married Gen. Hon. Sir Edward Paget, son of Henry Paget, 1st Earl of Uxbridge, in 1815 and had issue.
- Lady Barbara Maria Legge (1791–1840), who married Francis Parker Newdigate in 1820 and had issue.
- Hon. Catherine Charlotte Legge (1793–1793)
- Lady Georgina Caroline Legge (1795–1885), who was a lady-in-waiting to Princess Mary, Duchess of Gloucester.
- Lady Mary Legge (1796–1886)
- Lady Anne Legge (1797–1885)
- Hon. Charles Legge (1799–1821)
- General Hon. Arthur Charles Legge (1800–1890), who married Lady Anne Holroyd, a daughter of John Holroyd, 1st Earl of Sheffield in 1827. After her death in 1829, he married Caroline Bouwens in 1837 and had issue.
- Hon. Henry Legge (1803–1887), vicar of Lewisham; he married Maria Rogers (d. 1890), daughter of Sir Frederick Rogers, 7th Baronet, in 1842.

Lord Dartmouth died on 10 November 1810, aged 55, and was succeeded in the earldom by his eldest son, William. Lady Dartmouth died on 21 November 1838.

Parliament of Great Britain
Preceded by The Viscount Barrington; Sir Charles Hardy	Member of Parliament for Plymouth; 1778–1780; With: Sir Charles Hardy 1778–1780; Sir Frederick Rogers, Bt 1780	Succeeded by Sir Frederick Rogers, Bt; George Darby
Preceded by Lord Grey; Sir John Wrottesley, Bt	Member of Parliament for Staffordshire; 1780–1784; With: Sir John Wrottesley, Bt	Succeeded by Sir John Wrottesley, Bt; Sir Edward Littleton, Bt
Political offices
Preceded by Viscount Melville	President of the Board of Control; 1801–1802	Succeeded by Viscount Castlereagh
Preceded by The Earl of Leicester	Lord Steward; 1802–1804	Succeeded by The Earl of Aylesford
Preceded by The Marquess of Salisbury	Lord Chamberlain; 1804–1810	Succeeded by Vacant
Honorary titles
Preceded by Humphry Morice	Lord Warden of the Stannaries; 1783–1798	Succeeded by Sir John Morshead, Bt
Peerage of Great Britain
Preceded by William Legge	Earl of Dartmouth; 1801–1810	Succeeded by William Legge
Peerage of England
Preceded by William Legge	Baron Dartmouth; 1801–1810 (writ of acceleration)	Succeeded by William Legge
