= Clennon Washington King Jr. =

American politician (1920–2000)

- Born: July 18, 1920
- Died: February 12, 2000 (aged 79)
- Occupation: Politician
- Known for: Second African American man to run for president of the United States
- Parent(s): Clennon Washington King Sr. Margaret Allegra Slater
- Relatives: Chevene Bowers King (brother)

Clennon Washington King Jr. (July 18, 1920 – February 12, 2000) was the second African-American man to run for the office of President of the United States after George Edwin Taylor, and whose attempts at civil rights actions and running for office as a perennial candidate caused him to be nicknamed "The Black Don Quixote."

== Family ==
He was the eldest son of seven. His father, Clennon Washington King Sr., was a civil rights activist, Tuskegee Institute student and chauffeur of Booker T. Washington. His mother was Margaret Allegra Slater. His brother, lawyer C. B. King, posthumously had a United States Courthouse in Albany, Georgia named after him, his brother Slater King was a successful real estate broker, and his youngest brother Dr. Preston King received a pardon from President Bill Clinton, both actions related to their civil rights activism.

== Attempts at integration ==
In 1957, he served as a history professor at Alcorn State University, but controversial letters to the editor and articles by him on the subject of racial integration led to students first boycotting the classes then threatening to boycott the school. School President J. R. Otis was fired as a consequence.

In 1958, King tried to have one of his children integrate an all-white elementary school in Mississippi, which would have been a first, but his wife and children fled. That year he also applied to the all-white University of Mississippi and was committed to an asylum for trying to attend it; his brother C.B. King was able to help free him. Additionally, Clennon King sought the support of Martin Luther King Jr.; they met and MLK later wrote Governor James P. Coleman on behalf of Clennon King. Just two years later, James Meredith became the first black student at that university.

== 1960 presidential campaign ==
In 1960, King ran for president as candidate of the Independent Afro-American Party with Reginald Carter as his running mate, winning 1,485 votes in Alabama, making him (by some accounts) the first African-American candidate for President. He was followed in 1964 by Clifton DeBerry of the established Socialist Workers Party, which had been running presidential candidates since 1948. George Edwin Taylor had previously run for president in 1904 as a write-in candidate.

It's noted that King came in eleventh place of twelve candidates, well behind John F. Kennedy's 34,220,984 votes. However, it was the Constitution Party ticket of Merritt Curtis and B. N. Miller that he beat, but that same party's different ticket of Charles L. Sullivan and Merritt Curtis solely in Texas came in seventh, and the Tax Cut Party ticket of Lar Daly and Merritt Curtis was tenth.

He made two additional attempts for high offices. In 1970 he attempted to join the Republican primary for the 1970 gubernatorial election in Georgia, a race in which his brother C.B. ran and lost to Jimmy Carter in the Democratic primary. King wished to have the fee to be a candidate waived, which it was not, and so sought recourse in a lawsuit and then appeal (ultimately unsuccessful). He stayed in the race as a write-in candidate. He received relatively few votes for governor and then began a new campaign, trying to run once more for president. This time the candidate of his Vote for Jesus Party, he again turned to a lawsuit in an attempt to waive ballot eligibility requirements this time for Delaware, which was again unsuccessful.

== Attempt at integrating Jimmy Carter's church ==
While pastor of the Divine Mission Church in Albany, the night before the 1976 presidential election, King tried to integrate the all-white Baptist church of candidate Jimmy Carter in Plains, Georgia. Rev. Bruce Edwards wished to admit him, but the deacons of the church wanted to uphold the 1965 regulation barring "all Negroes and civil rights agitators"; they closed the church to services and recommended Edwards be fired. Eventually, Edwards resigned. Newspaper stories about the case also reported on King having been convicted for failure to provide child support, something he'd been required to pay since 1960 but had not consistently done.

== Additional campaigns ==
King ran for County Commissioner, City Commissioner and the House of Representatives of the Georgia General Assembly simultaneously in 1979. He was prosecuted for an advertisement placed in the Albany Journal offering "to pay within 30 days after his election $100 in cash to each August 8 voter who punches for him 3 times."

In 1996, King ran for mayor of Miami, Florida where he had moved in 1979 as the candidate of the "Party of God."

== Death ==
Following a career as "Reverend Rabbi" of the non-denominational Church of the Divine Mission he had founded in 1981 in Miami, Florida where he called himself "His Divine Blackness," he died in 2000 after being hospitalized for prostate cancer, leaving a dispute over ownership of the church.
