= Henry Legge (courtier) =

British soldier and courtier

Colonel The Honourable Sir Henry Legge GCVO

Paymaster to the King's Household
- In office 1915–1920

Equerry to the King
- In office 1893–1915

Personal details
- Born: Henry Charles Legge; 4 November 1852
- Died: 20 June 1924 (aged 71)
- Spouse: Amy Gwendoline Lambart (m. 1884; died 1924)
- Relations: Sir Richard Williams-Bulkeley, 13th Baronet (grandson); Harry Legge-Bourke (grandson)
- Children: 2
- Parent(s): William Legge, 5th Earl of Dartmouth; Augusta Legge, Countess of Dartmouth
- Education: Eton College

Colonel Sir Henry Charles Legge (4 November 1852 – 20 June 1924) was a British soldier and courtier.

== Early life ==
Legge was the second son of William Legge, 5th Earl of Dartmouth, and his wife Augusta (née Lady Augusta Finch), and was therefore entitled to the style "The Honourable". He was educated at Eton College.

== Career ==
Legge was commissioned into the Coldstream Guards in 1872 and retired from the Army in 1899. He served as an equerry in the Royal Household from 1893 to 1915, when he became Paymaster to the King's Household and an extra equerry to the king. He retired in 1920.

He was appointed Knight Commander of the Royal Victorian Order (KCVO) in 1910 and Knight Grand Cross of the Royal Victorian Order (GCVO) in the 1920 Birthday Honours. He received the 2nd class of the Prussian Order of the Crown in January 1903.

== Personal life ==
Legge married Amy Gwendoline Lambart (1852–1927) in 1884. They had two children:

- Victoria "Vita" Alexandrina Stella Legge (1885–1965), who married Major Richard Gerard Wellesley Williams-Bulkeley (1887–1918), son of Sir Richard Henry Williams-Bulkeley, 12th Baronet, in 1909. After his death, Vita married Roland Frank Holdway Norman in 1921.
- Nigel Walter Henry Legge (1889–1914), who legally changed his name to Nigel Walter Henry Legge-Bourke by royal licence on 26 April 1911; he married Lady Victoria Alexandrina Wynn-Carington (1892–1966), daughter of Charles Wynn-Carington, 1st Marquess of Lincolnshire, in 1913. He was killed in action in World War I in October 1914.

Sir Henry died on 20 June 1924.

=== Descendants ===
Through his daughter Vita, he was a grandfather of three. His elder grandson, Richard Harry David Williams-Bulkeley, succeeded his paternal grandfather as the 13th Baronet. The younger grandson, David, died in South Africa in 1937, aged 21, in mysterious circumstances. The granddaughter, Sylvia, married Eustace Clearey. From Vita's second marriage, he had another grandson, Robert Norman, who was educated at Eton and was killed in action in 1944.

Through his son Nigel, he was a grandfather of Sir Harry Legge-Bourke, whose granddaughters are cousins Tiggy and Eleanor Legge-Bourke.
