= Heneage Legge (1788–1844) =

British Member of Parliament

The Honourable Heneage Legge (29 February 1788 – 12 December 1844), was a British Member of Parliament.

Legge was the second son of George Legge, 3rd Earl of Dartmouth, by Lady Frances Finch, daughter of Heneage Finch, 3rd Earl of Aylesford. William Legge, 4th Earl of Dartmouth, and General the Hon. Arthur Legge were his brothers.

Legge was returned to parliament for Banbury in 1819, a seat he held until 1826, when he was succeeded by his younger brother, Arthur. He also served as a Commissioner of Customs.

Legge married Mary (née Johnstone) in 1821. He died in December 1844, aged 56. His wife survived him by four years and died in June 1848.

Parliament of the United Kingdom
Preceded by Frederick Douglas	Member of Parliament for Banbury; 1819–1826	Succeeded by Hon. Arthur Legge
