= Christopher Tugendhat, Baron Tugendhat =

British politician, life peer (born 1937)

The Right Honourable The Lord Tugendhat
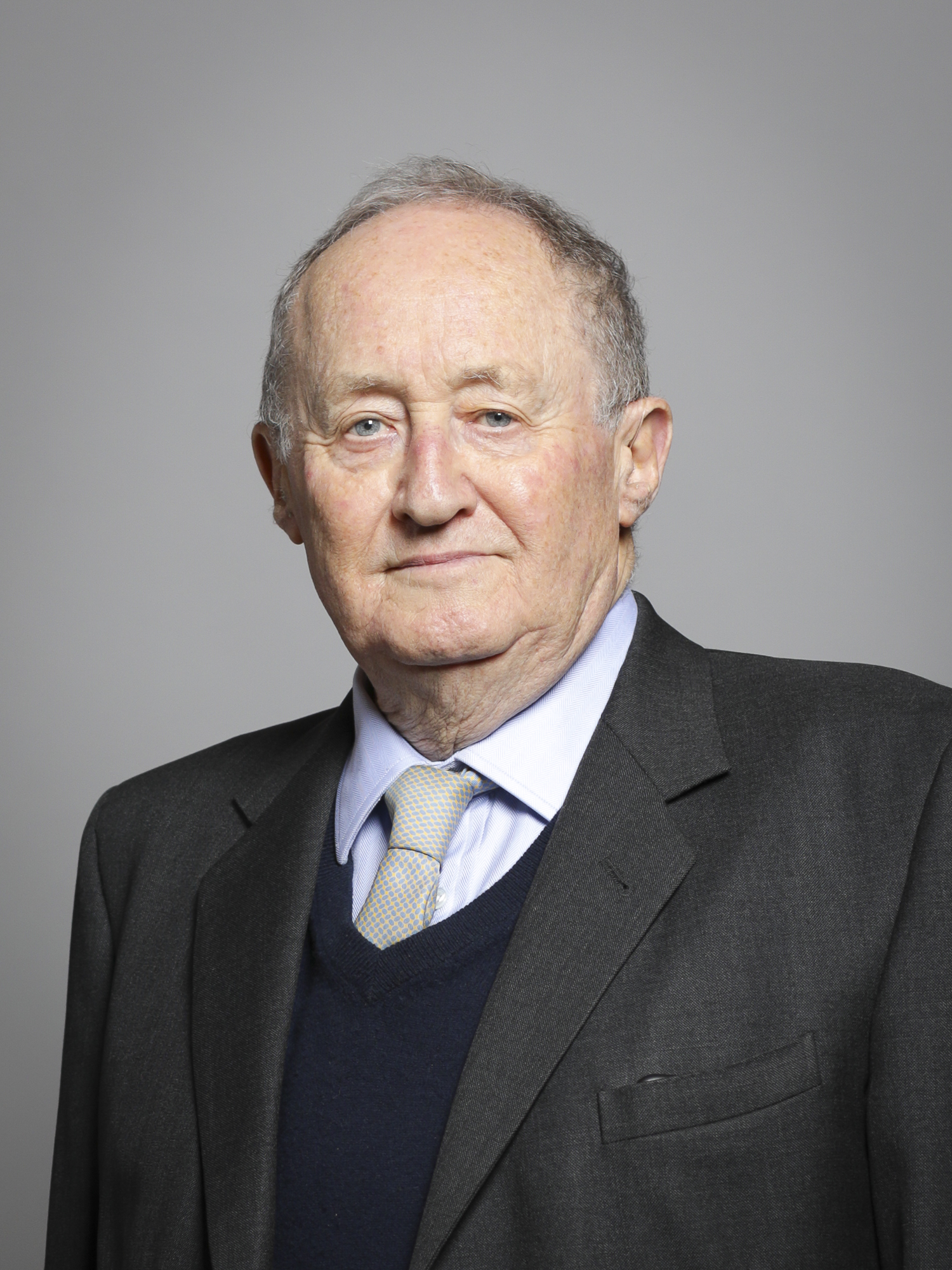
- Official portrait, 2020

Chancellor of the University of Bath
- In office 1998–2013
- Vice-Chancellor: David VandeLinde; Glynis Breakwell
- Preceded by: Sir Denys Henderson
- Succeeded by: Prince Edward, Duke of Edinburgh

First Vice-President of the European Commission
- In office 6 January 1981 – 5 January 1985
- President: Gaston Thorn
- Preceded by: François-Xavier Ortoli
- Succeeded by: Frans Andriessen

European Commissioner for Budget & Financial Control and Financial Institutions
- In office 1977–1985
- President: Roy Jenkins; Gaston Thorn
- Preceded by: Wilhelm Haferkamp
- Succeeded by: Henning Christophersen

Member of Parliament for City of London and Westminster South Cities of London and Westminster (1970–1974)
- In office 18 June 1970 – 24 February 1977
- Preceded by: John Smith
- Succeeded by: Peter Brooke

Member of the House of Lords
- Lord Temporal
- Life peerage 15 October 1993

Personal details
- Born: Christopher Samuel Tugendhat; 23 February 1937 (age 89) Marylebone, England
- Party: Conservative
- Spouse: Julia Lissant née Dobson
- Children: 2
- Parents: Dr Georg Tugendhat (1898–1973) (father); Máire Tugendhat née Littledale (mother)
- Relatives: Michael Tugendhat (brother); Thomas Tugendhat (nephew)
- Education: KCS Cambridge; Ampleforth
- Alma mater: Gonville and Caius College, Cambridge
- Occupation: Author; company director; politician
- Profession: Business; journalism
- Awards: Knight Bachelor (1990); Life Peer (1993)

Christopher Samuel Tugendhat, Baron Tugendhat (born 23 February 1937), is a British politician, businessman, journalist and author. A member of the Conservative Party, he first served as a Member of Parliament (MP) from 1970 to 1977, when he was appointed to the European Commission, of which he served from 1981 until 1985 as its First Vice-President. Lord Tugendhat entered the House of Lords in 1993, where he sits as a life peer.

== Family background ==
Tugendhat was born at Marylebone, Middlesex. His father, Dr Georg Tugendhat (1898–1973), who was born in Vienna, came to Britain after the First World War to pursue a doctorate at the London School of Economics, marrying Marie Littledale in 1934.

Dr Georg Tugendhat traced his paternal origins to the town of Bielitz in Silesia, which until 1918 was part of the Austro-Hungarian Empire, becoming part of Poland in 1920. His father hailed from a prosperous Jewish family, and converted to Catholicism.

== Career ==
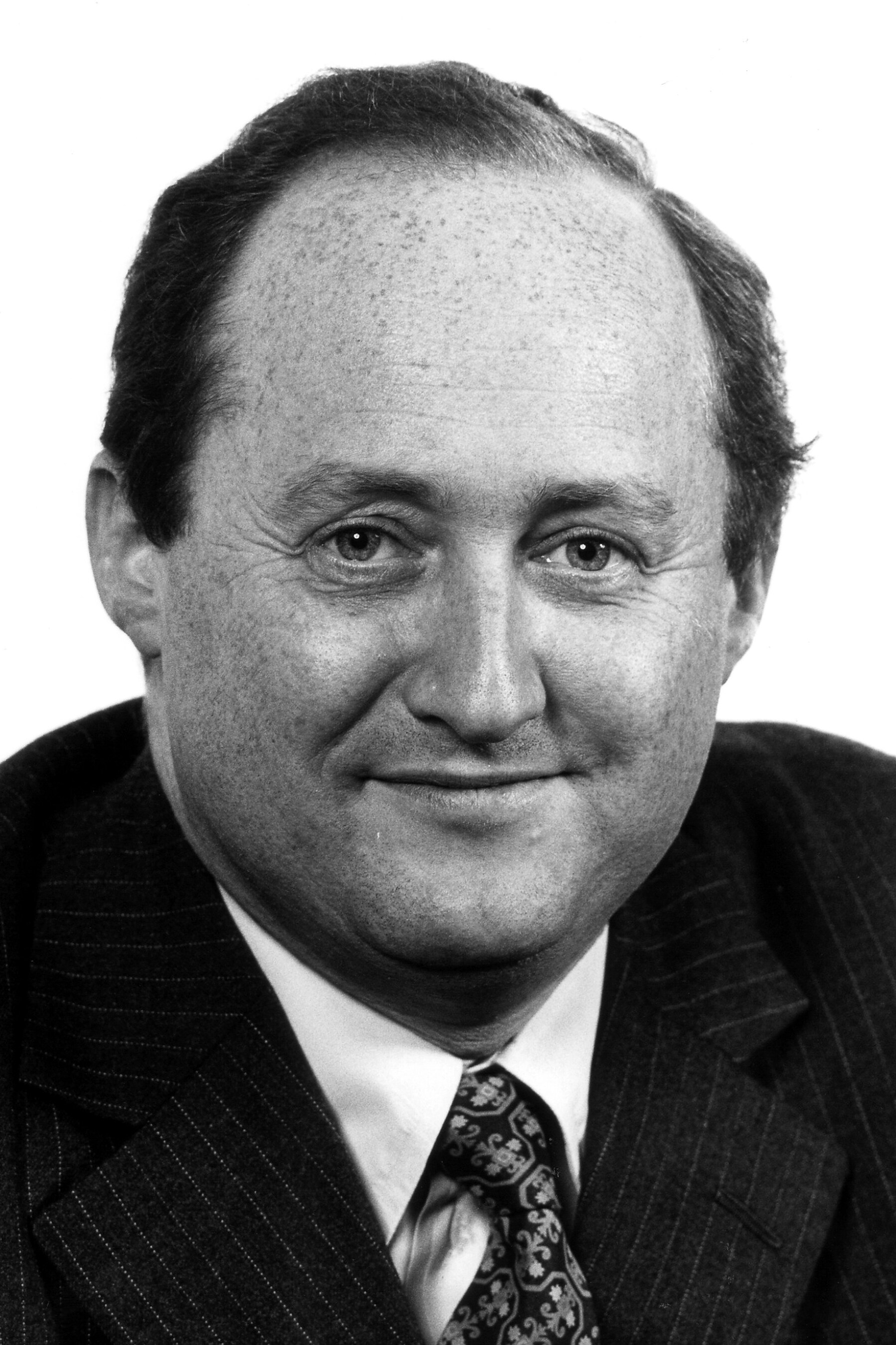
Tugendhat in 1980

Tugendhat was educated at King's College School, Cambridge, and Ampleforth College, before going up to Gonville and Caius College, Cambridge. After university, he took up a career in journalism, becoming a features editor and leader writer for the Financial Times from 1960 to 1970. In 1970 he was elected as a Conservative Member of Parliament (MP) for the Cities of London and Westminster, remaining in the House of Commons until 1977, when he resigned after being appointed a Member of the European Commission. He was first appointed to the EC by a Labour Government over the head of the nominee of the Conservative leader Margaret Thatcher, but four years later, as Prime Minister, Thatcher reappointed him, and he served as Vice-President of the European Commission from 1981 until 1985.

On 3 December 1980, when leaving his home in Brussels, two bullets were fired at Tugendhat from a car, narrowly missing him; he recalled the attack "closer than I would have liked". The Provisional IRA claimed responsibility for the assassination attempt.

Following his role at the European Commission, Tugendhat was Chairman of the Royal Institute for International Affairs (Chatham House) from 1986 to 1995, and of the Civil Aviation Authority from 1986 to 1991, when he was succeeded by Sir Christopher Chataway. In 1993 he was created a Life Peer on the nomination of Prime Minister John Major.

Lord Tugendhat later went on to become the Chairman of Abbey National, Blue Circle Industries, the European Advisory Board of Lehman Brothers, and the Imperial College Healthcare NHS Trust. He also served as a director of Rio Tinto and Eurotunnel, among other companies.

== Other work ==
Tugendhat is a member of the Official Monetary and Financial Institutions Forum (OMFIF) advisory board, an independent financial think tank which serves as a neutral, non-lobbying platform for exchanges among official institutions and private sector counter-parties worldwide.

== Personal life ==
He married Julia Lissant Dobson; they have two sons, James (born 1971) and Angus (born 1974).

His younger brother, Sir Michael Tugendhat, was a Judge of the High Court of England and Wales, and his nephew Thomas Tugendhat has served as the Conservative MP for Tonbridge and Malling, then Tonbridge, since May 2015.

== Honours ==
Knighted in the 1990 Birthday Honours, he was elevated on 15 October 1993 to the peerage for life as Baron Tugendhat, of Widdington in the County of Essex.

In 1998 he became the Chancellor of the University of Bath, standing down in 2013 to be succeeded by Prince Edward, Duke of Edinburgh. In 1998 Lord Tugendhat was awarded the honorary degree of Doctor of Laws by the University of Bath, becoming Chairman of Imperial College Healthcare NHS Trust, the UK's first academic health science centre, from 2007 until December 2011.

Coat of arms of Christopher Tugendhat, Baron Tugendhat

Crest
A cock reguardant Azure beaked and legged Argent combed and wattled Gules in the beak a chain of twelve benzene rings conjoined Or.
Escutcheon
Per bend sinister indented acute of six points downwards the chief bendy en pointe Azure and Gules thre base bendy en pointe Sable and Or the whole parted and separated Argent.
Supporters
On either side a bear statant erect reguardant Sable murally crowned Or.

== See also ==
- House of Lords
- Tugendhat family

== Publications ==
- Oil: The Biggest Business (1968) London. Eyre and Spottiswoode
- Multinationals (1971) London. Eyre and Spottiswoode
- Making Sense of Europe (1986) London. Viking
- Options for British Foreign Policy in the 1990s (Chatham House Papers) by Christopher Tugendhat and William Wallace (Nov 1988)
- Roy Jenkins, a Retrospective (2004); contributor, wrote Chapter 12.
- A History of Britain through Books 1900-1964 (2019) London. Whitefox
- The Worm in the Apple (2022) London. Haus Publishing.

Parliament of the United Kingdom
Preceded by John Smith	Member of Parliament for Cities of London and Westminster; 1970 – Feb 1974	Constituency abolished
New constituency	Member of Parliament for City of London and Westminster South; Feb 1974 – 1977	Succeeded by Peter Brooke
Political offices
Preceded by Wilhelm Haferkamp	European Commissioner for Budget & Financial Control and Financial Institutions; 1977–1985	Succeeded by Henning Christophersen
Preceded by François-Xavier Ortoli	Vice-President of the European Commission; 1981–1985	Succeeded by Frans Andriessen
Academic offices
Preceded by Sir Denys Henderson	Chancellor of the University of Bath; 1998–2013	Succeeded by The Duke of Edinburgh
Orders of precedence in the United Kingdom
Preceded by The Lord Dixon-Smith	Gentlemen; Baron Tugendhat	Followed by The Lord Nickson
