= Tugendhat =

The Tugendhat family was a family of Czech-Jewish textile and oil industrialists. World War II scattered them through Europe and America, and descendants have become influential politicians and academics.

== Family name ==
- Christopher Tugendhat, Baron Tugendhat (born 1937), a British Conservative politician, businessman, son of Máire Tugendhat
- Daniela Hammer-Tugendhat (1946-2025), Venezuelan born, Swiss-Austrian art historian
- Ernst Tugendhat (1930–2023), Czech-German philosopher
- Máire Tugendhat (1910–1994), née Máire Littledale, British painter and engraver
- Michael Tugendhat (born 1944), judge of the High Court of England and Wales, son of Máire Tugendhat
- Ricardo López Tugendhat (born 1977), Ecuadorian sport shooter
- Tom Tugendhat (born 1973), British Conservative politician, son of Michael Tugendhat

== See also ==
- Villa Tugendhat, house in Brno, Czech Republic, designed by Ludwig Mies van der Rohe
- Tugendhat chair, a chair designed by Mies for the Villa Tugendhat
- 8343 Tugendhat, a main-belt asteroid discovered on 1986 by A. Mrkos
