= Marie Tugendhat =

Marie Tugendhat may refer to one of several people:

- Máire Tugendhat (1910–1994) née Máire Littledale, a British painter and engraver
- Daniela Hammer-Tugendhat (1946–2025) née Marie-Daniela Tugendhat, an Austrian art historian
