= Manifold Trust =

The Manifold Trust was created by Sir John Smith in 1962 to generate funds for conservation in the UK, particularly of buildings, and to support other culturally important activities, including churches, arts, education, and the environment.

The trust buys long leases shortly before they expire, when their value is relatively low, and benefits from the rents paid by the tenant in the meantime. This strategy has created, in Smith's words, a "cataract of gold". The trust give small grants, usually from £500 to £5,000, to registered charities. It is based at Shottesbrooke House, Smith's country house, near Maidenhead.

The trust works closely with the Landmark Trust which was also founded Sir John and Lady Smith in 1965.

In 2020, the trust awarded £464,166 to eight recipients; the bulk of awards went to Eton College to be used for bursaries.
