= John Smith (Conservative politician) =

British banker, Conservative Member of Parliament, and Lord Lieutenant of Berkshire

Sir John Smith CH CBE

Member of Parliament for Cities of London and Westminster
- In office 4 November 1965 – 29 May 1970
- Preceding: Sir Harry Hylton-Foster
- Succeeded by: Christopher Tugendhat

Lord Lieutenant of Berkshire
- In office 1975–1978

Personal details
- Born: John Linsday Eric Smith; 3 April 1923 London, England
- Died: 28 February 2007 (aged 83) Windsor, England
- Party: Conservative
- Spouse: Christian Carnegy (m. 1952)
- Children: 5
- Education: Eton College
- Alma mater: New College, Oxford
- Occupation: Banker, politician

Sir John Lindsay Eric Smith CH CBE (3 April 1923 – 28 February 2007) was a British banker, Conservative Member of Parliament, and Lord Lieutenant of Berkshire. He was involved with many architectural, industrial and maritime conservation charities. He founded the Landmark Trust in 1965.

== Early and private life ==
Smith was born in London, the son of Captain Evan Cadogan Eric Smith MC of Ashfold in Sussex and his wife, Beatrice Helen (née Williams). He was a scion of the Smith family: a family of bankers who founded the bank Smiths of Nottingham in the 1650s. The bank merged with the National Provincial Bank after the First World War and his father became its chairman. His mother was the daughter of Albert Williams and granddaughter of Sir George Williams, founder of the YMCA, and a great-granddaughter of Thomas Cook. His elder sister, Fortune, married Hugh FitzRoy, Earl of Euston (later 11th Duke of Grafton) in 1946; she was a Lady of the Bedchamber to Queen Elizabeth II from 1953 to 1966, and was the Mistress of the Robes from 1967 until her death on 3 December 2021.

Smith was educated at Eton College, where he was Captain of the Oppidans and won the Rosebery Prize for History. He joined the Fleet Air Arm in 1942 and trained as an observer at HMS Daedalus. He served in the Second World War in a Fairey Swordfish squadron in the Mediterranean and the Atlantic, then as a liaison officer to the US Ninth Air Force, and then with a squadron of Fairey Barracuda in the North Atlantic. He flew as a navigator in an operation to dive-bomb the German battleship Tirpitz in the Kvænangen fjord in July 1944. He joined the aircraft carrier HMS Indomitable, and served in the Far East with 845 Naval Air Squadron, flying Grumman Avengers. He was in Ceylon at the end of the War.

After the War, he read history at New College, Oxford, where he later became an honorary fellow in 1979. He met his future wife, Christian Carnegy, in Oxford, where she was reading English. They married in 1952.

The couple had two sons and three daughters:

- Serena Mary Smith (married The Rt. Hon Nicholas Soames, Baron Soames of Fletching, son of Christopher Soames, Baron Soames)
- Bartholomew Evan Eric Smith (born 1 February 1955; founder of the Amber Foundation and West London Aero Club, who in 1977 killed four people (including former footballer Peter Houseman while drink driving, escaping jail for reasons almost certainly completely unrelated to his family's wealth and status).The court record was sealed for ninety nine years.
- Adam Carnegy Eric Smith (born 1953)
- Dido Smith
- Emma Smith, who pre-deceased him

Smith owned a property at No. 1, Smith Square, in his former constituency. However, he resided at Shottesbrooke Park, near Maidenhead in Berkshire, the ancient home of the Vansittart family which he inherited from his father's second cousin in 1962.

He died in Windsor. He was survived by his wife, their two sons, and two of their three daughters.

== Financial and political career ==
He followed the family tradition of being a director of Coutts and Co, the private bank and a subsidiary of National Provincial, in 1950. He was the ninth generation of Smiths to work in the bank. He remained a director for 43 years, until 1993.

He also joined the boards of many other companies, including Rolls-Royce Limited, the Ottoman Bank and the Financial Times. He was also a deputy-governor of Royal Exchange Assurance. He was awarded the OBE in 1964.

He was a Conservative politician. After the death of the Speaker of the House of Commons, Sir Harry Hylton Foster in 1965, Smith was elected to succeed him in the subsequent by-election as Member of Parliament for the Cities of London and Westminster. Smith served until he stood down in 1970. He was appointed a CBE in 1975.

He served as High Steward of Maidenhead, and as Lord-Lieutenant of Berkshire from 1975 to 1978. He was knighted in 1988 and became a Member of the Order of the Companions of Honour in 1994.

He greatly enjoyed travelling, and claimed to be the first man to visit all of the explorers' huts in Antarctica.

== Conservation ==
Smith served on committees of the National Trust from 1952 to 1995, and was deputy chairman from 1980 to 1995. He assisted financially with repairs to Barlaston Hall, damaged by subsidence due to coal mining. He also served on the Standing Committee for Museums and Galleries from 1958 to 1966, the Historic Buildings Council from 1971 to 1978, the Redundant Churches Fund from 1972 to 1974, and the National Heritage Memorial Fund from 1980 to 1982.

He founded the Manifold Trust in 1962, to raise money for charity by buying long leases close to the date of their expiry. The rather speculative venture was very successful, producing a "cataract of gold" which funded many of his charitable interests, including the Landmark Trust, which he and Lady Smith founded three years later, and which still operates from their estate at Shottesbrooke. Sir John identified and acquired properties for restoration, while Lady Smith supervised their fitting out, commissioning soft furnishings for each inspired by objects or design features associated with the buildings.

He was involved in canal restoration through his friendship with L. T. C. Rolt, and was a driving force behind the preservation of HMS Belfast, HMS Warrior and SS Great Britain.

Parliament of the United Kingdom
Preceded by Sir Harry Hylton-Foster	Member of Parliament for the Cities of London and Westminster; 1965–1970	Succeeded by Christopher Tugendhat
Honorary titles
Preceded by Hon. David Smith	Lord Lieutenant of Berkshire; 1975–1978	Succeeded by Hon. Gordon Palmer
