= Harry Hylton-Foster =

British politician (1905–1965)

The Right Honourable Sir Harry Hylton-Foster
- 1960 portrait of Hylton-Foster dressed in the Speaker′s robes.

Speaker of the House of Commons of the United Kingdom
- In office 20 October 1959 – 2 September 1965
- Monarch: Elizabeth II
- Prime Minister: Harold Macmillan; Alec Douglas-Home; Harold Wilson
- Preceded by: William Morrison
- Succeeded by: Horace King

Solicitor General for England and Wales
- In office 18 October 1954 – 22 October 1959
- Prime Minister: Winston Churchill; Anthony Eden; Harold Macmillan
- Preceded by: Sir Reginald Manningham-Buller
- Succeeded by: Sir Jocelyn Simon

Member of Parliament for Cities of London and Westminster
- In office 8 October 1959 – 2 September 1965
- Preceded by: Sir Harold Webbe
- Succeeded by: John Smith

Member of Parliament for York
- In office 23 February 1950 – 18 September 1959
- Preceded by: John Corlett
- Succeeded by: Charles Longbottom

Personal details
- Born: 10 April 1905 Surrey, England
- Died: 2 September 1965 (aged 60) London, England
- Party: Conservative
- Spouse: Audrey Brown
- Education: Magdalen College, Oxford

Sir Harry Braustyn Hylton Hylton-Foster (10 April 1905 – 2 September 1965), was a British Conservative Party politician who served as a Member of Parliament (MP) from 1950 until his death in 1965. He was also the Speaker of the House of Commons for the final six years of his life.

== Early life ==
Hylton-Foster was born in Surrey, his father was a barrister, and he was educated at Eton College before reading jurisprudence at Magdalen College, Oxford, in which he graduated with a first-class degree. He was called to the bar by the Inner Temple in 1928, at which time he was also working as a legal secretary for Robert Finlay, 1st Viscount Finlay.

== Military service ==
During the Second World War, Hylton-Foster served in the Royal Air Force volunteer reserve. He also served as a deputy judge advocate, a military judge, in North Africa.

== Political career ==
After the end of the war, he stood as the Conservative candidate for the Shipley seat in the 1945 general election, but was unsuccessful. However, in the 1950 election he succeeded in taking the York seat, a seat he held for the next two elections before standing for the safer seat for the Cities of London and Westminster in the 1959 election. He was made King's Counsel in 1947.

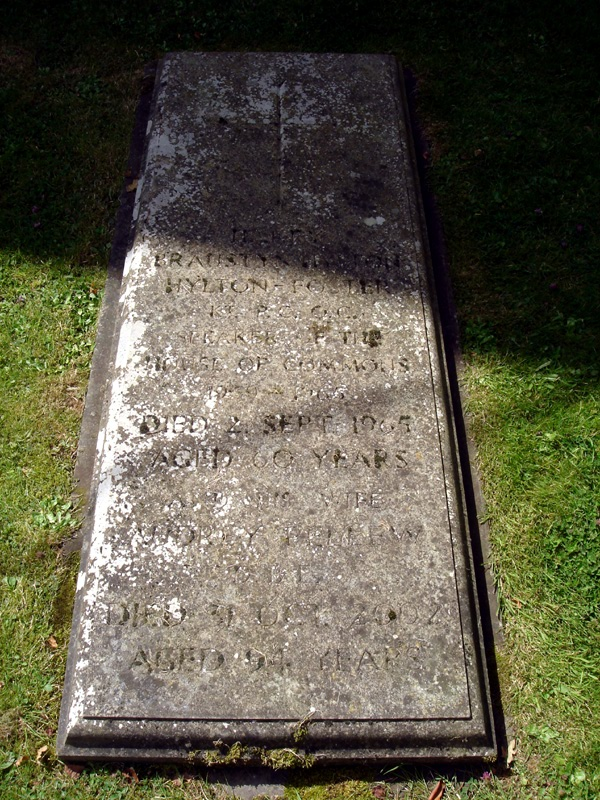
Harry Hylton-Foster funerary monument, St Barnabas Church, Ranmore Common, Surrey

In 1954, Hylton-Foster was named the Solicitor General for England and Wales, receiving the customary knighthood. The fact that he was serving as solicitor general when he was named speaker of the House of Commons in 1959 was a source of some controversy, which was compounded by the fact that the opposition Labour Party felt they had been insufficiently consulted about the nomination. However, once the controversy died down, Hylton-Foster proved to be a popular and respected speaker.

== Personal life, death and aftermath ==
Hylton-Foster was married to the former Audrey Brown.

On 2 September 1965, Hylton-Foster collapsed while walking along Duke Street, St James's. Attempts to resuscitate him were unsuccessful, and he was pronounced dead, aged 60, upon arrival at nearby St George's Hospital. Audrey Hylton-Foster was given a life peerage as Baroness Hylton-Foster in his honour the same year, and was granted a life annuity by the Honourable Lady Hylton-Foster's Annuity Act 1965.

Hylton-Foster and his wife are buried together in the churchyard of St Barnabas Church, Ranmore Common, Surrey.

== Arms ==
Coat of arms of Harry Hylton-Foster
Crest In front of a bugle-horn as in the arms a greyhound courant Argent. Escutcheon Argent on a fess Vert between three bugle-horns Sable stringed Or a representation of the Speaker’s Mace in fess head to the dexter Or a bordure Vert.

Parliament of the United Kingdom
Preceded by John Corlett	Member of Parliament for the City of York; 1950–1959	Succeeded by Charles Longbottom
Preceded by Sir Harold Webbe	Member of Parliament for the Cities of London and Westminster; 1959–1965	Succeeded by John Smith
Preceded by William Morrison	Speaker of the House of Commons of the United Kingdom; 1959–1965	Succeeded by Dr. Horace King
Legal offices
Preceded by Sir Reginald Manningham-Buller	Solicitor General for England and Wales; 1954–1959	Succeeded by Sir Jocelyn Simon
