= Michael Tugendhat =

English judge (born 1944)

Sir Michael Tugendhat
- Born: Michael George Tugendhat; 21 October 1944 (age 81); Bishop's Stortford, Hertfordshire, England
- Other name: The Hon. Mr Justice Tugendhat
- Education: Gonville and Caius College, Cambridge
- Occupation: High Court judge
- Known for: Media law cases
- Spouse: Blandine de Loisne (m. 1970)
- Children: 3, including Tom

Sir Michael George Tugendhat (born 21 October 1944) is a retired High Court judge in England and Wales. He was the High Court's senior media judge, taking over that role from Mr Justice Eady on 1 October 2010.

== Early life ==
Michael Tugendhat is the son of Georg Tugendhat, an immigrant from Vienna, Austria, who founded a petrochemical refinery in Manchester, and his British wife Marie Littledale. His elder brother is Lord Tugendhat, a Conservative politician, businessman, and author, while one of his sons is Tom Tugendhat, a Conservative MP. Sir Michael is married and has four sons. His father was from a Jewish family, and converted to Catholicism.

=== Education ===
Tugendhat attended Ampleforth College and Gonville and Caius College, Cambridge, where he studied philosophy and classics. He won the Henry Fellowship to attend Yale Law School and studied at the Hague Academy of International Law before being called to the bar by the Inner Temple in 1969. He then joined Five Raymond Buildings, a set of barristers' chambers specialising in media and entertainment law.

== Legal career ==
Tugendhat was appointed Queen's Counsel in 1986. He became a recorder of the Crown Court in 1994 and a deputy judge sitting in the High Court of Justice in 1995. In 2000, he became a judge sitting in the appeal courts of Jersey and Guernsey. He was appointed a High Court Judge, Queen's Bench division, in April 2003. In 2010 he was appointed to be the Judge in Charge of the Queen's Bench jury lists. He is a fellow of the Institute of Advanced Legal Studies. He was formerly on the management committee of the Advice on Individual Rights in Europe Centre.

Described by The Guardian as "Britain's leading expert on privacy law", Tugendhat told the Commons' select committee on Culture, Media and Sport:

We must never underestimate the asset we have in the free press and I am afraid a free press is bound to be one that occasionally gets it wrong either by malice or mistake.

== Notable cases ==
=== Barrister ===
In 2000 Tugendhat acted for David and Victoria Beckham, who were petitioning the High Court to prevent the publication of a biography of them by Andrew Morton. The Beckhams claimed a portion of the book was derived from confidential information passed on by their former bodyguard, who was already enjoined from making public disclosures about the couple. Tugendhat called the bodyguard's conduct "a very bad case of disloyalty and breach of confidentiality" but opposing counsel, Geoffrey Robertson QC, argued that Morton and his publisher enjoyed protection of their free speech in this regard. The parties reached an out of court settlement and the book was published.

In 2001 he represented The Sunday Times in its efforts to publish extracts from a book by former MI6 officer Richard Tomlinson. The Attorney General sought to compel newspapers to gain the approval of the Government before publishing such sensitive information. The court (Lord Phillips, Lord Justice Tuckey, and Lord Justice Longmore) ruled that, as the information had already been published in Russian newspaper Komsomolskaya Pravda, it was already in the public domain and so restraint on publication in the UK could not be justified.

Later in 2001 he acted for a number of newspapers including The Times, the Daily Mirror and the Daily Mail, which sought to overturn a blanket ban on publishing unauthorised disclosures by former MI5 agents, including those of David Shayler. The House of Lords ruled that the statutory prohibition on agents revealing secret information was proportionate and did not contravene Article 10 of the European Convention on Human Rights.

Also in 2001 Tugendhat represented internet service provider Demon Internet, which sought to amend a ruling which would hold it responsible if any of its customers used the Demon service to identify the new identities of the killers of James Bulger. The court amended the order to indemnify Demon and other ISPs providing they took "all reasonable steps" to remove the infringing material. The order remained more onerous than Demon had wished – Tugendhat said of it "Happy would not be the word, but we have all signed it."

In 2002, in the case Theakston v Mirror Group Newspapers Ltd, he represented TV presenter Jamie Theakston, who sought to enjoin newspapers from publishing a story about Theakston visiting a London brothel, arguing that, as the alleged visit took place in private, The Sunday People's publication of details infringed his right to privacy under Article 8 of the European Convention on Human Rights. Refusing the application for the injunction, Mr Justice Ouseley said "It is not inherent in the nature of a brothel that all or anything that transpires within is confidential."

In 2003 Tugendhat appeared for actors Michael Douglas and Catherine Zeta-Jones in Douglas v Hello! Ltd before the High Court. Douglas and Jones had sold rights to publish photographs of their 2000 wedding to celebrity news magazine OK!, but a paparazzo surreptitiously photographed the proceedings and sold his photographs to OK!'s competitor Hello. Douglas, Jones, and OK! sued Hello's publisher, alleging their privacy had been invaded and claiming £1.75 million in damages. Rejecting the claim that the couple's selling photos of their wedding rendered the event "not genuinely private", Tugendhat argued "If Michael Douglas and Catherine Zeta-Jones could not offer a slice without offering the whole cake, then their own freedom of expression is diminished." The Douglases were successful in their claim; Hello successfully appealed to the Court of Appeal. The Douglases then appealed to the House of Lords which (in a combined ruling with OBG Ltd v Allan), denied the appeal.

=== Judge ===
In January 2010, Tugendhat overturned a superinjunction imposed on the application of the footballer John Terry which prevented the media from revealing details of his affair with team-mate Wayne Bridge's former girlfriend, Vanessa Perroncel, saying he did not feel the order was "necessary or proportionate". He also criticised Terry's lawyers for not notifying newspapers of the action they were taking.

In June 2010, at an interim hearing in the case of Thornton v Telegraph Media Group, his ruling in favour of the Telegraph Media Group over Lynn Barber's review of Sarah Thornton's book, Seven Days in the Art World, was said to "raise the bar for libel claimants." Amongst the allegations made in Barber's review that was the subject of the case, Barber had written that Thornton had given her interviewees copy approval, a practice of which journalists would "disapprove." Thornton considered this to be defamatory. Tugendhat accepted the argument of the Telegraph Media Group that there should be a "threshold of seriousness" for libel claims to prevent trivial claims and that a claimant should be able to demonstrate a "substantial effect" on their reputation to prove defamation. However, the case went to trial in 2011, at which point Tugendhat ruled in favour of Thornton. During trial it was established that Barber had lied in her evidence to the court about the extent of her knowledge of the accusations published in her book review. It emerged that Barber was fully aware that some of the accusations in her review were completely false, a fact which resulted in Tugendhat awarding Thornton £15,000 in malicious falsehood damages. This was a notable award as it appears to have been the first award of general damages for malicious falsehood. In the same judgment, Tugendhat went on to rule that other accusations in Barber's review were defamatory of Thornton, and awarded the latter a further £50,000 in damages. By doing so, the judge overturned the Telegraph Media Group's "offer of amends" defence, a first in English legal history.

In May 2011 Tugendhat partially lifted a gagging order brought by Sir Fred Goodwin, the former chief executive of the Royal Bank of Scotland, just hours after details of his alleged extra-marital affair were made public in the House of Lords. Tugendhat varied the injunction to allow publication of Goodwin's name, but not details of the alleged relationship and the name of the woman said to be involved.

In November 2012, Tugendhat presided over an attempt by the Metropolitan Police to force claims against them relating to relationships between undercover police officers and unsuspecting women to be held in secret. (See National Public Order Intelligence Unit, Mark Kennedy (police officer), Bob Lambert.) He ruled in January 2013 that parts of these contentious cases (relating to the Human Rights Act) should be heard in a secret Investigatory Powers Tribunal, from which claimants are themselves excluded, and which to which there is no power of appeal. However, he ruled against the Metropolitan Police in relation to parts of the cases brought under common law, which will be held in the High Court rather than in secret.

In May 2013, Tugendhat passed judgement in the landmark libel case McAlpine v Bercow, in which a one-line tweet by Sally Bercow was judged defamatory and led to an out-of-court settlement.

== Honours ==
Tugendhat was appointed Knight Bachelor on 20 May 2003 upon his appointment to the High Court. His investiture ceremony took place at Buckingham Palace on 25 June 2003 where he was knighted by Queen Elizabeth II.

== See also ==
- Tugendhat family

== Bibliography ==
- The Law of Privacy and the Media (joint editor w/Iain Christie, 2002) ISBN 978-0-19-925430-9, Oxford University Press
- Commercial Fraud: Civil Liability, Human Rights, and Money Laundering (with Janet Ulph and James Glister) ISBN 978-0-19-826867-3, Oxford University Press
- Les droits du genre humain : la liberté en France et en Angleterre (1159-1793), [The rights of mankind : liberty in France and England (1159-1793)] (with Elizabeth de Montlaur Martin, 2021), ISBN 978-2-36517-110-6, Société de Législation comparée, Paris (awarded by the French Académie des sciences morales et politiques the Prix Édouard Bonnefous 2022)
- Liberty Intact: Human Rights in English Law (2016) ISBN 978-0198790990, Oxford University Press
- Fighting for Freedom? (2017), ISBN 978-1-911128-49-6, Bright_Blue_(organisation)
- Liberty in France and Britain, 1159–1789: Restoring Human Rights, (2026)(with Elizabeth de Montlaur Martin) ISBN 978-1-837653-81-2, Boydell Press
