= Audrey Hylton-Foster, Baroness Hylton-Foster =

British life peeress (1908–2002)

The Right Honourable The Baroness Hylton-Foster DBE

Convenor of the Crossbench Peers
- In office 1974–1995
- Preceded by: The Lord Strang
- Succeeded by: The Lord Weatherill

Member of the House of Lords
- Lord Temporal
- Life peerage 7 December 1965 – 31 October 2002

Personal details
- Born: Audrey Pellew Clifton Brown; 19 May 1908
- Died: 31 October 2002 (aged 94)
- Party: Crossbench
- Spouse: Sir Harry Braustyn Hylton-Foster (m. 1931)
- Parents: Douglas Clifton Brown (father); Violet Cicely Kathleen Wollaston (mother)

Audrey Pellew Hylton-Foster, Baroness Hylton-Foster DBE (née Brown; 19 May 1908 – 31 October 2002), was the daughter of Douglas Clifton Brown, 1st Viscount Ruffside, and Violet Cicely Kathleen Wollaston. She married Sir Harry Braustyn Hylton-Foster, who had started a distinguished career at the Bar in 1931; they had no children.

Her great-grandparents were Charles Rowe, who was mixed race, due to being of African descent, and his Lima-born wife Sarah. Born in Simla, India, she was educated at St George's, Ascot, and Ivy House, Wimbledon. Both her father and husband served as Speaker of the House of Commons.

== Red Cross work ==
Audrey Hylton-Foster first lived at Speaker's House during her father's time there, when she went to recover from measles. While she was convalescing she started working for the British Red Cross, and this, apart from politics, became her life's work. During World War II she was a nurse at St Luke's Hospital, Chelsea. She cycled thousands of miles around London on her Red Cross duties. In 1950 she became director of the Chelsea division of the British Red Cross. She was at various times president, chairman and patron of the London branch. In late 1980 she was acting as consultant at the national headquarters.

== Politics ==
Her husband began his political career after World War II. He lost his first attempt to gain a seat in the House of Commons, for the Shipley constituency, in 1945. By 1950 he was Member of Parliament (MP) for York. In 1951 and 1955 his majorities were slim; however, in 1959, after changing constituencies, his majority was a very healthy 17,000.

After her husband's death in office in 1965, she was created a life peer as Baroness Hylton-Foster, of the City of Westminster on 7 December 1965. Despite her prior objections to women politicians, she became an active member of the House of Lords, and for many years served as Convenor of the Crossbench peers. She was appointed a Dame Commander of the Order of the British Empire (DBE) in the 1990 Birthday Honours.

== Honourable Lady Hylton-Foster's Annuity Act 1965 ==
Honourable Lady Hylton-Foster's Annuity Act 1965 (Note: Section 2.)
- Act of Parliament
- Parliament of the United Kingdom
- Long title: An Act to settle and secure an annuity upon Audrey Pellew Hylton-Foster, commonly known as the Honourable Lady Hylton-Foster, in consideration of the eminent services of her late husband, the Right Honourable Sir Harry Braustyn Hylton Hylton-Foster.
- Citation: 1965 c. 70
- Territorial extent: United Kingdom

Dates
- Royal assent: 8 November 1965
- Commencement: 8 November 1965 (Note: The Acts of Parliament (Commencement) Act 1793.)
- Repealed: 22 July 2004
Other legislation
Repealed by	Statute Law (Repeals) Act 2004

Status: Repealed

Text of statute as originally enacted

The Honourable Lady Hylton-Foster's Annuity Act 1965 (c. 70) provided an annuity (essentially, a pension) of £1,667 a year to Audrey Hylton-Foster for the rest of her life.

It was granted in consideration of the service provided by her husband, Sir Harry Hylton-Foster, as Speaker of the House of Commons between October 1959 and September 1965, when he died in office.

Baroness Hylton-Foster herself died on 31 October 2002, and consequently the act was repealed in 2004.

== Death ==
She died on 31 October 2002, at her home, aged 94.

== Arms ==
Coat of arms of Audrey Hylton-Foster, Baroness Hylton-Foster
Escutcheon The arms of her husband Sir Harry (Argent on a fess Vert between three bugle-horns Sable stringed Or a representation of the Speaker’s Mace in fess head to the dexter Or a bordure Vert) surmounted by the arms of her father Lord Ruffside (Gules a Chevron Or between two Bear's Paws erased in chief and four hands conjoined in saltire of the second in base on a Chief engrailed Or an Eagle displayed Sable).

== Notes ==
Parliament of the United Kingdom
Preceded by The Lord Strang	Convenor of the Crossbench Peers; 1974–1995	Succeeded by The Lord Weatherill
