= Máire Tugendhat =

British artist (1910–1994)

Máire Tugendhat (19 April 1910 – 8 August 1994; née Máire Littledale, also known as Marie Littledale and Marie Tugendhat) was a British painter, engraver, printmaker and illustrator.

== Life ==
Tugendhat was born in Swansea, Glamorganshire, on 19 April 1910 to Arthur Charles Littledale and Mary Josephine née Harris.

She trained at the Slade School of Fine Art in London between 1933 and 1935. She was noted for her wood engravings, winning the 1934 wood engraving prize at the Slade.

== Works ==
In 1934–5, under her maiden name of Máire Littledale, Tugendhat created a wood engraving collection, "Alphabet of British Birds", a set of which was presented to the British Museum by the Contemporary Arts Society in 1936. It is recorded that these wood engravings were designed for a "Child's Book of British Birds (generic title)", but whether they were published as such is unclear.

Tugendhat exhibited at the Royal Academy Summer Exhibition in London in 1959. She exhibited in the "Small is Beautiful" exhibition at the Chichester House Gallery, Ditchling, from 25 July – 12 August 1978.

Tugendhat's works are held in the British Museum and the Victoria and Albert Museum.

== Personal life ==
In September 1934, Tugendhat married Georg Tugendhat, an Austrian-born economist and industrialist who had immigrated from Vienna to England in 1921. The couple had four children: British Conservative Party politician Christopher Tugendhat, Baron Tugendhat (born 1937), art dealer in Zurich Maria Christina Feilchenfeldt, née Tugendhat (1940–2009), solicitor Veronica Mary Pettifer, née Tugendhat, and retired High Court judge Sir Michael Tugendhat (born 1944).

During the third quarter of the 20th century the Tugendhat family lived at Greensted Hall, Greensted, near Chipping Ongar, Essex. Georg Tugendhat died in 1973. In her later years Máire lived in Barton-upon-Humber in Lincolnshire. Tugendhat died of a stroke on 8 August 1994 in Hull, Yorkshire. She was cremated. She shares a headstone with her husband in the graveyard at St Mary the Virgin church at Widdington in Essex.

In c. 1972 Tugendhat typed out her grandmother Julia Cecilia Harris's memoirs of life in Ireland in the second half of the nineteenth century. These are now in the collection of the University of Limerick.

One of Tugendhat's grandsons is the Conservative MP Tom Tugendhat.
