= Cities of London and Westminster (UK Parliament constituency) =

Parliamentary constituency in the United Kingdom, 1950 onwards

Coordinates: 51.51°N 0.13°W

- Borough constituency for the House of Commons
- Interactive map of boundaries from 2024
- Boundary within Greater London
- County: Greater London
- Population: 127,800 (2022)
- Electorate: 73,140 (March 2020)
- Borough: City of London and City of Westminster
- Major settlements: City of London, City of Westminster

Current constituency
- Created: 1950
- Member of Parliament: Rachel Blake (Labour Co-op)
- Seats: One
- Created from: City of London (1298–1950), Westminster Abbey, Westminster St George's

Cities of London and Westminster (known as City of London and Westminster South from 1974 to 1997) is a constituency (Note: A borough constituency (for the purposes of election expenses and type of returning officer)) in Greater London returning a single Member of Parliament (MP) to the House of Commons of the UK Parliament. It was established in 1950 in central London. As with all constituencies, the election is decided using the first-past-the-post system of election. Until the 2024 general election, when the constituency elected Rachel Blake, a Labour Co-op MP, the constituency had always elected the candidate nominated by the Conservative Party.

== History ==
Before 1950 the City of London formed a two-member constituency on its own. The Boundary Commission for England began reviewing constituencies in January 1946 using rules defined under the Representation of the People Act 1944, which excluded the City of London from the redistribution procedure; (Note: Whether the City of London returned one or two members was left for the decision of Parliament.) the Commission recommended that the borough of Chelsea and the City of Westminster form a single Parliamentary Borough of Chelsea and Westminster with two divisions.

In February 1948 the Government brought forward a new Representation of the People Bill which removed the right of owners of business premises to a second vote; this would have had the effect of reducing the electorate of the City of London from 12,500 to 4,600. The Bill proposed also to end the City of London as a separate constituency and to merge it with the adjacent boroughs of Finsbury and Shoreditch. During debates on the Bill, the Government amended it to substitute a link between the City of London and the City of Westminster. In introducing the amendment the Home Secretary James Chuter Ede noted that the alterations to the constituencies in Westminster, Chelsea and Kensington had been agreed unanimously at a conference between the Members of Parliament and representatives of the boroughs affected.

These changes came into force from the 1950 election.

=== Boundary changes ===
No alteration was made by the First Periodical Report on constituency boundaries in 1954. In the Second Periodical Report in 1969, the Boundary Commission wrote that their initial feelings were that "except for a minor alteration to follow a new ward boundary" they felt that there was "no reason to disturb" the constituency, and they received no objections to this proposal. Westminster City Council later suggested that the constituency could be more accurately named as 'The City of London and Westminster South'; the Boundary Commission found opinion divided and left the name unchanged when it published revised proposals for two other constituencies within the city. Subsequent representations on the name were received and the Commission decided that, although justified on historical grounds, the name was "not now entirely accurate" and so proposed the renaming as suggested by the City Council.

In initial proposals during the Third Periodical Review (1983), the Boundary Commission proposed to abolish the St Marylebone constituency and add four wards from it (Cavendish, Baker Street, Bryanston and Regents Park) to the previous City of London and Westminster South constituency; they provisionally named the result 'The City of London and Westminster'. After a local inquiry, the Regents Park ward was removed, and Hyde Park ward (from the Paddington constituency) was added; unanimous opinion at the inquiry favoured naming the result 'The City of London and Westminster South'.

For the Fourth Periodical Review (1995), the Boundary Commission paired the City of Westminster with the Royal Borough of Kensington and Chelsea for consideration. The commission's initial proposals, to expand the constituency by two wards (Bayswater and Lancaster Gate) formerly in Westminster North and to return to the name 'Cities of London and Westminster', were upheld after a local inquiry, despite multiple counter-proposals.

At the Fifth Periodical Review (in 2007), the initial proposals of the Boundary Commission paired the City of Westminster with the London Borough of Brent although they involved only minor changes to the Cities of London and Westminster constituency to take account of new ward boundaries. Widespread objections ("almost universal hostility") to the pairing led to a local inquiry, which decided that Westminster and the City of London should be reviewed separately and not paired with any other borough. The Commission proposed a new Cities of London and Westminster constituency in which the revised Bayswater and Lancaster Gate wards were removed.

Early proposals made during the initial stages of the postponed Sixth Periodic Review of Westminster constituencies proposed linking the City of London to the southern wards of Islington in a constituency to be known as "The City of London and Islington South". Most of the Westminster wards were proposed to form part of a Westminster and Kensington constituency. This proposal was the first to suggest a split between the two Cities in Parliamentary elections since they were joined and proved unpopular in consultation; the Boundary Commission revised them to return the link between the City of London and the City of Westminster, although the review was subsequently placed on hiatus.

In 2016, the Boundary Commission produced a second attempt at the Sixth Periodic Review. Its proposed Cities of London and Westminster comprises the City attached to Regent's Park and Abbey Road to the north-west, Knightsbridge/Belgravia to the west, and Holborn/Covent Garden to the north.

=== London Assembly constituency ===
Although united for parliamentary elections, in the London Assembly, the City of London is covered by the City and East constituency, and the area in Westminster by the West Central constituency. The Local Government Commission for England argued that "combining the City of London with areas to its east could assist in focussing regeneration eastwards" and linked it with the London Borough of Tower Hamlets, the London Borough of Newham, and the London Borough of Barking and Dagenham.

== Boundaries ==
The seat covers the entire City of London and most of the City of Westminster lying South of the Marylebone Road and the Westway. In the latter, more residential, city it covers Westminster, Pimlico, Victoria, Belgravia, Knightsbridge, St. James's, Soho, most of Covent Garden, alongside parts of Fitzrovia, Marylebone, Edgware Road, Paddington and Bayswater.

=== Historic ===
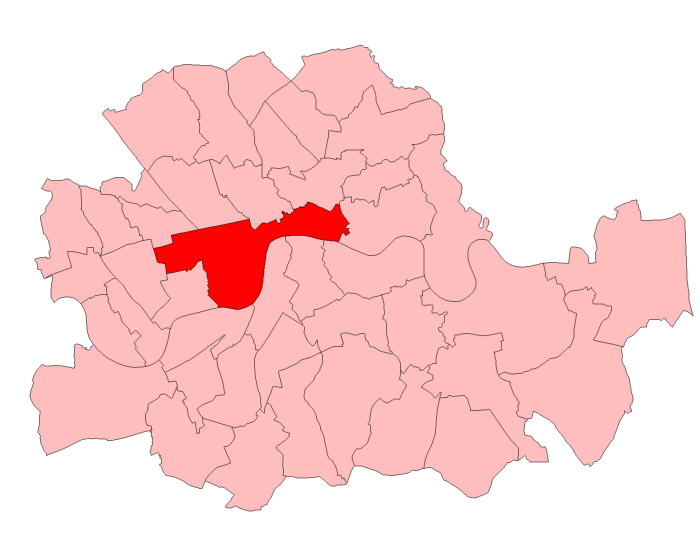
Cities of London and Westminster in the Parliamentary County of London, showing boundaries used from 1950 to 1974

1950–1974: From the Metropolitan Borough of Westminster: Charing Cross, Covent Garden, Great Marlborough Conduit, Grosvenor, Hamlet of Knightsbridge, Knightsbridge St. George, Pall Mall, Regent, St. Anne, St. John, St. Margaret, Strand.

In 1959, the boundaries changed, and the wards used instead were Abbey, Alderney, Aldwych, Berkeley, Cathedral, Churchill, Covent Garden, Dolphin, Eaton, Ebury, Grosvenor, Knightsbridge, Millbank, Regent Street, St. James's, Soho, Tachbrook, Victoria, Warwick and Wilton. In 1964, the City of Westminster was created to replace the old Metropolitan Borough of Westminster, which kept the same wards.

The City of London consisted of Aldersgate, Aldgate, Bassishaw, Bassishaw, Billingsgate, Bishopsgate, Bread Street, Bridge Within, Bridge Without, Broad Street, Candlewick, Castle Baynard, Cheap, Coleman Street, Cordwainer, Cornhill, Cripplegate, Dowgate, Farringdon Within, Farringdon Without, Langbourn, Lime Street, Portsoken, Queenhithe, Tower, Vintry and Walbrook.

In 1968, the City of Westminster ward boundaries changed, with the following used for this seat: Charing Cross, Churchill, Knightsbridge, Millbank, Regent Street, Victoria Street and Warwick.

1974–1997: The City of Westminster wards as above, and the City of London, as above.

New boundaries from 1978 meant the following wards from the City of Westminster were used: Baker Street, Belgrave, Bryanston, Cavendish, Churchill, Hyde Park, Knightsbridge, Millbank, St George's, St James's, Victoria, and West End.

In the City of London, Bridge Within and Bridge Without were combined in 1978 to create Bridge.

1997–2010: The City of Westminster wards as above, plus, Bayswater and Lancaster Gate, and the City of London.

In 2002, a Local Government Boundary Commission for England review abolished the Baker Street, Belgrave, Bryanston, Cavendish, Knightsbridge, Millbank, St James's and Victoria wards.

For the 2005 general election, the Westminster electoral wards used in this constituency were Bayswater (part), Bryanston and Dorset Square (part), Churchill, Hyde Park, Knightsbridge and Belgravia, Lancaster Gate, Marylebone High Street, St James's, Tachbrook, Vincent Square, Warwick and West End.

2010–2024: The City of Westminster wards of Bryanston and Dorset Square, Churchill, Hyde Park, Knightsbridge and Belgravia, Marylebone High Street, St James's, Tachbrook, Vincent Square, Warwick, and West End, and the City of London.

=== Current ===
Following the 2023 review of Westminster constituencies, which came into effect for the 2024 general election, the constituency is composed of the City of London and the following wards of the City of Westminster:

- Abbey Road; Hyde Park; Knightsbridge & Belgravia; Marylebone; Pimlico North; Pimlico South; Regent's Park; St James's; Vincent Square; West End.

The new boundaries reflect the local authority boundary review which came into effect in May 2022. The seat was expanded to bring the electorate within the permitted range by adding the Abbey Road and Regent's Park wards which were previously in the abolished constituency of Westminster North.

== Constituency profile ==
The Cities of London and Westminster seat contains the two historical centres of the capital. The City of London is an international financial centre, while Westminster, home to Buckingham Palace, the Houses of Parliament, Whitehall and 10 Downing Street, represents Britain's political centre.

The seat includes iconic landmarks such as St Paul's Cathedral, the West End's Theatreland and Soho. Some of the country's wealthiest residents live in exclusive Mayfair, Belgravia and Knightsbridge. Less than half the population were born in the UK - a fifth hail from elsewhere in Europe, while one in twenty is American, according to the 2011 Census.

Around half of the electorate are in the more socially mixed areas of Paddington and Pimlico, which includes some large council estates (Churchill Gardens and Millbank Estate).

The constituency also incorporates the wards of the City of London, some of which are the least populated wards in the United Kingdom, such as Coleman Street ward, which has a total electorate of 2, and Aldgate ward, which has a total electorate of 27.

== Members of Parliament ==
| Election | Member | Party |
|---|---|---|
| 1950 | Sir Harold Webbe | Conservative |
| 1959 | Sir Harry Hylton-Foster | Conservative |
| 1959 | Sir Harry Hylton-Foster | Speaker |
| 1965 by-election | John Smith | Conservative |
| 1970 (Note: Constituency renamed 'City of London and Westminster South' in 1974.) | Sir Christopher Tugendhat | Conservative |
| 1977 by-election (Note: Constituency renamed 'Cities of London and Westminster' in 1997.) | Peter Brooke | Conservative |
| 2001 | Mark Field | Conservative |
| 2019 | Nickie Aiken | Conservative |
| 2024 | Rachel Blake | Labour Co-op |

== Election results ==
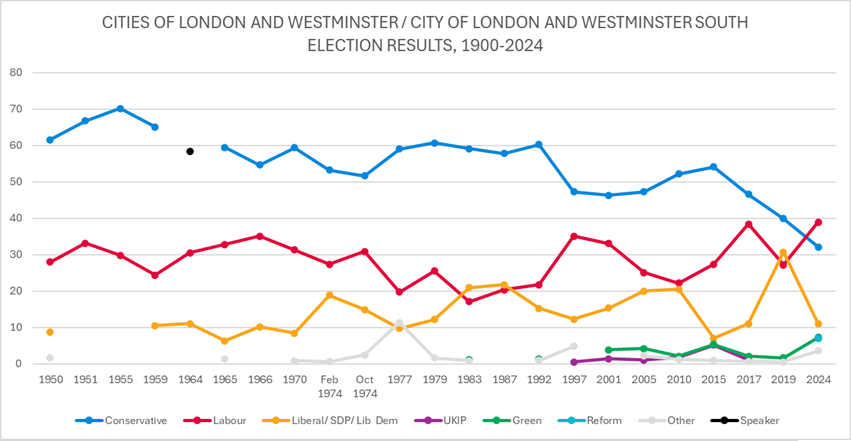
Election results 1950–2024

Named Cities of London and Westminster from 1997 to date

=== Elections in the 2020s ===
General election 2024: Cities of London and Westminster
| Party | Candidate | Votes | % | ±% |
|---|---|---|---|---|
| Labour Co-op | Rachel Blake | 15,302 | 39.0 | ▲10.1 |
| Conservative | Tim Barnes | 12,594 | 32.1 | ▼8.2 |
| Liberal Democrats | Edward Lucas | 4,335 | 11.1 | ▼17.1 |
| Green | Rajiv Sinha | 2,844 | 7.3 | ▲5.4 |
| Reform | Tarun Ghulati | 2,752 | 7.0 | ▲6.8 |
| Workers Party | Hoz Shafiei | 727 | 1.9 | N/A |
| Rejoin EU | Liz Burford | 352 | 0.9 | N/A |
| SDP | Hugo de Burgh | 110 | 0.3 | N/A |
| Independent | John Generic | 110 | 0.3 | N/A |
| Independent | Tim Hallett | 55 | 0.1 | N/A |
| Independent | Matthew Carr | 34 | 0.1 | N/A |
| Majority | | 2,708 | 6.9 | N/A |
| Turnout | | 39,215 | 53.5 | −17.8 |
| Registered electors | | 73,369 | | |
| Labour Co-op gain from Conservative | | Swing | ▲9.2 | |

=== Elections in the 2010s ===
2019 notional result (Note: Estimate of the 2019 general election result as if the revised boundaries recommended under the 2023 boundary review were in place)
| Party | Vote | % |
|---|---|---|
| Conservative | 21,020 | 40.3 |
| Labour | 15,044 | 28.9 |
| Liberal Democrats | 14,713 | 28.2 |
| Green | 1,010 | 1.9 |
| Others | 226 | 0.4 |
| Brexit Party | 103 | 0.2 |
| Majority | 5,596 | 11.5 |
| Turnout | 52,116 | 71.3 |
| Electorate | 73,140 | |

General election 2019: Cities of London and Westminster
| Party | Candidate | Votes | % | ±% |
|---|---|---|---|---|
| Conservative | Nickie Aiken | 17,049 | 39.9 | −6.7 |
| Liberal Democrats | Chuka Umunna | 13,096 | 30.7 | +19.6 |
| Labour | Gordon Nardell | 11,624 | 27.2 | −11.2 |
| Green | Zack Polanski | 728 | 1.7 | −0.4 |
| CPA | Jill McLachlan | 125 | 0.3 | N/A |
| Liberal | Dirk van Heck | 101 | 0.2 | N/A |
| Majority | | 3,953 | 9.2 | +1.0 |
| Turnout | | 42,723 | 67.1 | +4.3 |
| Registered electors | | 63,700 | | |
| Conservative hold | | Swing | | |

General election 2017: Cities of London and Westminster
| Party | Candidate | Votes | % | ±% |
|---|---|---|---|---|
| Conservative | Mark Field | 18,005 | 46.6 | −7.5 |
| Labour | Ibrahim Dogus | 14,857 | 38.4 | +11.0 |
| Liberal Democrats | Bridget Fox | 4,270 | 11.1 | +4.1 |
| Green | Lawrence McNally | 821 | 2.1 | −3.3 |
| UKIP | Anil Bhatti | 426 | 1.1 | −4.1 |
| Independent | Tim Lord | 173 | 0.4 | N/A |
| One Love | Ankit Love | 59 | 0.2 | N/A |
| Young People's | Benjamin Weenen | 43 | 0.1 | N/A |
| Majority | | 3,148 | 8.2 | −18.5 |
| Turnout | | 38,654 | 62.8 | +3.5 |
| Registered electors | | 61,533 | | |
| Conservative hold | | Swing | −9.3 | |

General election 2015: Cities of London and Westminster
| Party | Candidate | Votes | % | ±% |
|---|---|---|---|---|
| Conservative | Mark Field | 19,570 | 54.1 | +1.9 |
| Labour | Nik Slingsby | 9,899 | 27.4 | +5.2 |
| Liberal Democrats | Belinda Brooks-Gordon | 2,521 | 7.0 | −13.5 |
| Green | Hugh Small | 1,953 | 5.4 | +3.3 |
| UKIP | Robert Stephenson | 1,894 | 5.2 | +3.4 |
| CISTA | Edouard-Henri Desforges | 160 | 0.4 | N/A |
| CPA | Jill McLachlan | 129 | 0.4 | N/A |
| Class War | Adam Clifford | 59 | 0.2 | N/A |
| Majority | | 9,671 | 26.7 | −3.3 |
| Turnout | | 36,185 | 59.3 | +3.8 |
| Registered electors | | 60,992 | | |
| Conservative hold | | Swing | −1.6 | |

General election 2010: Cities of London and Westminster
| Party | Candidate | Votes | % | ±% |
|---|---|---|---|---|
| Conservative | Mark Field | 19,264 | 52.2 | +3.9 |
| Labour | Dave Rowntree | 8,188 | 22.2 | −3.1 |
| Liberal Democrats | Naomi Smith | 7,574 | 20.5 | +2.0 |
| Green | Derek Chase | 778 | 2.1 | −2.2 |
| UKIP | Paul Weston | 664 | 1.8 | +0.7 |
| English Democrat | Frank Roseman | 191 | 0.5 | N/A |
| Independent | Dennis Delderfield | 98 | 0.3 | N/A |
| Pirate | Jack Nunn | 90 | 0.2 | N/A |
| Independent | Mad Cap'n Tom | 84 | 0.2 | N/A |
| Majority | | 11,076 | 30.0 | +7.8 |
| Turnout | | 36,931 | 55.5 | +4.4 |
| Registered electors | | 66,849 | | |
| Conservative hold | | Swing | +3.5 | |

=== Elections in the 2000s ===
General election 2005: Cities of London and Westminster
| Party | Candidate | Votes | % | ±% |
|---|---|---|---|---|
| Conservative | Mark Field | 17,260 | 47.3 | +1.0 |
| Labour | Hywel Lloyd | 9,165 | 25.1 | −8.0 |
| Liberal Democrats | Marie-Louise Rossi | 7,306 | 20.0 | +4.6 |
| Green | Tristan Smith | 1,544 | 4.2 | +0.3 |
| UKIP | Colin Merton | 399 | 1.1 | −0.3 |
| Independent | Brian Haw | 298 | 0.8 | N/A |
| CPA | Jillian McLachlan | 246 | 0.7 | N/A |
| Veritas | David Harris | 218 | 0.6 | N/A |
| Independent | Cass Cass-Horne | 51 | 0.1 | N/A |
| Majority | | 8,095 | 22.2 | +9.0 |
| Turnout | | 36,487 | 50.3 | +3.1 |
| Registered electors | | 71,935 | | |
| Conservative hold | | Swing | +4.5 | |

General election 2001: Cities of London and Westminster
| Party | Candidate | Votes | % | ±% |
|---|---|---|---|---|
| Conservative | Mark Field | 15,737 | 46.3 | −1.0 |
| Labour | Michael Katz | 11,238 | 33.1 | −2.0 |
| Liberal Democrats | Martin Horwood | 5,218 | 15.4 | +3.1 |
| Green | Hugo Charlton | 1,318 | 3.9 | N/A |
| UKIP | Colin Merton | 464 | 1.4 | +0.9 |
| Majority | | 4,499 | 13.2 | +1.0 |
| Turnout | | 33,975 | 47.2 | −7.0 |
| Registered electors | | 71,935 | | |
| Conservative hold | | Swing | +0.5 | |

=== Elections in the 1990s ===
General election 1997: Cities of London and Westminster
| Party | Candidate | Votes | % | ±% |
|---|---|---|---|---|
| Conservative | Peter Brooke | 18,981 | 47.3 | −12.0 |
| Labour | Kate Green | 14,100 | 35.1 | +11.0 |
| Liberal Democrats | Michael Dumigan | 4,933 | 12.3 | −1.8 |
| Referendum | Alan Walters | 1,161 | 2.9 | N/A |
| Independent | Patricia Wharton | 266 | 0.7 | N/A |
| UKIP | Colin Merton | 215 | 0.5 | N/A |
| Natural Law | Richard Johnson | 176 | 0.4 | +0.1 |
| Monster Raving Loony | Nicholas Walsh | 138 | 0.3 | −0.1 |
| Hemp Coalition | Gordon Webster | 112 | 0.3 | N/A |
| Rainbow Dream Ticket | Jerry Sadowitz | 73 | 0.2 | N/A |
| Majority | | 4,881 | 12.2 | −26.3 |
| Turnout | | 40,155 | 54.2 | −8.9 |
| Registered electors | | 74,035 | | |
| Conservative hold | | Swing | −11.5 | |

Named City of London and Westminster South between 1974 and 1997

General election 1992: City of London and Westminster South
| Party | Candidate | Votes | % | ±% |
|---|---|---|---|---|
| Conservative | Peter Brooke | 20,938 | 60.3 | +2.5 |
| Labour | Charlie Smith | 7,569 | 21.8 | +1.4 |
| Liberal Democrats | Jane Smithard | 5,392 | 15.3 | −6.5 |
| Green | Guy Herbert | 458 | 1.3 | N/A |
| Monster Raving Loony | Peter Stockton | 147 | 0.4 | N/A |
| Irish Freedom Movement | Alex Farrell | 107 | 0.3 | N/A |
| Natural Law | Richard Johnson | 101 | 0.3 | N/A |
| Majority | | 13,369 | 38.5 | +2.5 |
| Turnout | | 34,712 | 63.1 | +4.9 |
| Registered electors | | 55,021 | | |
| Conservative hold | | Swing | | |

=== Elections in the 1980s ===
General election 1987: City of London and Westminster South
| Party | Candidate | Votes | % | ±% |
|---|---|---|---|---|
| Conservative | Peter Brooke | 19,333 | 57.8 | −1.3 |
| Liberal | Jane Smithard | 7,291 | 21.8 | +0.8 |
| Labour | Ruth Bush | 6,821 | 20.4 | +3.3 |
| Majority | | 12,042 | 36.0 | −2.1 |
| Turnout | | 33,445 | 58.2 | +6.4 |
| Registered electors | | 57,428 | | |
| Conservative hold | | Swing | −1.1 | |

General election 1983: City of London and Westminster South
| Party | Candidate | Votes | % | ±% |
|---|---|---|---|---|
| Conservative | Peter Brooke | 20,754 | 59.1 | −1.6 |
| Liberal | Adrian Walker-Smith | 7,367 | 21.0 | +8.8 |
| Labour | Stephen Jones | 6,013 | 17.1 | −8.4 |
| Ecology | Roger Shorter | 419 | 1.2 | N/A |
| National Front | Anthony Reeve | 258 | 0.7 | −1.0 |
| Communist | A. W. Spence | 161 | 0.5 | N/A |
| Independent - Pro Nuclear War Gay Rights | Victor Litvin | 147 | 0.4 | N/A |
| Majority | | 13,387 | 38.1 | +2.9 |
| Turnout | | 35,119 | 51.8 | −3.4 |
| Registered electors | | 67,773 | | |
| Conservative hold | | Swing | | |

=== Elections in the 1970s ===
General election 1979: City of London and Westminster South
| Party | Candidate | Votes | % | ±% |
|---|---|---|---|---|
| Conservative | Peter Brooke | 16,851 | 60.7 | +9.0 |
| Labour | Russell Profitt | 7,067 | 25.5 | −5.4 |
| Liberal | Harry Ball-Wilson | 3,375 | 12.2 | −2.7 |
| National Front | Kenneth Mathews | 478 | 1.7 | −0.8 |
| Majority | | 9,784 | 35.2 | +14.4 |
| Turnout | | 27,771 | 55.2 | +2.0 |
| Registered electors | | 50,357 | | |
| Conservative hold | | Swing | +7.2 | |

1979 figure changes based on the October 1974 election, not the 1977 by-election.

1977 City of London and Westminster South by-election
| Party | Candidate | Votes | % | ±% |
|---|---|---|---|---|
| Conservative | Peter Brooke | 11,962 | 59.07 | +7.35 |
| Labour | Malcolm Noble | 3,997 | 19.74 | −11.21 |
| Liberal | Angus Scrimgeour | 1,981 | 9.78 | −5.07 |
| National Front | Paul Kavanagh | 1,051 | 5.19 | +2.72 |
| Pro-Homosexual Civil Rights | Peter Mitchel | 449 | 2.22 | N/A |
| National Party | Michael Lobb | 364 | 1.80 | N/A |
| New Britain | Dennis Delderfield | 306 | 1.51 | N/A |
| Air, Road, Public Safety, White Resident | Bill Boaks | 61 | 0.30 | N/A |
| Christian Outreach to Britain, Anti-Pornography | William Thompson | 43 | 0.21 | N/A |
| Christ, Crown, Country, Commonwealth, Christian Constitution | Ralph Herbert | 37 | 0.18 | N/A |
| Majority | | 7,965 | 39.33 | +18.56 |
| Turnout | | 20,251 | 39.60 | −13.60 |
| Conservative hold | | Swing | +9.28 | |

General election October 1974: City of London and Westminster South
| Party | Candidate | Votes | % | ±% |
|---|---|---|---|---|
| Conservative | Christopher Tugendhat | 14,350 | 51.7 | −1.5 |
| Labour | Phil Turner | 8,589 | 30.9 | +3.5 |
| Liberal | T. G. Underwood | 4,122 | 14.9 | −4.0 |
| National Front | D. Baxter | 686 | 2.5 | N/A |
| Majority | | 5,761 | 20.8 | −5.1 |
| Turnout | | 27,747 | 53.2 | −8.2 |
| Registered electors | | 52,170 | | |
| Conservative hold | | Swing | −2.5 | |

General election February 1974: City of London and Westminster South
| Party | Candidate | Votes | % | ±% |
|---|---|---|---|---|
| Conservative | Christopher Tugendhat | 16,945 | 53.3 | −6.1 |
| Labour | Phil Turner | 8,698 | 27.4 | −3.9 |
| Liberal | T. G. Underwood | 6,015 | 18.9 | +10.5 |
| Ind. Conservative | C. D. Wertheim | 134 | 0.4 | N/A |
| Independent | R. E. Eckley | 44 | 0.1 | N/A |
| Independent | W. G. Boaks | 35 | 0.1 | N/A |
| Majority | | 8,247 | 25.9 | −2.2 |
| Turnout | | 31,871 | 61.4 | +6.9 |
| Registered electors | | 51,943 | | |
| Conservative hold | | Swing | −1.1 | |

Named from 1950 to 1974 Cities of London and Westminster

General election 1970: Cities of London and Westminster
| Party | Candidate | Votes | % | ±% |
|---|---|---|---|---|
| Conservative | Christopher Tugendhat | 19,102 | 59.4 | +4.7 |
| Labour | Alf Dubs | 10,062 | 31.3 | −3.8 |
| Liberal | David Nicholson | 2,708 | 8.4 | −1.8 |
| Independent - Anti-Labour | Willoughby Clark | 157 | 0.5 | N/A |
| Independent - Young Ideas | Lord Sutch | 142 | 0.4 | N/A |
| Majority | | 9,040 | 28.1 | +8.5 |
| Turnout | | 32,186 | 54.5 | −5.5 |
| Registered electors | | 58,987 | | |
| Conservative hold | | Swing | +4.3 | |

=== Elections in the 1960s ===
General election 1966: Cities of London and Westminster
| Party | Candidate | Votes | % | ±% |
|---|---|---|---|---|
| Conservative | John Smith | 19,242 | 54.7 | −3.67 |
| Labour | Alexander Pringle | 12,349 | 35.1 | +4.52 |
| Liberal | Thomas Houston | 3,576 | 10.2 | −0.85 |
| Majority | | 6,893 | 19.6 | −8.19 |
| Turnout | | 35,167 | 60.0 | +0.34 |
| Registered electors | | 58,630 | | |
| Conservative hold | | Swing | −4.1 | |

1965 Cities of London and Westminster by-election
| Party | Candidate | Votes | % | ±% |
|---|---|---|---|---|
| Conservative | John Smith | 15,037 | 59.53 | +1.16 |
| Labour | Alexander Pringle | 8,300 | 32.86 | +2.28 |
| Liberal | Stephen Jakobi | 1,595 | 6.32 | −4.73 |
| Independent | Desmond Burgess | 326 | 1.29 | N/A |
| Majority | | 6,737 | 26.47 | −1.32 |
| Turnout | | 25,258 | 41.80 | −17.86 |
| Registered electors | | | | |
| Conservative hold | | Swing | | |

General election 1964: Cities of London and Westminster
| Party | Candidate | Votes | % | ±% |
|---|---|---|---|---|
| Speaker | Harry Hylton-Foster | 21,588 | 58.37 | −6.73 |
| Labour | Ronald Wallace | 11,309 | 30.58 | +6.18 |
| Liberal | John W Derry | 4,087 | 11.05 | +0.55 |
| Majority | | 10,279 | 27.79 | −12.91 |
| Turnout | | 36,984 | 59.66 | −1.64 |
| Registered electors | | 61,988 | | |
| Speaker hold | | Swing | | |

=== Elections in the 1950s ===
General election 1959: Cities of London and Westminster
| Party | Candidate | Votes | % | ±% |
|---|---|---|---|---|
| Conservative | Harry Hylton-Foster | 27,489 | 65.1 | −5.1 |
| Labour | Will Howie | 10,301 | 24.4 | −5.4 |
| Liberal | Derek Monsey | 4,409 | 10.5 | N/A |
| Majority | | 17,188 | 40.7 | +0.2 |
| Turnout | | 42,199 | 61.3 | +1.2 |
| Registered electors | | 68,896 | | |
| Conservative hold | | Swing | +0.2 | |

General election 1955: Cities of London and Westminster
| Party | Candidate | Votes | % | ±% |
|---|---|---|---|---|
| Conservative | Harold Webbe | 31,314 | 70.2 | +3.4 |
| Labour | Dennis Nisbet | 13,270 | 29.8 | −3.4 |
| Majority | | 18,044 | 40.5 | +6.9 |
| Turnout | | 44,584 | 60.1 | −7.1 |
| Registered electors | | 74,162 | | |
| Conservative hold | | Swing | +3.4 | |

General election 1951: Cities of London and Westminster
| Party | Candidate | Votes | % | ±% |
|---|---|---|---|---|
| Conservative | Harold Webbe | 35,275 | 66.8 | +5.2 |
| Labour | Hugh Sutherland | 17,527 | 33.2 | +5.2 |
| Majority | | 17,738 | 33.6 | ±0.0 |
| Turnout | | 52,802 | 67.2 | +5.2 |
| Registered electors | | 78,628 | | |
| Conservative hold | | Swing | ±0.0 | |

General election 1950: Cities of London and Westminster
| Party | Candidate | Votes | % |
|---|---|---|---|
| Conservative | Harold Webbe | 32,672 | 61.6 |
| Labour | John Lewis Curthoys | 14,849 | 28.0 |
| Liberal | Jacob Arthur Gorsky | 4,670 | 8.8 |
| Communist | Bill Carritt | 888 | 1.7 |
| Majority | | 17,823 | 33.6 |
| Turnout | | 53,079 | 72.4 |
| Registered electors | | 73,316 | |
| Conservative win (new seat) | | | |

== See also ==
- Parliamentary constituencies in London

== Notes ==
Parliament of the United Kingdom
| Preceded by Cirencester and Tewkesbury | Constituency represented by the speaker 1959–1965 | Succeeded by Southampton Itchen |
