= Denys Henderson =

British businessman (1932–2016)

Sir Denys Henderson
- Born: Denys Hartley Henderson; 11 October 1932; Colombo, British Ceylon (present-day Sri Lanka)
- Died: 21 May 2016 (aged 83)
- Occupation: Company director

Sir Denys Hartley Henderson (11 October 1932 – 21 May 2016) was a British businessman. He was chairman of ICI from 1987 to 1995.

== Life and career ==
=== Early life ===
Henderson was born on 11 October 1932, in Colombo, Sri Lanka, where his father was a tea planter. The family returned to Scotland and Henderson went to school in Aberdeen and graduated from the University of Aberdeen in 1955 in Arts and Law with an MA and an LL.B.

=== National Service ===
Henderson trained as a solicitor but never practised at a law firm. He says that it was his National Service that finally convinced him to use his legal training, by showing him a side of the law which he could never aspire to in civvy street. He was a captain in the directorate of army legal services and for 18 months acted as a prosecuting attorney handling everything from fraud, assault and attempted murder to what he has described, with great delicacy, as "various unnatural offences". After that kind of drama he said there was no way he could face the tedium of a provincial solicitor's office where wills and small debt summonses would be the highlights of life.

=== Imperial Chemical Industries ===
Henderson joined the secretary's department at ICI head office in 1957 and was paid £900 a year. He said "The honest truth is I just wanted a job that paid the rent" adding that "I found the change from having a huge amount of personal initiative and personal responsibility as a prosecuting officer to being a 'scrubber' in the secretary's department not very stimulating – I made one or two attempts to leave but never did." He went on to hold various ICI legal posts including at Paints and after taking on various commercial roles went on to become Chairman of the Paints division in 1977, a position he held until 1980 when he joined the main ICI board.

Henderson joined the main ICI board in 1980 and was appointed deputy chairman in 1986, succeeding Sir John Harvey-Jones as chairman a year later. He was instrumental in implementing a major streamlining of ICI to help it ride out the recession and face up to the tough competition of the 1990s, including a severe belt tightening and decentralised organisation with a lot of authority delegated to the chief executives who ran the individual businesses.

In recognition of his service to not only his business but his country, Henderson was created a Knight Bachelor in the 1989 Birthday Honours.

On 15 May 1991, Hanson disclosed that it had purchased about 20 million, or 2.8 percent, of ICI's shares, leading to speculation of a possible takeover of what was at the time the UK's third-largest company. A management team headed by Henderson and Frank Whitely, its deputy chairman, led the takeover-defense plan against Lord Hanson, the chairman of Hanson, and his partner, Sir Gordon White (later Lord White of Hull), enlisting the help of S. G. Warburg & Co, the British investment bank, and Goldman, Sachs & Company, the American investment bank. Lord Hanson was forced to back down from the takeover.

Henderson was also in charge when ICI split in two in June 1993 to create Zeneca. He said "the demerger will produce two powerful, focused new companies able to concentrate even more on strengthening their leading positions in world markets". Henderson was also chairman of the Zeneca Group from 1993 until 1995.

Henderson was awarded an honorary doctorate in law in 1993 by the University of Bath.

=== Life after ICI ===
In March 1995 Henderson was appointed chairman of Rank Organisation a position he held until he retired at the April 2001 AGM. He was also chairman of Dalgety plc from 1995 to 1997, First 'Crown Estate' Commissioner and chairman from 1995 to 2002 and has also held a number of non-executive directorships, including at Barclays' Bank (1990 to 1995), Rio Tinto Zinc (1990 to 1996), Schlumberger (1995 to 2001), Market & Opinion Research International Ltd (MORI) (2000 to 2002) and QinetiQ (2003 to 2005). Henderson was appointed to the Greenbury committee in 1995, which reported on the topic of executive remuneration.

In an interview in 2002 Henderson said that nowadays, in a public company, 70 is the end of the road. "Everybody should have his 15 minutes of fame," he says, "but I think this is a time to call it quits." He also said

I was brought up as an ICI man. I loved the company

Henderson was appointed a non-executive director of AZ Electronic Materials by The Carlyle Group following its acquisition of the company in 2004.

He died on 21 May 2016.

Academic offices
Preceded by Lord Kearton	Chancellor of the University of Bath; 1992–1998	Succeeded by Lord Tugendhat
