= 1965 Cities of London and Westminster by-election =

UK Parliamentary by-election

The 1965 Cities of London and Westminster by-election on 4 November 1965 was held after the death of Conservative MP and Speaker of the House of Commons Harry Hylton-Foster.

The seat was safe, having been won at the 1964 United Kingdom general election by over 10,000 votes. The Conservative Party held the seat.

Labour's by-election candidate Alexander Pringle was a Chelsea borough councillor and Head of English at Westminster City School. He was the son of William Pringle, who had been a Liberal MP from 1910 to 1918 and 1922 to 1924.

== Result of the previous general election ==
General election 1964: Cities of London and Westminster
Party	Candidate	Votes	%	±%
Speaker	Harry Hylton-Foster	21,588	58.37	−6.73
Labour	Ronald Wallace	11,309	30.58	+6.18
Liberal	John W Derry	4,087	11.05	+0.55
Majority		10,279	27.79	−12.91
Turnout		36,984	59.66	−1.64
Registered electors		61,988		
Speaker gain from Conservative		Swing		

== Result of the by-election ==
By-election 1965: Cities of London and Westminster
Party	Candidate	Votes	%	±%
Conservative	John Smith	15,037	59.53	+1.16
Labour	Alexander Pringle	8,300	32.86	+2.28
Liberal	Stephen Jakobi	1,595	6.32	−4.73
Independent	Desmond Burgess	326	1.29	New
Majority		6,737	26.47	−1.32
Turnout		25,258	41.80	−17.86
Registered electors				
Conservative gain from Speaker		Swing	-0.6	
