= John Stanley (Tonbridge and Malling MP) =

British politician (1942–2025)

The Right Honourable Sir John Stanley

Minister of State for Northern Ireland
- In office 13 June 1987 – 25 July 1988
- Prime Minister: Margaret Thatcher
- Preceded by: Nicholas Scott
- Succeeded by: Ian Stewart

Minister of State for the Armed Forces
- In office 13 June 1983 – 13 June 1987
- Prime Minister: Margaret Thatcher
- Preceded by: Peter Blaker
- Succeeded by: Ian Stewart

Minister of State for Housing and Construction
- In office 7 May 1979 – 13 June 1983
- Prime Minister: Margaret Thatcher
- Preceded by: John Silkin
- Succeeded by: Ian Gow

Member of Parliament for Tonbridge and Malling
- In office 28 February 1974 – 30 March 2015
- Preceded by: Constituency established
- Succeeded by: Tom Tugendhat

Personal details
- Born: 19 January 1942 Marylebone, London, England
- Died: 28 November 2025 (aged 83)
- Party: Conservative
- Spouse: Susan Giles
- Education: Lincoln College, Oxford

Sir John Paul Stanley (19 January 1942 – 28 November 2025) was a British Conservative Party politician who was the Member of Parliament (MP) for Tonbridge and Malling from 1974 to 2015.

== Early life and education ==
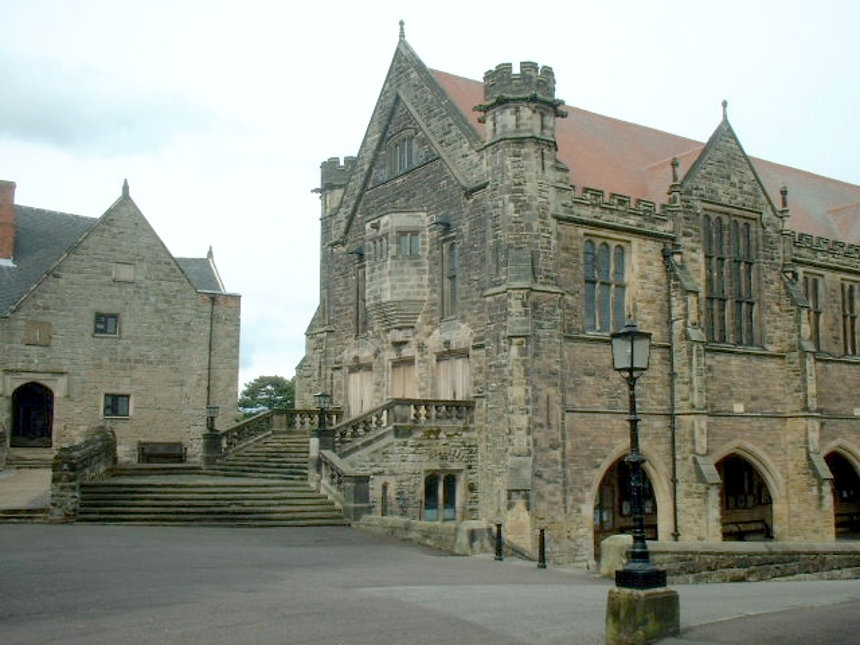
Repton School

Stanley was born on 19 January 1942. He was educated at two independent schools: at Copthorne Preparatory School near Crawley in West Sussex and Repton School in the village of Repton in Derbyshire, followed by Lincoln College, Oxford, where he read Modern History. Stanley also studied at Syracuse University.

== Early career ==
Stanley was at the Institute for Strategic Studies from 1968 to 1969. He worked for Rio Tinto-Zinc Corp Ltd (RTZ) from 1969 to 1979. He was a Senior Network Member at the European Leadership Network (ELN).

== Parliamentary career ==
Stanley contested the Newton seat in 1970. He was first elected to Parliament at the February 1974 election, prior to which he had worked for the Conservative Research Department as an advisor on housing policy. He was Parliamentary Private Secretary to Margaret Thatcher from 1976 to 1979, during her time as Leader of the Opposition.

He was made Minister of State with responsibility for housing at the Department of the Environment following the Conservative victory at the 1979 general election. Four years later, he was moved to become Minister of State for the Armed Forces in the Ministry of Defence. Following the 1987 general election, Stanley was moved to the Northern Ireland Office, once again as Minister of State, but left the government front bench in 1988 and remained on the back benches thereafter. He was mainly interested in defence and foreign policy, having sat on the Foreign Affairs Select Committee from 1992 onwards.

He was re-adopted as the Conservative party candidate for his constituency in 2008 for the 2010 general election. In March 2012, Stanley announced that he would stand down at the next general election.

In May 2014, The Independent reported that Stanley had received fees worth thousands of pounds for consultancy work for one of the big City investors who were granted priority access to shares in Royal Mail, which the Coalition government had decided to privatise.

In July 2023, declassified UK government documents from the period after the 11 September 2001 attacks in the USA showed that Stanley had warned the then Prime Minister, Tony Blair, that there was a high risk of terrorist attacks in the UK, possibly even using a 'dirty bomb' or other acquired weapon of mass destruction. Stanley urged Blair to strengthen domestic UK security and improve civil defence preparedness.

== Personal life and death ==
Stanley married Susan Giles on 21 December 1968 in the City of London; they later divorced. The couple had two sons and one daughter.

Stanley died on 28 November 2025, at the age of 83.

== Honours ==
- Stanley was sworn in as a member of the Privy Council on 16 June 1984. This was announced in the 1984 Queen's Birthday Honours. This gave him the Honorific Prefix "Right Honourable" for Life
- He was knighted on 13 December 1988. This allowed him to be referred to as "Sir John Stanley"

Parliament of the United Kingdom
New constituency	Member of Parliament for Tonbridge and Malling; 1974–2015	Succeeded by Tom Tugendhat
