= Tonbridge and Malling (constituency) =

UK Parliament constituency (1974–2024)

- Former county constituency for the House of Commons
- Boundary of Tonbridge and Malling in Kent for the 2010 general election

- Location of Kent within England
- County: Kent
- Electorate: 72,671 (2015)
- Major settlements: Tonbridge, Edenbridge and West Malling

1974–2024
- Seats: One
- Created from: Sevenoaks, Tonbridge
- Replaced by: Tonbridge

Tonbridge and Malling was a constituency in western Kent, in South East England, in the House of Commons of the UK Parliament. It was represented for its entire creation since 1974 by members of the Conservative Party.

Further to the completion of the 2023 periodic review of Westminster constituencies, the seat was abolished. Subject to moderate boundary changes, it will be reformed as Tonbridge, to be first contested at the 2024 general election.

== History ==
The seat was created in 1974 from parts of the seats of Sevenoaks and Tonbridge.

== Boundaries ==
Map of boundaries 2010–2024

1974–1983: The Urban District of Tonbridge, the Rural District of Malling, and part of the Rural District of Tonbridge.

1983–1997: The District of Tonbridge and Malling.

1997–2010: The Borough of Tonbridge and Malling wards of Birling, Leybourne and Ryarsh, Borough Green, Cage Green, Castle, East Malling, East Peckham, Hadlow, Higham, Hildenborough, Ightham, Judd, Long Mill, Medway, Oast, Trench, Vauxhall, Wateringbury, West Malling, West Peckham and Mereworth, and Wrotham, and the District of Sevenoaks wards of Edenbridge North, Edenbridge South, Leigh, Penshurst and Fordcombe, and Somerden.

2010–2024: The Borough of Tonbridge and Malling wards of Borough Green and Long Mill, Cage Green, Castle, Downs, East Malling, East Peckham and Golden Green, Hadlow, Mereworth and West Peckham, Higham, Hildenborough, Ightham, Judd, Kings Hill, Medway, Trench, Vauxhall, Wateringbury, West Malling and Leybourne, and Wrotham, and the District of Sevenoaks wards of Cowden and Hever, Edenbridge North and East, Edenbridge South and West, Leigh and Chiddingstone Causeway, and Penshurst, Fordcombe and Chiddingstone.

The constituency was in the west of the county of Kent in south eastern England and included about two-thirds of the Borough of Tonbridge and Malling (the remainder being in the Chatham and Aylesford constituency), and parts of Sevenoaks District.

== Constituency profile ==
This safe Conservative seat was characterised by a large commuter population benefiting from good road and rail links to London. Light engineering, farming and local service industry sectors are represented alongside the public sector, skilled trades and some construction. Visitor attractions in the constituency include the River Medway, the Eden Valley Walk which covers Edenbridge and Penshurst, including Hever Castle, Chiddingstone Castle, Penshurst Place and Tonbridge Castle. In this seat are numerous oast houses and remaining Wealden woodlands.

Residents' wealth and house prices are both higher than the UK average.

== Members of Parliament ==
Election	Member	Party
Feb 1974	Sir John Stanley	Conservative
2015	Tom Tugendhat	Conservative
2024	constituency abolished	

== Elections ==
=== Elections in the 1970s ===
General election February 1974: Tonbridge and Malling
Party	Candidate	Votes	%	±%
Conservative	John Stanley	24,809	45.8	
Liberal	M Vann	14,701	27.1	
Labour	Jack Straw	14,683	27.1	
Majority		10,108	18.7	
Turnout		54,193	83.4	
Conservative win (new seat)				

General election October 1974: Tonbridge and Malling
Party	Candidate	Votes	%	±%
Conservative	John Stanley	23,188	46.8	+1.0
Labour	P. Knight	14,579	29.4	+2.3
Liberal	M. Vann	11,767	23.8	−3.3
Majority		8,609	17.4	−1.3
Turnout		49,534	75.5	−7.9
Conservative hold		Swing	-0.7	

General election 1979: Tonbridge and Malling
Party	Candidate	Votes	%	±%
Conservative	John Stanley	29,534	54.5	+7.7
Labour	R. Ackerley	13,282	24.5	−4.9
Liberal	G. Knopp	10,904	20.1	−3.7
National Front	G. Burnett	429	0.8	New
Majority		16,252	30.0	+12.6
Turnout		54,149	79.5	+4.0
Conservative hold		Swing	+6.3	

=== Elections in the 1980s ===
General election 1983: Tonbridge and Malling
Party	Candidate	Votes	%	±%
Conservative	John Stanley	30,417	56.1	+1.6
SDP	Roland JM Freeman	16,897	31.2	+11.1
Labour	David Bishop	6,896	12.7	−11.8
Majority		13,520	24.9	−5.1
Turnout		54,210	74.7	−4.8
Conservative hold		Swing	-4.8	

General election 1987: Tonbridge and Malling
Party	Candidate	Votes	%	±%
Conservative	John Stanley	33,990	56.9	+0.8
SDP	Michael Ward	17,561	29.4	−1.8
Labour	Derek Still	7,803	13.1	+0.4
BNP	Michael Easter	369	0.6	New
Majority		16,429	27.5	+2.6
Turnout		59,725	77.8	+3.1
Conservative hold		Swing	+1.3	

=== Elections in the 1990s ===
General election 1992: Tonbridge and Malling
Party	Candidate	Votes	%	±%
Conservative	John Stanley	36,542	57.2	+0.3
Liberal Democrats	Paul D. Roberts	14,984	23.5	−5.9
Labour	Margaret A. O'Neill	11,533	18.1	+5.0
Green	Jim Tidy	612	1.0	New
Natural Law	Janet I.R. Horvath	221	0.3	New
Majority		21,558	33.7	+6.2
Turnout		63,892	82.7	+4.9
Conservative hold		Swing	+3.1	

General election 1997: Tonbridge and Malling
Party	Candidate	Votes	%	±%
Conservative	John Stanley	23,640	48.0	−9.2
Labour	Barbara Withstandley	13,410	27.2	+9.1
Liberal Democrats	Keith Brown	9,467	19.2	−4.3
Referendum	John Scrivenor	2,005	4.1	New
UKIP	B. Bullen	502	1.0	New
Natural Law	Gerard Valente	205	0.4	+0.1
Majority		10,230	20.8	−12.9
Turnout		49,229	75.8	−6.9
Conservative hold		Swing	-9.2	

=== Elections in the 2000s ===
General election 2001: Tonbridge and Malling
Party	Candidate	Votes	%	±%
Conservative	John Stanley	20,956	49.4	+1.4
Labour	Victoria Hayman	12,706	29.9	+2.7
Liberal Democrats	Jean Canet	7,605	17.9	−1.3
UKIP	Lynne Croucher	1,169	2.8	+1.8
Majority		8,250	19.5	−1.3
Turnout		42,436	64.3	−11.5
Conservative hold		Swing	-0.7	

General election 2005: Tonbridge and Malling
Party	Candidate	Votes	%	±%
Conservative	John Stanley	24,357	52.9	+3.5
Labour	Victoria Hayman	11,005	23.9	−6.0
Liberal Democrats	John Barstow	8,980	19.5	+1.6
UKIP	Dave Waller	1,721	3.7	+0.9
Majority		13,352	29.0	+9.5
Turnout		46,063	67.3	+3.0
Conservative hold		Swing	+4.8	

=== Elections in the 2010s ===
General election 2010: Tonbridge and Malling
Party	Candidate	Votes	%	±%
Conservative	John Stanley	29,723	57.9	+5.1
Liberal Democrats	Elizabeth Simpson	11,545	22.5	+3.0
Labour	Daniel Griffiths	6,476	12.6	−11.2
UKIP	David Waller	1,911	3.7	−0.2
Green	Steve Dawe	764	1.5	New
National Front	Michael Easter	505	1.0	New
English Democrat	Lisa Rogers	390	0.8	New
Majority		18,178	35.4	+6.4
Turnout		51,314	71.5	+3.1
Conservative hold		Swing	+1.1	

General election 2015: Tonbridge and Malling
Party	Candidate	Votes	%	±%
Conservative	Tom Tugendhat	31,887	59.4	+1.5
UKIP	Robert Izzard	8,153	15.2	+11.5
Labour	Claire Leigh	7,604	14.2	+1.6
Liberal Democrats	Mary Varrall	3,660	6.8	−15.7
Green	Howard Porter	2,366	4.4	+2.9
Majority		23,734	44.2	+8.8
Turnout		53,670	73.8	+2.3
Conservative hold		Swing	−5.0	

General election 2017: Tonbridge and Malling
Party	Candidate	Votes	%	±%
Conservative	Tom Tugendhat	36,218	63.6	+4.2
Labour	Dylan Jones	12,710	22.3	+8.1
Liberal Democrats	Keith Miller	3,787	6.7	−0.1
Green	April Clark	2,335	4.1	−0.3
UKIP	Collin Bullen	1,857	3.3	−11.9
Majority		23,508	41.3	−2.9
Turnout		56,907	73.7	−0.1
Conservative hold		Swing	−2.0	

General election 2019: Tonbridge and Malling
Party	Candidate	Votes	%	±%
Conservative	Tom Tugendhat	35,784	62.8	−0.8
Liberal Democrats	Richard Morris	8,843	15.5	+8.8
Labour	Dylan Jones	8,286	14.5	−7.8
Green	April Clark	4,090	7.2	+3.1
Majority		26,941	47.3	+6.0
Turnout		57,003	73.7	0.0
Conservative hold		Swing		

== See also ==
- List of parliamentary constituencies in Kent (historic)
