= Widdington =

Village in Essex, England

Coordinates: 51°57′40″N 0°14′15″E

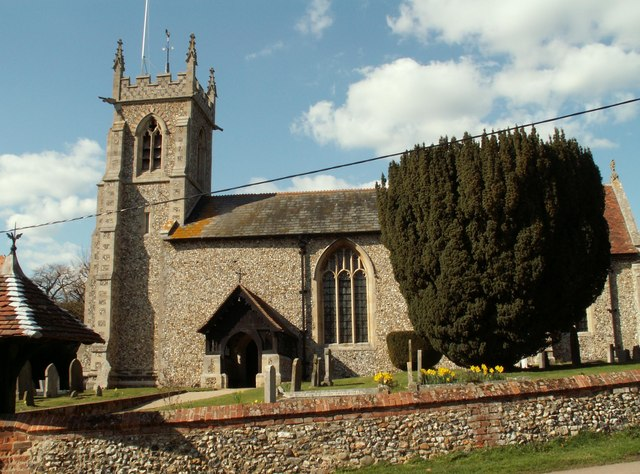
- St Mary's Church, Widdington

- Location within Essex
- Population: 502 (Parish, 2021)
- Civil parish: Widdington
- District: Uttlesford
- Shire county: Essex
- Region: East
- Country: England
- Sovereign state: United Kingdom
- Post town: SAFFRON WALDEN
- Postcode district: CB11
- Dialling code: 01799
- Police: Essex
- Fire: Essex
- Ambulance: East of England

Widdington is a village and civil parish in the Uttlesford district of Essex, England. It lies 4 miles (6 km) south of Saffron Walden, its post town. Widdington has a church dedicated to St Mary the Virgin. At the 2021 census the parish had a population of 502.

Prior's Hall, now a private residence, is a rare survival of a stone-built structure from the late tenth or early eleventh centuries; Prior's Hall barn, from the fourteenth-century, is nearby.

Widdington was recorded in the Domesday Book of 1086 as Widituna. The entry reads: Widi(n)tuna: St Valery Abbey; Robert from Robert Gernon; Ranulf Peverel.

== See also ==
- The Hundred Parishes
