= Tom Tugendhat =

British politician (born 1973)

Lieutenant Colonel The Right Honourable Tom Tugendhat MBE VR MP
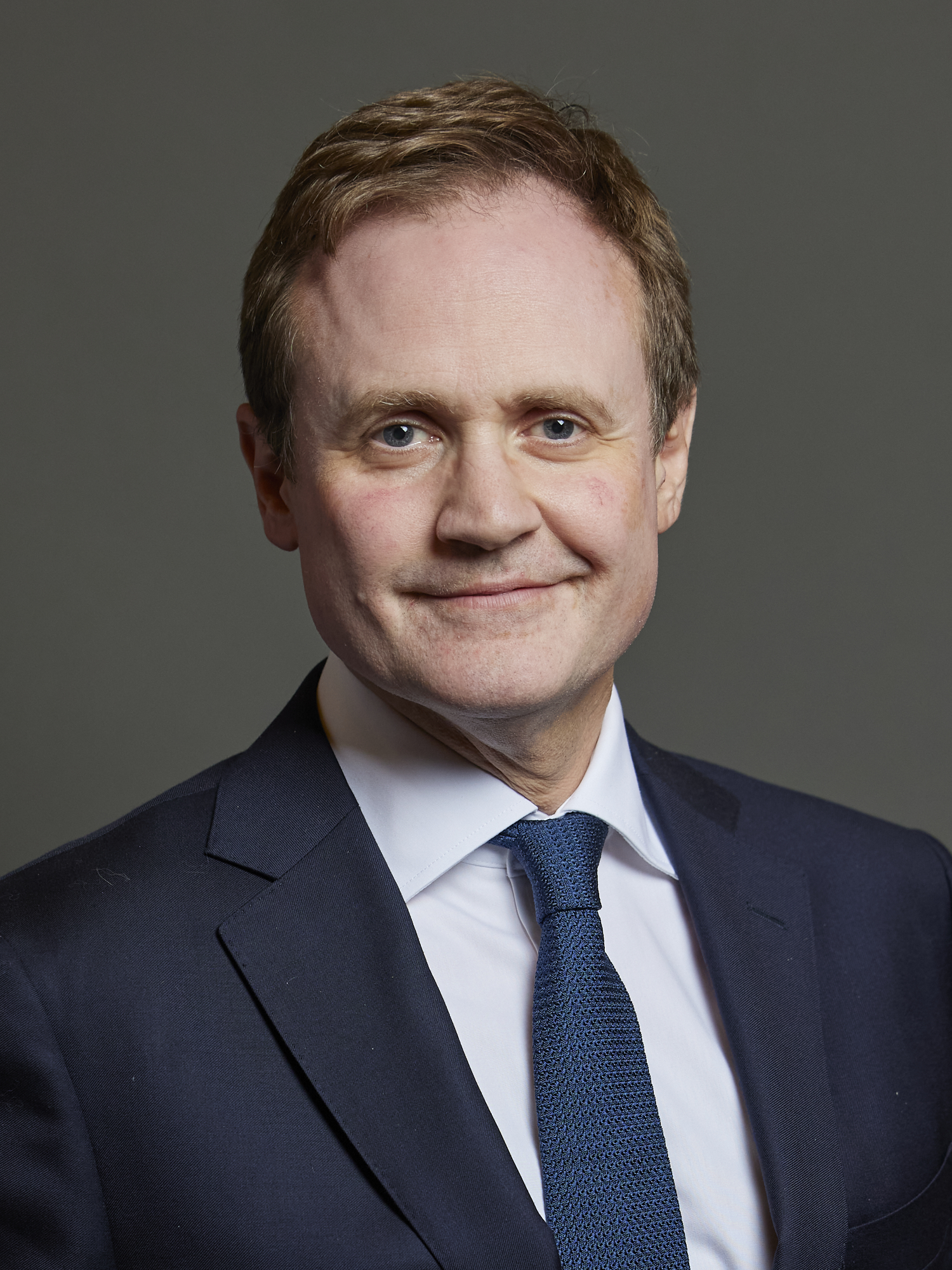
- Official portrait, 2024

Shadow Foreign Secretary
- Incumbent
- Assumed office 31 August 2026
- Leader: Kemi Badenoch
- Preceded by: Priti Patel

Minister of State for Security
- In office 6 September 2022 – 5 July 2024
- Prime Minister: Liz Truss; Rishi Sunak
- Preceded by: Stephen McPartland
- Succeeded by: Dan Jarvis
Further offices held
Shadow Minister for Security
In office 8 July 2024 – 2 November 2024
Leader	Rishi Sunak
Preceded by	Dan Jarvis
Succeeded by	Alicia Kearns
Chair of the Foreign Affairs Select Committee
In office 12 July 2017 – 6 September 2022
Preceded by	Crispin Blunt
Succeeded by	Alicia Kearns

Member of Parliament for Tonbridge Tonbridge and Malling (2015–2024)
- Incumbent
- Assumed office 7 May 2015
- Preceded by: John Stanley
- Majority: 11,166 (22.2%)

Personal details
- Born: Thomas Georg John Tugendhat; 27 June 1973 (age 53) London, England
- Citizenship: United Kingdom; France
- Party: Conservative
- Spouse: Anissia Morel
- Children: 2
- Parent: Michael Tugendhat (father)
- Relatives: Christopher Tugendhat (uncle)
- Education: University of Bristol (BA); Gonville and Caius College, Cambridge (MPhil)
- Website: tomtugendhat.org.uk

Military service
- Allegiance: United Kingdom
- Branch/service: Royal Naval Reserve; Army Reserve
- Years of service: 2003–present
- Rank: Lieutenant Commander (Royal Navy); Lieutenant Colonel (Army)
- Unit: Adjutant General's Corps; Intelligence Corps
- Battles/wars: Iraq War; War in Afghanistan
- Awards: MBE (2010); VR (2013)
- Tom Tugendhat's voice Tugendhat comments on the War in Afghanistan; Recorded 5 November 2021

Thomas Georg John Tugendhat (born 27 June 1973) is a British politician who has served as Shadow Foreign Secretary since 2026. He has been the Member of Parliament (MP) for Tonbridge, formerly Tonbridge and Malling, since 2015. A member of the Conservative Party, he previously served in the Cabinet as Security Minister from 2022 to 2024.

Born in Westminster, Tugendhat attended St Paul's School. He studied at the University of Bristol and went on to study at Gonville and Caius College, Cambridge. He then briefly worked in Beirut as a journalist for The Daily Star, before becoming an officer in the British Army reserves, the Territorial Army, in 2003; he served in both the Iraq War and the Afghanistan War. He later served as one of the military assistants to the Chief of the Defence staff. Tugendhat was elected to Parliament for the Conservative Party as the MP for Tonbridge and Malling in the 2015 general election. He was reelected in both the 2017 general election and the 2019 general election, and was also the Chair of the Foreign Affairs Select Committee between 2017 and 2022.

Following the resignation of Boris Johnson in July 2022, Tugendhat stood in the Conservative Party leadership election to succeed him. He was eliminated in the third round of parliamentary voting, and subsequently endorsed Liz Truss, serving in her government as Security Minister. Following Truss's resignation the next month, Tugendhat endorsed Rishi Sunak in the October 2022 Conservative Party leadership election and retained his ministerial position in Sunak's cabinet. After the Conservative Party's defeat in the 2024 general election, Tugendhat became Shadow Security Minister in Sunak's shadow cabinet; and after Sunak announced his intention to resign as Leader of the Conservative Party, Tugendhat launched another bid to become party leader. Again, he was eliminated in the third round of voting among Conservative MPs. He returned to the backbenches upon the election of Kemi Badenoch as leader. He was appointed Shadow Foreign Secretary in August 2026, replacing Priti Patel.

== Early life and education ==
Thomas Georg John Tugendhat was born on 27 June 1973 in Westminster, the son of Sir Michael Tugendhat, a High Court judge and his French-born wife Blandine de Loisne. He is a nephew of Lord Tugendhat, a Tory appointed Life Peer, businessman, former Vice President of the European Commission and Conservative Party politician.

He was educated at St Paul's School, London, an all-boys private school, before studying theology at the University of Bristol. Tugendhat then did a Master's degree course in Islamic studies at Gonville and Caius College, Cambridge, and learned Arabic in Yemen. Following university, he briefly worked as a journalist at the Lebanese newspaper The Daily Star.

== Military career ==
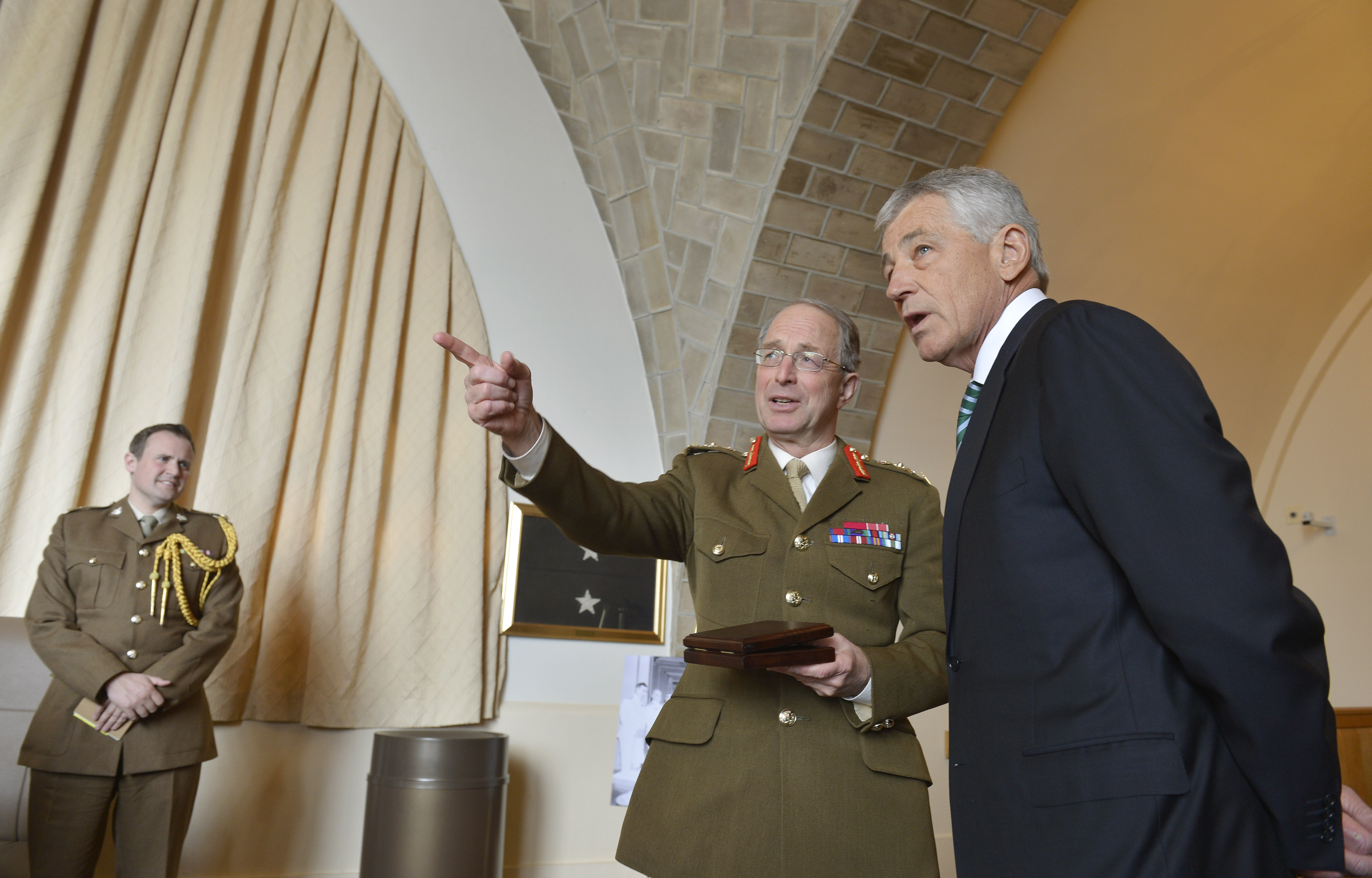
Thomas Tugendhat (left) in background as General Sir David Richards speaks to the US Secretary of Defense Chuck Hagel in 2013

On 6 July 2003, Tugendhat was commissioned into the Educational and Training Services Branch of the Adjutant General's Corps, Territorial Army, British Army, as a second lieutenant (on probation). His Territorial Army commission was confirmed on 16 July 2003. He transferred to the Intelligence Corps on 29 July 2003.

Tugendhat was promoted to lieutenant on 16 July 2005, captain on 1 April 2007, and to major on 1 January 2010. By July 2013, he was awarded the Volunteer Reserves Service Medal for long service in the Territorial Army.

Tugendhat served during the Iraq War and the War in Afghanistan. After the invasion of Iraq in 2003, he served a tour of duty in the country as an Arabic-speaking intelligence officer. He served in Afghanistan as a civilian, for the Foreign and Commonwealth Office (FCO), and helped set up the National Security Council of Afghanistan and the government in Helmand Province; for this, he received the Civilian Service Medal. From 2007 to 2009, he was on active service with the Army, including serving in Afghanistan, again alongside the Royal Marines. He later served as a military assistant to the Chief of the Defence Staff.

On 1 April 2022, he transferred from the Army Reserve to the Royal Naval Reserve, and was granted the rank of lieutenant commander.

== Parliamentary career (2015–present) ==
=== Backbenches (2015–2022) ===
In 2013, in an open primary, Tugendhat was selected as the Conservative candidate for Tonbridge and Malling, a safe Conservative seat in Kent. He was duly elected as its Member of Parliament at the 2015 general election, winning 59.4 per cent of the votes and a majority of 23,734.

In October 2015, Tugendhat accused Iran of arming insurgents in Iraq and Afghanistan. He said: "Through the Quds Force, the special forces unit of the regime's Islamic Revolutionary Guard Corps, it has killed British troops and plotted to assassinate diplomats in Washington DC. The ayatollahs have nurtured terrorists around the world."

Tugendhat voted against Brexit, supporting continued membership of the European Union in the 2016 Brexit referendum. He voted in favour of the withdrawal agreement negotiated by Theresa May's government on each of the three occasions it was put to a vote. At the snap 2017 United Kingdom general election, Tugendhat was re-elected, increasing his share of the vote to 63.6 per cent, but seeing his majority decrease to 23,508. On 12 July 2017, Tugendhat was elected to chair the Foreign Affairs Committee, becoming the youngest person to hold the post. After the poisoning of Sergei and Yulia Skripal in Salisbury by a nerve agent, Tugendhat said the attack was "if not an act of war ... certainly a warlike act by the Russian Federation".

In February 2018, Tugendhat praised Saudi Arabia's Crown Prince Mohammed bin Salman. He stated: "He is rightly showing a vision for Saudi Arabia that sees her taking her place as a player in the global economy and I think that is incredibly positive, not just for Saudi Arabia, but for the world." Under Tugendhat's chairmanship, the Foreign Affairs Committee focused on British foreign policy priorities after Brexit. Other significant enquiries have covered: the implications of China's growing role in the international system, India–United Kingdom relations, and the Responsibility to Protect.

On 21 May 2018, the Foreign Affairs Committee published a report on Russian corruption and the UK. This drew attention to the ability of President Vladimir Putin and his allies to launder assets through London, and called on the UK Government to "show stronger political leadership in ending the flow of dirty money into the UK". The report criticised the law firm Linklaters for its unwillingness to give evidence to the committee about the nature of working in the Russian Federation at that time.

At the 2019 general election, Tugendhat was again re-elected, seeing his share of the vote fall slightly to 62.8 per cent, but with an increased majority of 26,941. Tugendhat has "never made a secret of his ambitions to be Prime Minister one day." In January 2022, he stated he would consider standing for Prime Minister if Boris Johnson stepped down. The following month, he suggested expelling all Russian citizens from the UK in response to Russia's invasion of Ukraine, subsequently clarifying that he meant "all Russian citizens connected to the Putin regime. It's not a blanket expulsion". In July 2022, Tugendhat stood in the first Conservative Party leadership election of that year, following Prime Minister Boris Johnson's resignation, and was eliminated in the third round of parliamentary voting with 31 votes. His campaign raised £120,000.

=== Security Minister (2022–2024) ===
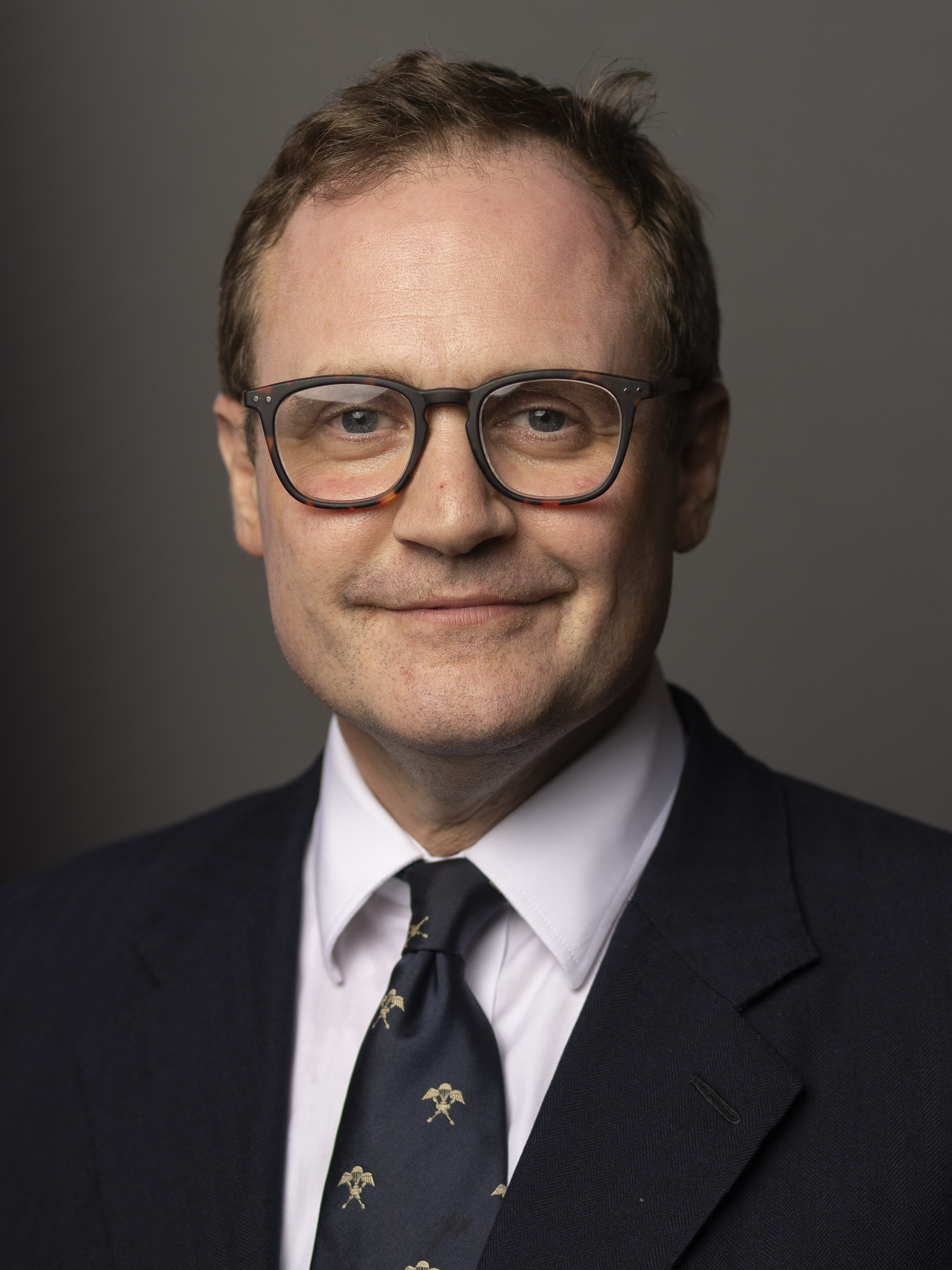
Official portrait, 2022

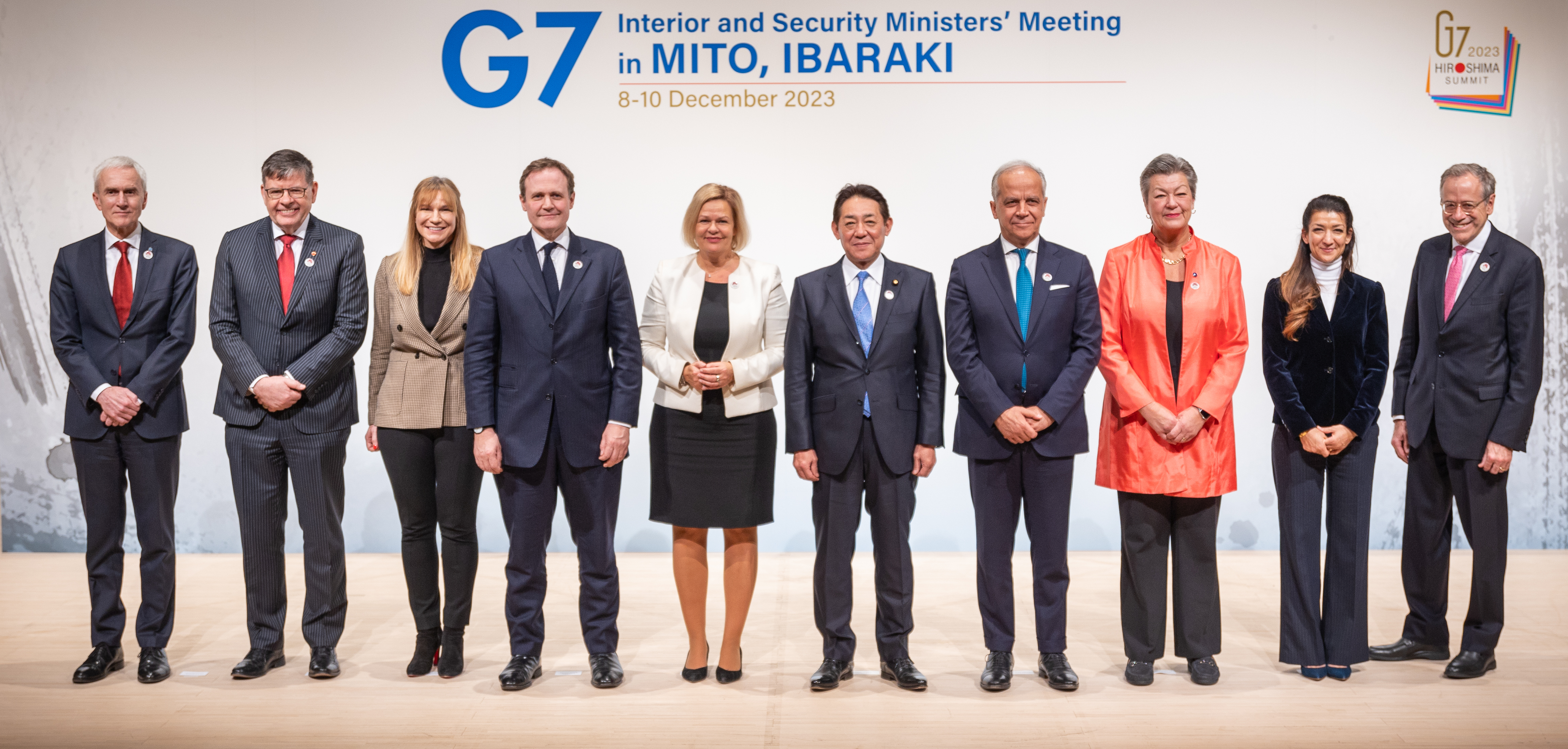
Tugendhat seen with counterparts at the G7 Interior and Security Minister's Meeting in Mito, Japan, December 2023.

On 6 September 2022, Tugendhat was appointed Minister of State for Security in the Home Office as part of Liz Truss's cabinet; he had supported Truss's candidacy over her rival Rishi Sunak. He was retained in this role by the Sunak government. In this role he continued taking a hawkish position on the People's Republic of China and, equally, the PRC has maintained travel bans against him. Tugendhat commissioned the National Cyber Security Centre to investigate ways that TikTok may compromise Britain's national security.

In June 2023, Tugendhat decided to join official talks with a government minister of Taiwan, breaking convention on the topic of mutual security interests. In the same month, his office announced that China had shut down its Chinese police overseas service stations in the UK, though their existence had been consistently denied by the Chinese embassy. With security within his portfolio, Tugendhat was left to decide on permitting protests during the Coronation of Charles III and Camilla, which he allowed.

=== In opposition (2024–present) ===
Following the Conservative Party's defeat in the 2024 United Kingdom general election and the subsequent formation of the Starmer ministry, Tugendhat was appointed Shadow Minister for Security in Rishi Sunak's caretaker Shadow Cabinet.

On 24 July 2024, he announced he was running in the leadership election to be the new Conservative Party leader. The following day Tugendhat's team were forced to change his campaign slogan after journalists and social media users discovered that the first letter of each line spelled out "TURD". In the first round, Tugendhat came fourth with 17 votes, but jumped up to joint third place with James Cleverly at 21 votes in the second round. However, in the third round, he fell back to fourth place with 20 votes and was eliminated.

Following Badenoch's election to lead the Conservative Party, Tugendhat was not named in her Shadow Cabinet and therefore returned to the backbenches.

In the 2026 shadow cabinet reshuffle, Tugendhat was appointed Shadow Foreign Secretary under Badenoch, replacing Priti Patel.

== Political positions ==
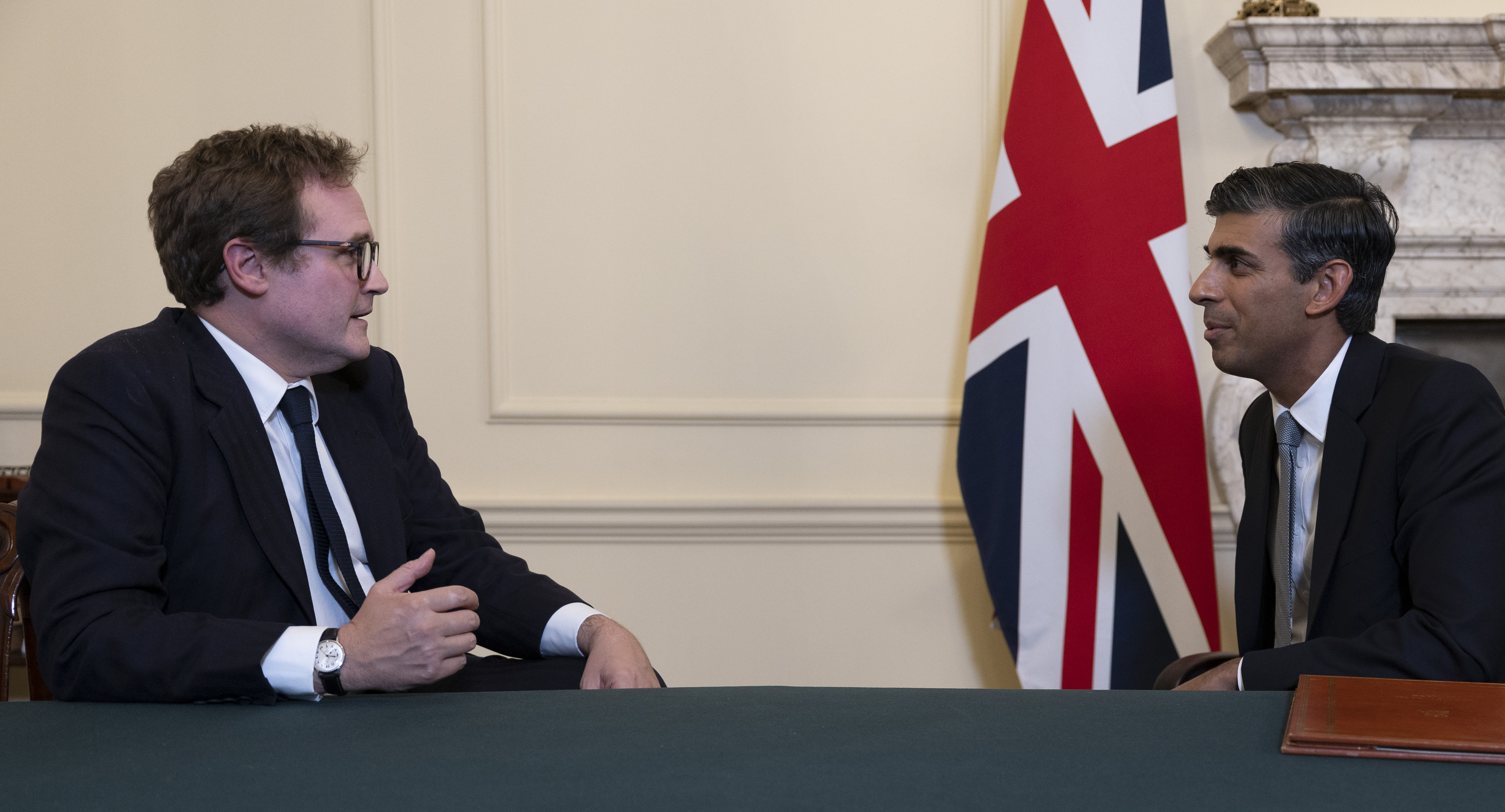
Tugendhat meeting with Prime Minister Rishi Sunak, October 2022.

=== European Court of Human Rights ===
During the July–September 2022 Conservative Party leadership election, Tugendhat said he did not support the UK leaving the European Court of Human Rights (ECHR). In October 2023, he warned that withdrawal would have negative consequences for the Good Friday Agreement, the Windsor Framework and devolved administrations in the UK.

During the 2024 Conservative Party leadership election, Tugendhat said he would leave the ECHR if it was seen as not "serv[ing] the interests of the British people".

In an interview with the Daily Telegraph, he said “Do I want to leave [the ECHR]? No. I want to reform it. I can't promise success and that is why I'm saying I am prepared to leave."

=== European Union ===
Tugendhat supported remaining in the EU at the referendum of June 2016; however, he has since described Brexit as a revolution which cannot be overturned, commenting in July 2022: "There is no way back into the European Union."

=== Conservatism ===
On 7 November 2018, Tugendhat gave a speech on "community conservatism" at an event organised by the Social Market Foundation. He described how his military experience had drawn him into politics and outlined several ways in which the government could encourage businesses to better serve the communities in which they operate.

=== Immigration ===
In September 2024 during the leadership election, Tugendhat pledged to implement a 100,000 annual net migration cap citing pressure on housing, infrastructure and public services.

=== Defence spending ===
In the July 2022 Conservative leadership election, Tugendhat pledged to increase defence spending to 3% of GDP.

In March 2024, Tugendhat called on his party leader and prime minister Rishi Sunak to increase defence spending to 2.5% of GDP.

In September 2024 during the Conservative leadership election, Tugendhat pledged to increase defence spending to 3% of GDP.

=== Education ===
Tugendhat called Labour's plans to add 20% VAT to private school fees from 1 January 2025 "one of the most vindictive policies to come out of a British government in generations".

=== Foreign policy ===
On 29 May 2018, Tugendhat set out his own views on British foreign policy in a speech at the Royal United Services Institute. He advocated giving the FCO greater powers to determine overall foreign policy strategy. In a recorded conversation with American politician Mike Gallagher, Tugendhat gave an off-the-cuff outline of his foreign policy outlook as "trying to defend the world in which the values that matter to the people of the United Kingdom, and more particularly, the people of Kent, prosper. And those values are freedom, democracy, the ability to challenge authority and the ability to trade and travel globally."

==== Afghanistan ====
In the wake of the Fall of Kabul in August 2021, Tugendhat described the event in The Times as Britain's "biggest foreign policy disaster since Suez". On 18 August, in the House of Commons, Tugendhat was applauded after giving a speech that drew on his own military experiences in Afghanistan. It concluded, "This doesn't need to be defeat, but right now it damn well feels like it."

==== China ====
In April 2020, Tugendhat founded the China Research Group alongside fellow Conservative MP Neil O'Brien. The group was formed to gain a "better understanding of China's economic ambitions and global role". This is to include Huawei's role in the UK's 5G network (see: Concerns over Chinese involvement in 5G wireless networks), China's COVID-19 disinformation campaign, and its foreign policy, in particular its relations with poorer regions of the world. Tugendhat is considered to be a China hawk in the House of Commons, alongside Sir Iain Duncan Smith.

In August 2020, Tugendhat received a letter at his home address, sent from Hong Kong and containing a prayer regarding his criticism of China's policies. On Twitter, Tugendhat said that this was sent by the Chinese authorities to threaten him, though this was not independently verified. On 26 March 2021, it was announced that Tugendhat was one of five MPs to be sanctioned by China for spreading what it called "lies and disinformation" about the country. He was subsequently banned from entering China, Hong Kong and Macau, and Chinese citizens and institutions are prohibited from doing business with him. The sanctions were condemned by the Prime Minister and led the Foreign Secretary to summon the Chinese ambassador. The sanctions were lifted on 30 January 2026 during a visit by Prime Minister Keir Starmer to China.

==== Israel ====
Tugendhat is a strong supporter of Israel. He condemned the United Nations Security Council for its official criticism of Israel's building settlements in the occupied Palestinian territories. In January 2017, he wrote that the Israeli–Palestinian conflict "doesn't matter" to the protestors of the Arab Spring, and concluded: "Why was it [Israel-Palestine] more pressing than other disputed territories such as Western Sahara, Kashmir or Tibet? It isn't. It simply deflects attention for those most in need of a diversion."

=== Bilderberg meetings ===
Tugendhat was a participant at the 30 May–2 June 2019 Bilderberg Meeting at Montreux, Switzerland, and the 2–5 June 2022 Bilderberg meeting in Washington, D.C.

== Personal life ==
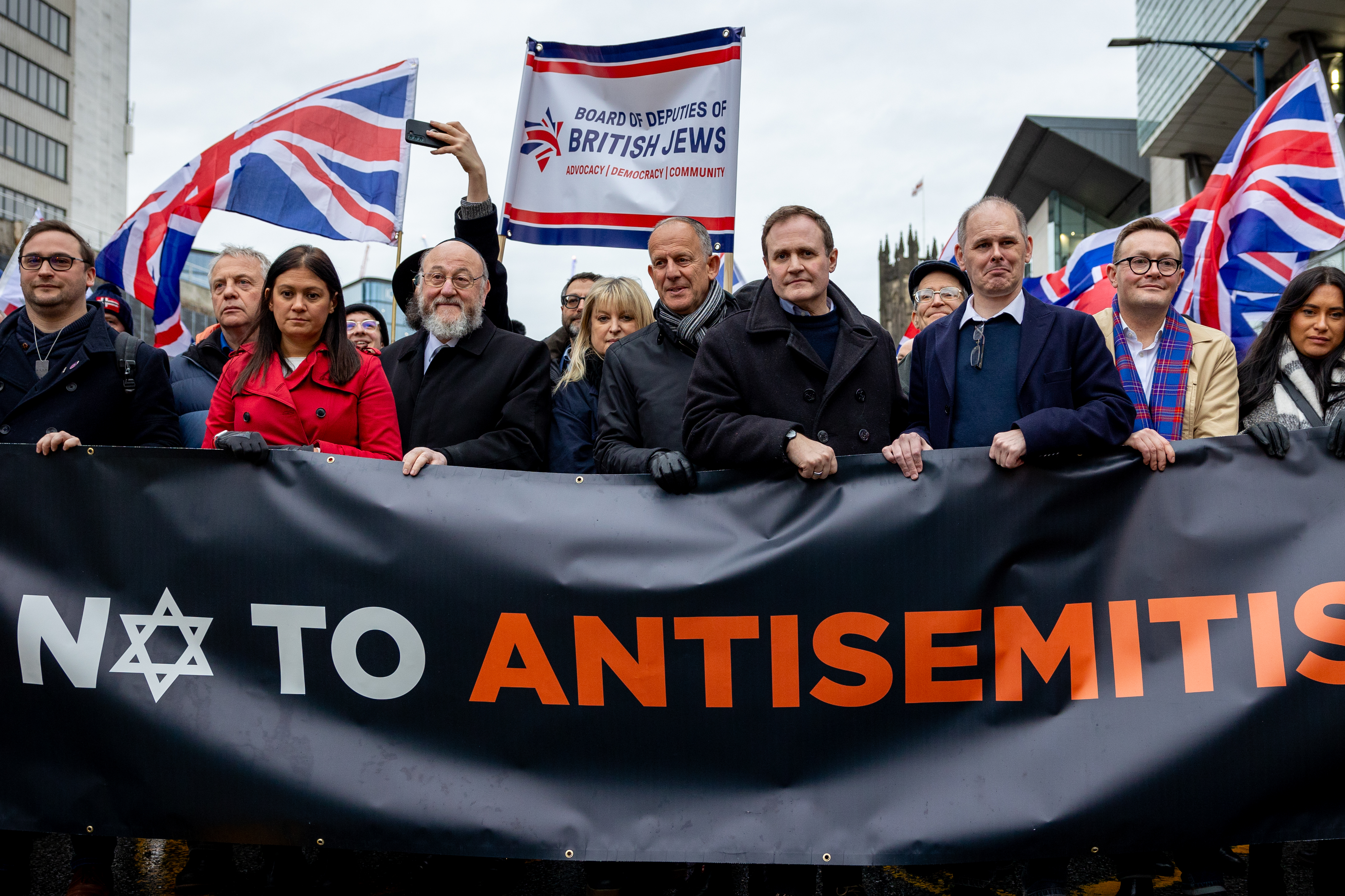
Leading a march against antisemitism in Manchester, 2024

Tugendhat's wife Anissia Morel is a lawyer and senior French civil servant. Anissia's father, Pierre Morel, served as the Ambassador of France to Russia, China and the Holy See between 1992 and 2005.

Tugendhat is a Catholic who identifies with Jewish people. His paternal grandfather was an Austrian Jewish émigré from Vienna, who converted to Catholicism. Following the December 2019 general election, Tugendhat criticised the antisemitism he had faced during the campaign. He stated: "It was a campaign that wasn't always as clean as previous ones. For the first time I faced antisemitism, which I found particularly offensive and very surprising for a community like this and frankly rather distasteful. It's very un-Tonbridge, it's very un-Kent and it's very un-British. ... I would hope that type of attitude is going to leave our politics for good."

On 17 November 2022 at Westminster Magistrates' Court, Tugendhat was banned from driving for six months after driving while holding his mobile phone, on 14 April 2022. He received six points on his licence for the offence, in addition to six he already had for two previous driving offences. He was also ordered to pay a £1,000 fine, a surcharge of £100 and costs of £110. In a written guilty plea, Tugendhat said he had been holding the phone, but not using it and had later taken a driving course.

== Honours ==
In the 2010 New Year Honours, Tugendhat was appointed a Member of the Order of the British Empire (MBE). In July 2013, he was awarded the Volunteer Reserves Service Medal (VR) for ten years' service in the Territorial Army. Tugendhat is an Honorary Professor in the Strategy and Security Institute at the University of Exeter. He is also an Honorary Fellow of St Augustine's College of Theology. He was sworn of His Majesty's Most Honourable Privy Council on 13 September 2022 at Buckingham Palace, giving him the honorific prefix "The Right Honourable" for life.

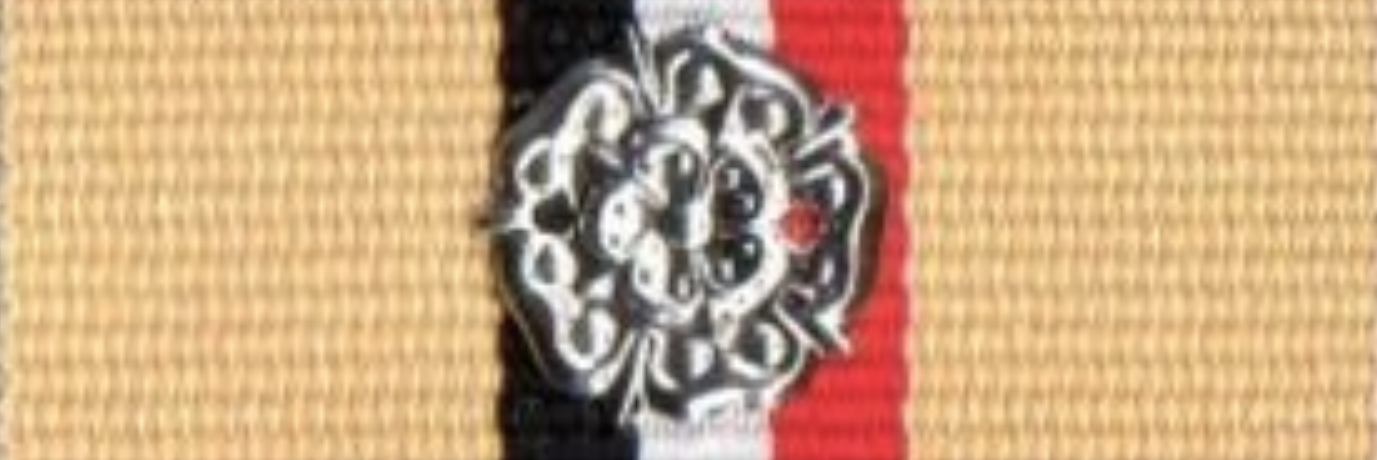

Country	Date	Appointment	Ribbon	Post-nominal letters	Notes
United Kingdom	31 December 2009	Member of the Most Excellent Order of the British Empire		MBE	Military Division
United Kingdom	6 February 2012	Queen Elizabeth II Diamond Jubilee Medal			
United Kingdom	23 July 2013	Volunteer Reserves Service Medal		VR	10 years service in the Territorial Army
United Kingdom		Iraq Medal			With "19 Mar to 28 Apr 2003" Clasp
United Kingdom		Civilian Service Medal (Afghanistan)			
United Kingdom		Operational Service Medal for Afghanistan			With clasp "AFGHANISTAN"
United States of America		Army Commendation Medal			

Parliament of the United Kingdom
Preceded by John Stanley	Member of Parliament for Tonbridge and Malling; 2015–present	Incumbent
Preceded by Stephen McPartland	Minister of State for Security; 2022–2024	Succeeded by Dan Jarvis
Preceded by Priti Patel	Shadow Foreign Secretary; 2026–present	Incumbent
