= Frank Penn =

Frank Penn may refer to:

- Frank Penn (cricketer, born 1851) (1851–1916), English cricketer
- Frank Penn (cricketer, born 1884) (1884–1961), English cricketer
- Frank Penn (footballer), English footballer, fl. 1910–1940
