= William Penn (cricketer) =

English cricketer

Personal information
- Born: 29 August 1849; Lee, Kent
- Died: 15 August 1921 (aged 71); Belgravia, London
- Batting: Right-handed
- Bowling: Right-arm fast
- Relatives: John Penn (father); John Penn (brother); Frank Penn (brother); Dick Penn (brother); Eric Penn (son)

Domestic team information
- Years: Team
- 1870–1878: Kent
- FC debut: 18 August 1870 Kent v Nottinghamshire
- Last FC: 22 July 1878 Kent v Derbyshire

Career statistics
Competition	First-class
Matches	22
Runs scored	402
Batting average	18.3
100s/50s	0/0
Top score	39
Catches/stumpings	12/–
- Source: CricInfo, 12 March 2014

William Penn (29 August 1849 – 15 August 1921) was an English amateur cricketer who played for Kent County Cricket Club in the 1870s.

Penn was born in Lee in Lewisham in south-east London, the son of John Penn, a manufacturer of marine engines at the John Penn and Sons works in Deptford and Greenwich. He was educated at Harrow School where he was in the cricket XI.

== Cricket ==
A right-handed batsman and bowler Penn played 18 times for Kent between 1870 and 1878 as well as appearing for Marylebone Cricket Club (MCC) in 1874 and Gentlemen of the South between 1871 and 1874. His younger brothers Frank and Dick Penn also played for Kent and his son Eric Penn played for Cambridge University and MCC.

== Business career ==
William Penn became a member of the Institution of Mechanical Engineers in 1873, proposed by his father and Joseph Whitworth. He became a partner in the family business around the same time, began to manage the firm in 1875, and in 1889, when the firm was incorporated as John Penn and Sons Ltd, he and his elder brother John were the two principal shareholders. When the company amalgamated with the Thames Ironworks and Shipbuilding Company ten years later, William Penn became a director of the new company, but resigned from the board by April 1901 on health grounds.

Penn died at Belgravia in London in August 1921 aged 71.

== Bibliography ==
- Carlaw, Derek (2020). Kent County Cricketers, A to Z: Part One (1806–1914) (PDF). Cardiff: ACS.
- Hartree, Richard (2008). John Penn and Sons of Greenwich, Richard Hartree. ISBN 9781843064114
