= Eric Penn =

English soldier and cricketer

Eric Frank Penn (17 April 1878 – 18 October 1915) was an English soldier and a cricketer who played first-class cricket for Cambridge University and the Marylebone Cricket Club (MCC) between 1898 and 1903. He was born at Westminster, London and died in the fighting of the First World War near Loos, France.

Eric Penn was the eldest son of William Penn, a cricketer and a businessman who ran the family engineering company of John Penn and Sons founded by his own father, John Penn, which was based in Greenwich, London. Eric Penn was educated at Eton College and at Trinity College, Cambridge.

Penn played cricket as a right-handed middle-order batsman and a right-arm slow bowler while at school. At Cambridge, he played in a few first-team games in 1898 but did not consolidate his place in the side and was not picked for the University Match against Oxford University. In 1899, he played regularly as a lower-order batsman and bowler and in the match against the MCC he took five second-innings wickets for 47 runs, the best bowling performance of his first-class cricket career. He was awarded a Blue, though he took only one wicket in the 1899 University Match.

There was then a hiatus in Penn's university and cricket career, as he joined the 3rd (Militia) battalion of the Royal Scots as a lieutenant on 30 August 1899. The battalion was embodied in December 1899 to serve in the Second Boer War, and in early March 1900 left Queenstown on the SS Oriental for South Africa. He returned to both Cambridge and cricket for the 1902 season, when he had less success as a bowler but more as a batsman, scoring 51 not out in the match against Ireland, his only half-century. He won a second Blue but again made little impact in the University Match.

Penn appears to have left Cambridge University without taking a degree. He played in only one further first-class cricket match – a single game for MCC against Cambridge University in 1903. From 1899 to 1906 he played Minor Counties cricket for Norfolk, where his father had bought Taverham Hall near Norwich.

On the outbreak of the First World War, Penn joined the Norfolk Yeomanry; he transferred to the 4th Battalion of the Grenadier Guards in April 1915 and was promoted to the rank of captain in September that year, a month before he was killed in the fighting of the Battle of Loos.

In 1906, Penn married Gladys Eveleen Ebden, daughter of Charles Ebden of Baldslow Place near Hastings in East Sussex.
