= Dick Penn =

English cricketer

Personal information
- Full name: Alfred Penn
- Born: 6 January 1855; Lee, Kent
- Died: 18 October 1889 (aged 34); Lee, Kent
- Batting: Left-handed
- Bowling: Slow left-arm orthodox
- Relatives: John Penn (father); John Penn (brother); Frank Penn (brother); William Penn (brother)

Domestic team information
- Years: Team
- 1875–1884: Kent
- FC debut: 12 July 1875 Kent v Sussex
- Last FC: 12 May 1884 Kent v Marylebone Cricket Club (MCC)

Career statistics
Competition	First-class
Matches	48
Runs scored	539
Batting average	7.81
100s/50s	0/1
Top score	66
Balls bowled	9,630
Wickets	222
Bowling average	16.07
5 wickets in innings	20
10 wickets in match	3
Best bowling	8/34
Catches/stumpings	21/–
- Source: CricInfo, 28 February 2011

Alfred Penn (6 January 1855 – 18 October 1889), known as Dick Penn, was an English amateur cricketer who played for Kent County Cricket Club from 1875 to 1884.

Penn was born at The Cedars in Lee in what is now south-east London but was historically part of Kent. He was the son of John Penn, a manufacturer of marine engines with works in Deptford and Greenwich. His brothers Frank and William were both cricketers whilst another brother, John, was the Member of Parliament for Lewisham from 1891 to 1903.

Penn made his first-class cricket debut for Kent in July 1875, playing against Sussex at Hove. He went on to play a total of 48 first-class matches, 41 of which were for Kent.

Penn died at Lee in October 1889 at the age of 34.

== Bibliography ==
- Carlaw, Derek (2020). Kent County Cricketers, A to Z: Part One (1806–1914) (PDF). Cardiff: ACS.
