= Frank Penn (cricketer, born 1851) =

English cricketer

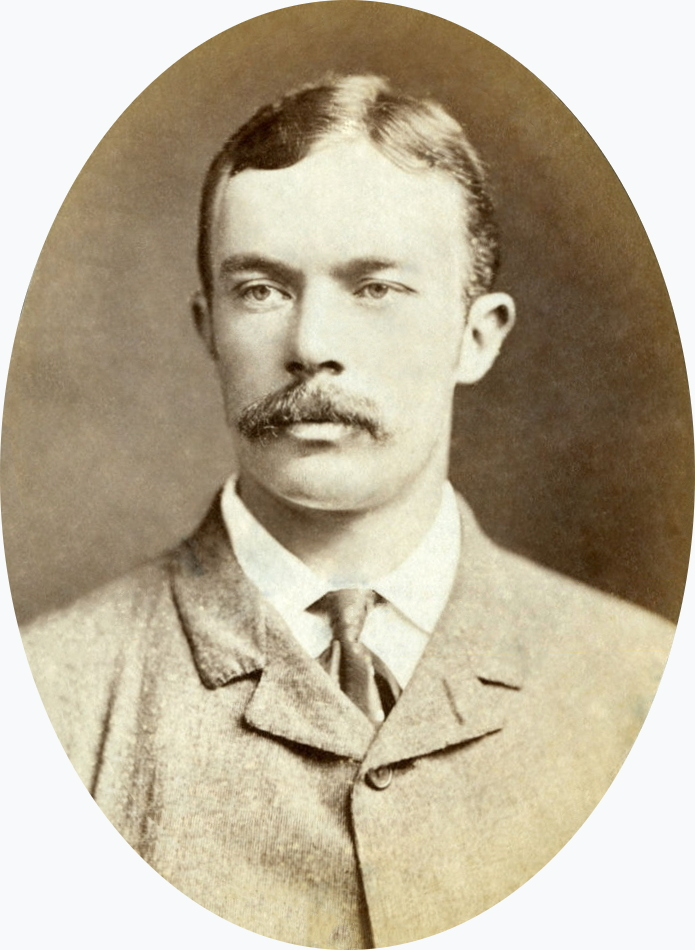
- Penn in around 1878

Personal information
- Born: 7 March 1851; Lee, Kent
- Died: 26 December 1916 (aged 65); Bifrons, Patrixbourne, Kent
- Batting: Right-handed
- Bowling: Right-arm slow
- Relatives: John Penn (father); John Penn (brother); William Penn (brother); Dick Penn (brother); Frank Penn Jr (son)

International information
- National side: England
- Only Test (cap 27): 6 September 1880 v Australia

Domestic team information
- Years: Team
- 1875–1881: Kent

Career statistics
Competition	Test	First-class
Matches	1	98
Runs scored	50	4,291
Batting average	50.00	27.15
100s/50s	0/0	6/17
Top score	27*	160
Balls bowled	12	897
Wickets	0	10
Bowling average	–	37.10
5 wickets in innings	–	0
10 wickets in match	–	0
Best bowling	–	3/36
Catches/stumpings	0/–	49/–
- Source: CricInfo, 11 November 2018

Frank Penn (7 March 1851 – 26 December 1916) was an amateur English international cricketer who played for Kent County Cricket Club from 1875 to 1881 and was considered one of the finest batsmen of his day. He played once for England in the first Test match played in England in 1880.

Penn was born at Lee in Lewisham, then part of Kent in 1851, the son of John Penn. His father was an engineer and ran John Penn and Sons, a company manufacturing marine steam engines in Deptford and Greenwich. He made his first-class cricket debut for Kent in 1875, having played club cricket previously.

His Wisden obituary describes Penn as "the famous Kent batsman" who had "a short but very brilliant career, ranking for several years among the finest batsmen of his day." It described his batting as combining "strong defence with splendid hitting" and said he had "a free, commanding style". In 1877, he made 857 runs in 24 innings, including two centuries, and took part in the England tour of Australia in 1878/79, although he did not play in the only Test match.

Penn did, however, play in the first Test in England in 1880, hitting the winning runs. His cricket career ended in 1881 when his doctor advised him not to run due to heart disease. He had played in 98 first-class matches, 62 of them for Kent.

After his playing career, Penn remained a prominent figure at Kent, helping Lord Harris build the club. He was the club's president in 1905.

Penn died at Patrixbourne near Canterbury in 1916 aged 65 with an estate valued at £981.

== Family ==
His brothers William and Dick also played for Kent, as did his son Frank junior. Another brother, John was the Member of Parliament for Lewisham from 1891 to 1903. He was married to Grace.

== Bibliography ==
- Carlaw, Derek (2020). Kent County Cricketers, A to Z: Part One (1806–1914) (PDF). Cardiff: ACS.
