= Novotext =

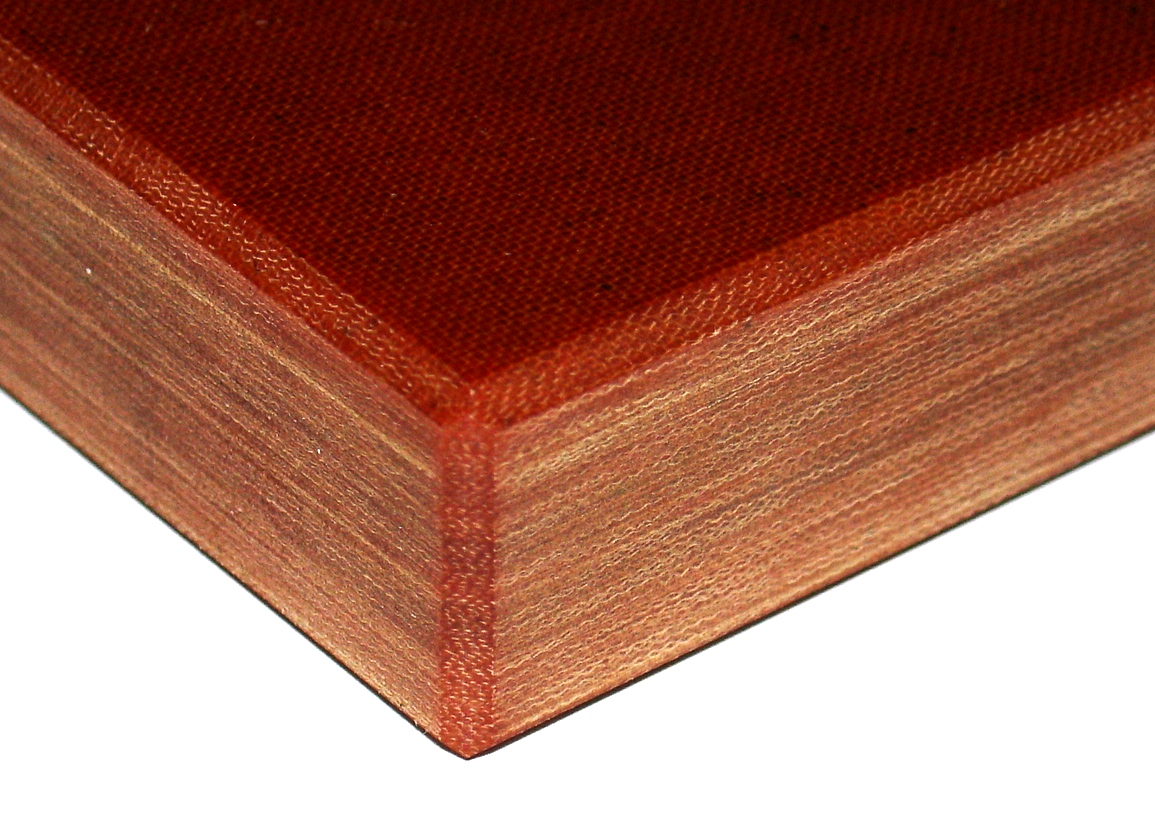
A block of Textolit

Novotext is a trade name for cotton textile-phenolic resin, essentially cotton-reinforced Bakelite. It was often used in car engines for gear wheels used to provide a direct drive to the camshaft as it is flexible and quiet-running. One of the first luxury cars to use this material for its camshaft drive gears was the Maybach Zeppelin of 1928. The material is known under various other names such as Turbax, Resitex, Celeron and Textolit. In bar form it is also known as Cartatextiel and Ferrozell and in sheet form as Harex, Tufnol and Micarta.

== Tufnol ==
Tufnol is a composite material comprising phenolic resin and another material (paper, cotton fabric etc.). The two materials together complement each other's qualities. It is inherently water resistant and some grades are used as a lining in loaded bearings (e.g. stave bearings) where lubricating oil use is not feasible. Rather, it can be lubricated with water. It has very low friction characteristics; thus it finds its use in dusty, chemically sensitive environments. The ability to work without oil makes it a preferable choice for design engineers. Unfortunately, the preparation is not as environmentally friendly.

== Production ==
Production is achieved through the use of chopped strand mat (CSM) technique.
