= John Penn (engineer) =

English marine engineer (1805–1878)

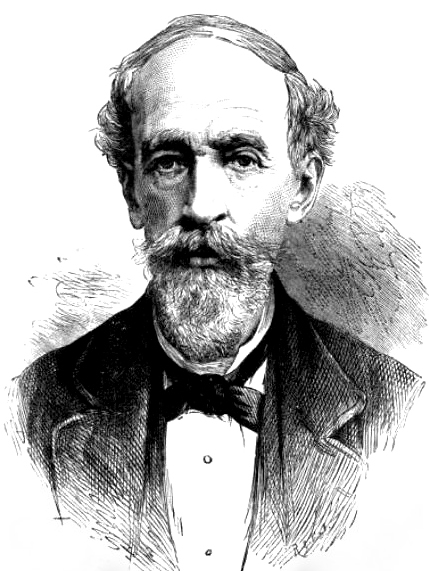
- John Penn
- Born: 1805; Greenwich
- Died: 1878 (aged 72–73); Lee, Kent
- Spouse: Ellen English (m. 1847)
- Engineering career
- Institutions: Royal Society; Institution of Mechanical Engineers
- Significant advance: High-power oscillating engine Trunk engine Lignum vitae stern bearing (with Francis Pettit Smith)

John Penn FRS (1805–1878) was an English marine engineer whose firm was pre-eminent in the middle of the 19th century due to his innovations in engine and propeller systems, which led his firm to be the major supplier to the Royal Navy as it made the transition from sail to steam power. He was also president of the Institution of Mechanical Engineers on two occasions.

== Early life ==
John Penn was born in 1805 in Greenwich, the son of engineer and millwright John Penn (born in Taunton, Somerset, 1770; died 6 June 1843). The senior John Penn had in 1799 started an agricultural engineering business on the site at the junction of Blackheath and Lewisham Roads (close to modern-day Deptford Bridge). It grew in two decades to be one of the major engineering works in the London area. The focus of the firm was mainly in agriculture and more specifically mills for corn and flour. Although John Penn senior lived in Lewisham he stood as a reformist candidate for Greenwich in the December 1832 parliamentary election.

== Career ==
Penn entered his father's works at an early age and became a partner in the early 1830s whereupon the firm became John Penn and Sons. When his father died in 1843 the sole possession of the works passed to Penn, although for some years previously he had had sole management of the works. Penn was an inventor of engines and one of the earliest engines he produced was the grasshopper beam engine, a six horsepower version being the first steam engine to power the machinery at the works.

Penn shifted the focus of the works to marine engines. His 40-horsepower beam engines were fitted in the paddle steamers 'Ipswich' and 'Suffolk', and it is likely these were the first marine engines to be designed and built by Penn. He then focussed on improving the oscillating engine from the version patented by Aaron Manby in 1821. In 1844 he replaced the engines of the Admiralty yacht, HMS Black Eagle with oscillating engines of double the power, without increasing either the weight or space occupied, an achievement which broke the naval supply dominance of Boulton & Watt and Maudslay, Son & Field. His enhanced reputation due to this notable advancement was further augmented by Penn's introduction of trunk engines for driving screw propellers in vessels of war. HMS Encounter (1846) and HMS Arrogant (1848) were the first ships to be fitted with such engines and such was their efficacy that by the time of Penn's death in 1878, the engines had been fitted in 230 ships. Initially, ships were adapted to incorporate these engines, but in 1851, the Navy ordered its first ship specifically designed as a steam-screw auxiliary, HMS Agamemnon. In 1852 the new owners of SS Great Britain decided to recognise the rapid advances in propeller engine technology, and replace the original engines with a pair of smaller, lighter and more modern oscillating engines, designed and built by John Penn and Son.

These advancements were coupled with a reputation for quality and reliability and this led to Penn becoming the major engine supplier to the Royal Navy as it made the transition from sail to steam. Penn was also responsible for introducing wood bearings for screw-propeller shafts which became vital to the worldwide use of steam-powered ships. (Note: Penn presented two papers on the subject to the Institution of Mechanical Engineers in 1856 and 1858.) This development of the lignum vitae stern bearing which enabled screw propeller ships to make oceanic voyages without wearing out their stern glands came in collaboration with Francis Pettit Smith. Other notable associations include his work on the application of superheated steam in marine engines.

Penn also produced the trunk engine for HMS Warrior and during construction was requested to develop an engine design for the RN gunboats being readied for the Crimean War. Penn chose his trunk engine design and subsequently produced 90 sets of what were the first mass-produced, high-pressure and high-revolution marine engines. At the Admiralty's insistence, they also used the Whitworth measurement standards throughout; Penn was a great friend of Joseph Whitworth, and employed the precision instruments and tools developed by him. The association with Whitworth was important in the development of mass-produced marine engines, as is clear from the obituary to Whitworth from The Times of 24 January 1887:

The Crimean War began, and Sir Charles Napier demanded of the Admiralty 120 gunboats, each with engines of 60 horsepower, for the campaign of 1855 in the Baltic. There were just ninety days in which to meet this requisition, and, short as the time was, the building of the gunboats presented no difficulty. It was otherwise however with the engines, and the Admiralty were in despair. Suddenly, by a flash of the mechanical genius which was inherent in him, the late Mr John Penn solved the difficulty, and solved it quite easily.

He had a pair of engines on hand of the exact size. He took them to pieces and he distributed the parts among the best machine shops in the country, telling each to make ninety sets exactly in all respects to the sample. The orders were executed with unfailing regularity, and he actually completed ninety sets of engines of 60 horsepower in ninety days – a feat which made the great Continental Powers stare with wonder, and which was possible only because the Whitworth standards of measurement and of accuracy and finish were by that time thoroughly recognised and established throughout the country. (Note: Hartree 2008, p. 43, though, describes the obituary as "a more graphic, factually inaccurate and almost mythical version of John Penn's contribution to gunboat engine manufacture")

The engine recovered from the wreck of the SS Xantho is of the gunboat type. Built (or assembled) in 1861, it is the only known example, and in being recovered intact was found to have all its fittings and fixtures attached including Penn's nameplate. It is on display at the Western Australian Museum.

John Penn's firm was a major employer in the Greenwich area with 1800 employed at its Greenwich and Deptford works at its peak. John Penn and Sons was considered the best-equipped marine engineering works and Penn a model employer. He recognised the value of skilled employees through pensions and awarded Christmas gifts. His works also provided the education for a whole generation of marine engineers.

== Later life ==
John Penn became a Member of the Institution of Mechanical Engineers in 1848 and served as its president on two occasions (in 1858–1859, and again in 1867–1868). In June 1859 he was elected a Fellow of the Royal Society; the citation said:

John Penn CE (Civil Engineer). The Inventor of Several Parts of Marine Steam Engines and Machinery Connected with Steam Navigation. Distinguished for his acquaintanceship with the science of mechanics. Eminent as a Mechanician and Engineer. From personal knowledge John Penn CE (Civil Engineer). Signed W Cubitt; Thos. Sopwith, Joseph Whitworth; Rob Stephenson and others.

— Hartree 2008

In 1860 Penn was a founder member of the Royal Institution of Naval Architects.

In 1872 Penn's two elder sons entered into the firm's partnership, and Penn became less active in the business, eventually retiring completely in 1875. Towards the end of his life Penn became paralysed in his lower limbs, and later he became blind. During his retirement, he visited France, Belgium, Holland and Italy by steam yacht. He died at his home, The Cedars, Lee, London, on 23 September 1878, survived by his wife, and was buried nearby at St Margaret's Church, Lee, on 29 September. The Kentish Mercury and Greenwich Gazette wrote of him as 'Greenwich's greatest son'. By the time of his death the firm had built engines for 735 ships, ranging from river ferries to battleships.

Aside from the advances made in marine engineering, John Penn is remembered in Greenwich through street names and buildings. John Penn Street in Greenwich, which once ran down one side of the works site, remains, as do the Penn Almshouses in South Street, built in 1884 in memory of the second John Penn. He is also represented in Deptford, such as the arched riverfront of the boiler works, and in Lee, south of Blackheath, John Penn's grand house The Cedars still stands, although now converted into flats.

== Personal life and family ==
In 1847 Penn married Ellen English, the daughter of another London engineer, William English of Enfield. She was 21 years his junior. They had four sons John, William, Frank and Alfred (Dick). In 1872, he handed over management of the works to his two eldest sons, retiring altogether in 1875. His eldest son John became MP for Lewisham in 1891 and served until his death in 1903 and his sons Frank, William and Dick all played cricket for Kent. They had two daughters of whom Isabella married Frederick Stokes and Ellen married Joseph Fletcher Green, both England national rugby union team players whom they married in 1877.

Penn's sister Charlotte married William Hartree in 1839; Hartree was probably already an apprentice with the firm of which he became a partner in 1848. Hartree's sister Maria married John Matthew who became an apprentice with the firm in 1840 and during that decade chief designer and the third partner of the firm. William Hartree was the great grandfather of mathematician and physicist Douglas Hartree; John Matthew's daughter married Sir Trevor Lawrence.

Professional and academic associations
Preceded by Joseph Whitworth	President of the Institution of Mechanical Engineers; 1858–1859	Succeeded by James Kennedy
Preceded by Joseph Whitworth	President of the Institution of Mechanical Engineers; 1866–1868	Succeeded by William George Armstrong
