= Maybach Zeppelin =

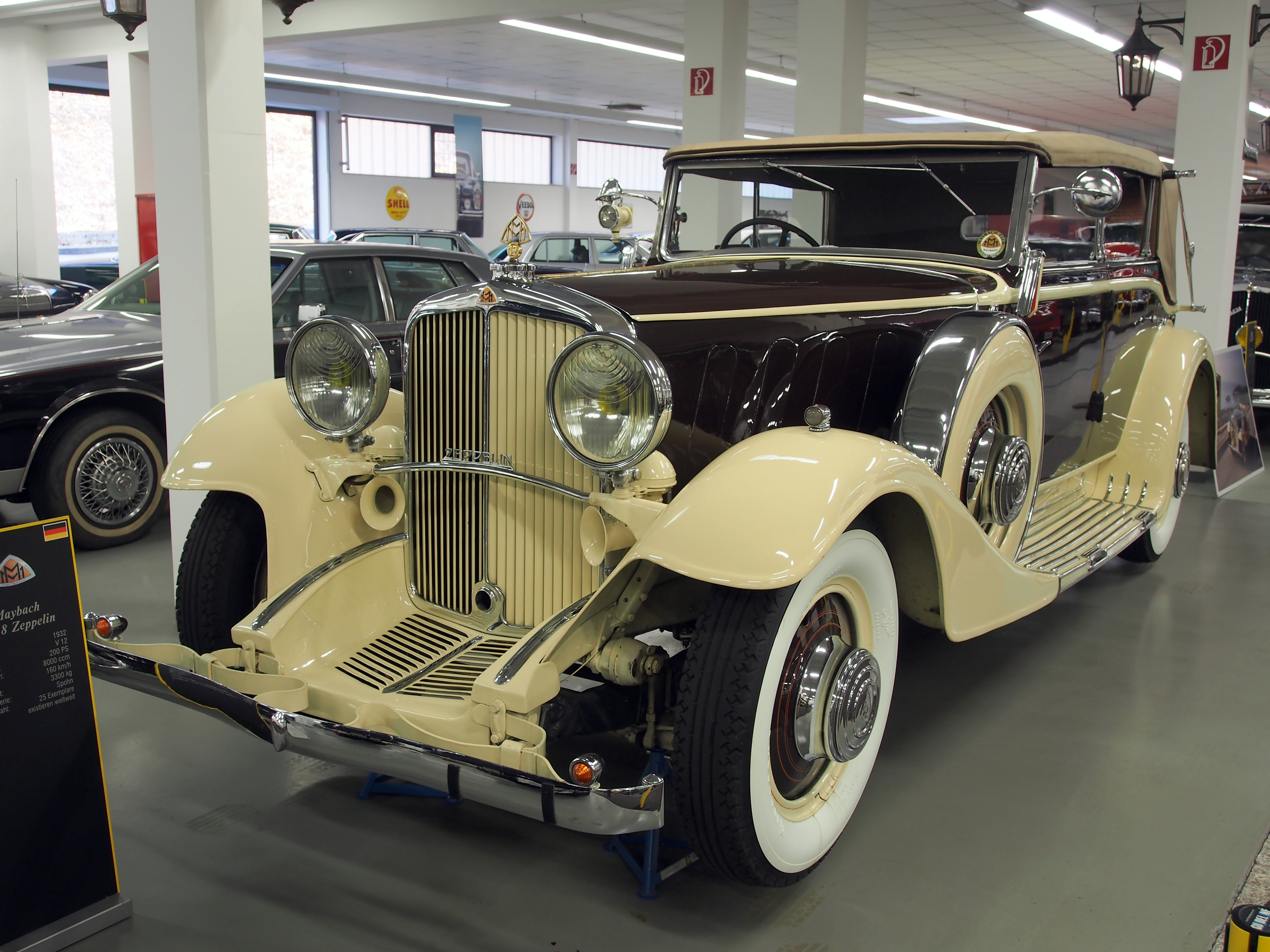

Overview
- Manufacturer: Maybach
- Production: 1928–1938
- Assembly: Stuttgart, Nazi Germany

Body and chassis
- Class: Full-size luxury car (F)
- Body style: 4-door cabriolet 2-door cabriolet 4-door saloon
- Layout: FR layout

Powertrain
- Engine: 6,971 cc (7.0L) V12 150 hp (110 kW); 7,978 cc (8.0L) V12 200 hp (150 kW)
- Transmission: 4-speed manual w/overdrive 8-speed Variorex semi-automatic

Dimensions
- Wheelbase: 147 in (3,734 mm)

The Maybach Zeppelin was the Maybach company's Repräsentationswagen (Note: Repräsentationswagen, "a vehicle that will make the biggest possible impact at the embassy, the opera or the country club.") model from 1928 to 1938. Named for the company's famous production of Zeppelin engines prior to and during World War I, it was an enormous luxury vehicle which weighed approximately 3,000 kg (6,600 lb). This weight was so great that German drivers required an additional goods vehicle licence (needed for vehicles over 2½ tons). Along with the Avions Voisin C18, and behind the Daimler Double Six, this was Europe's joint second luxury V12 car in production.

== DS7 ==
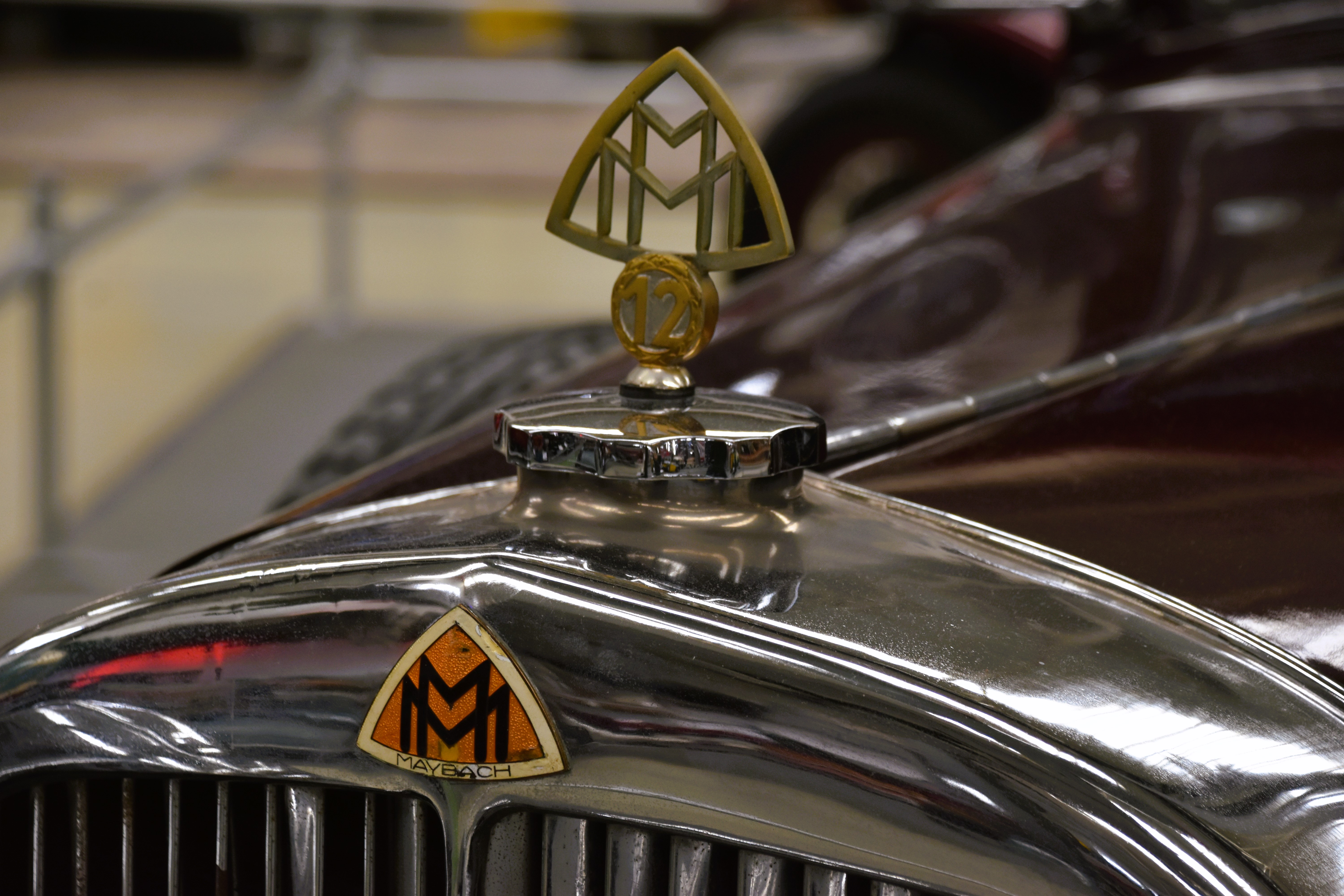
Maybach Zeppelin DS7 hood ornament

The DS7 (Doppel Sechs 7) version featured a 7.0 L (6,971 cc) V12 engine that produced 110 kW (150 hp) at 2,800 rpm. It was available from 1929 to 1930. Work began in 1928 on a model simply called the "Maybach 12" which went on sale in 1929. In 1930 it was re-branded as the DS7 and the "Zeppelin" badge appeared on a bar between the headlamps; although adopted universally as the "Maybach Zeppelin", this was never the car's official model.

Karl Maybach's engine was a long-stroke design, with dimensions of 86×100 mm. The crankshaft had eight main bearings, one being a smaller outrigger at the rear, supporting the camshaft drive gears. In a novel feature for reduced noise, these were made of Novotext, a resin-impregnated fibre composite. A further novel feature was the use of enlarged four-bolt main bearing caps on three of the bearings.

== DS8 ==
Supplementing the DS7 from 1930 was the DS8 (Doppelganger). It sported an 8.0 L (7978 cc, 487 cubic inches) V12 which made 149 kW; 203 PS (200 bhp) at a fairly low 3200 rpm, putting the DS8 among the most powerful production cars in the world at the time. Depending on the weight of the coachwork, a top speed of 171 km/h (106 mph) was possible.

A notable technical innovation was the Variorex transmission. A development of previous Maybach pre-selector transmissions, it featured a vacuum shift operation similar to the Cord 812, with a clutch pedal used only for stops and starts. A conventional floor-mounted gear lever was used to engage the transmission or select reverse, and a stalk mounted to the steering column selected one of eight gears arranged sequentially. While moving, any desired gear could be pre-selected using the stalk, the operator would release the accelerator and slightly tap the clutch, and the transmission would change to the desired gear swiftly and smoothly. It featured eight forward gears (possibly the first automotive transmission to do so) in constant mesh and reverse, with eighth being an overdrive. This initial iteration of the Variorex was first fitted to the DS8, and later developments would end up in the drivetrains of various German tanks and half-tracks. In August 2012, a 1938 DS8 Roadster equipped with a Variorex sold for €1.3 million at auction, and is thought to be one of only 100 built.

== Revival ==
When Maybach was revived as a brand by DaimlerChrysler, pre-war Maybach models, particularly the opulent 8-litre Zeppelin, saw new popularity as part of a marketing effort which sought to link the current brand with the heritage of the original car company. This resurrecting of the classic name resulted in increased visibility and popularity of well-restored or preserved Maybachs.

== Gallery ==
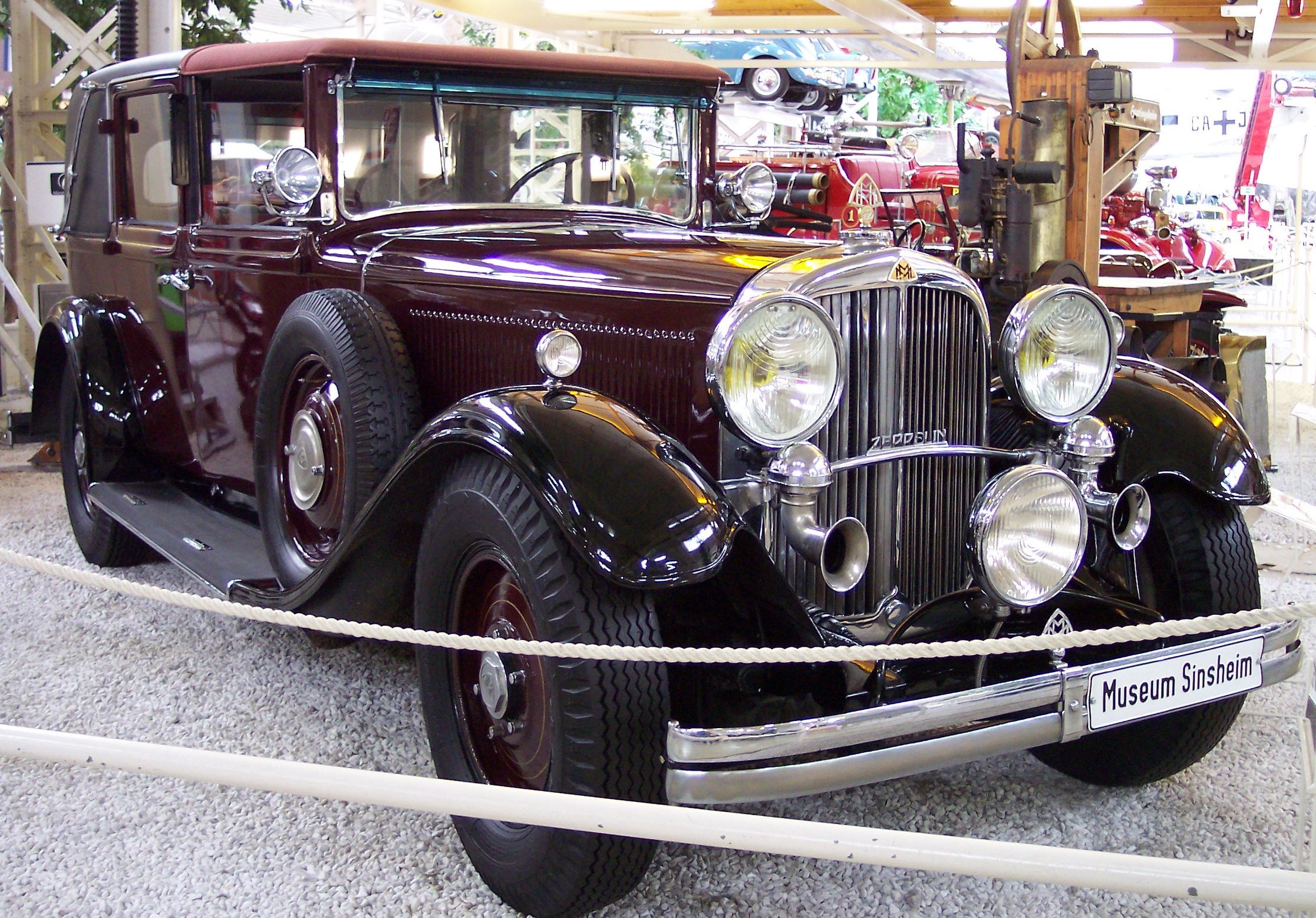
1930 Maybach Zeppelin DS7

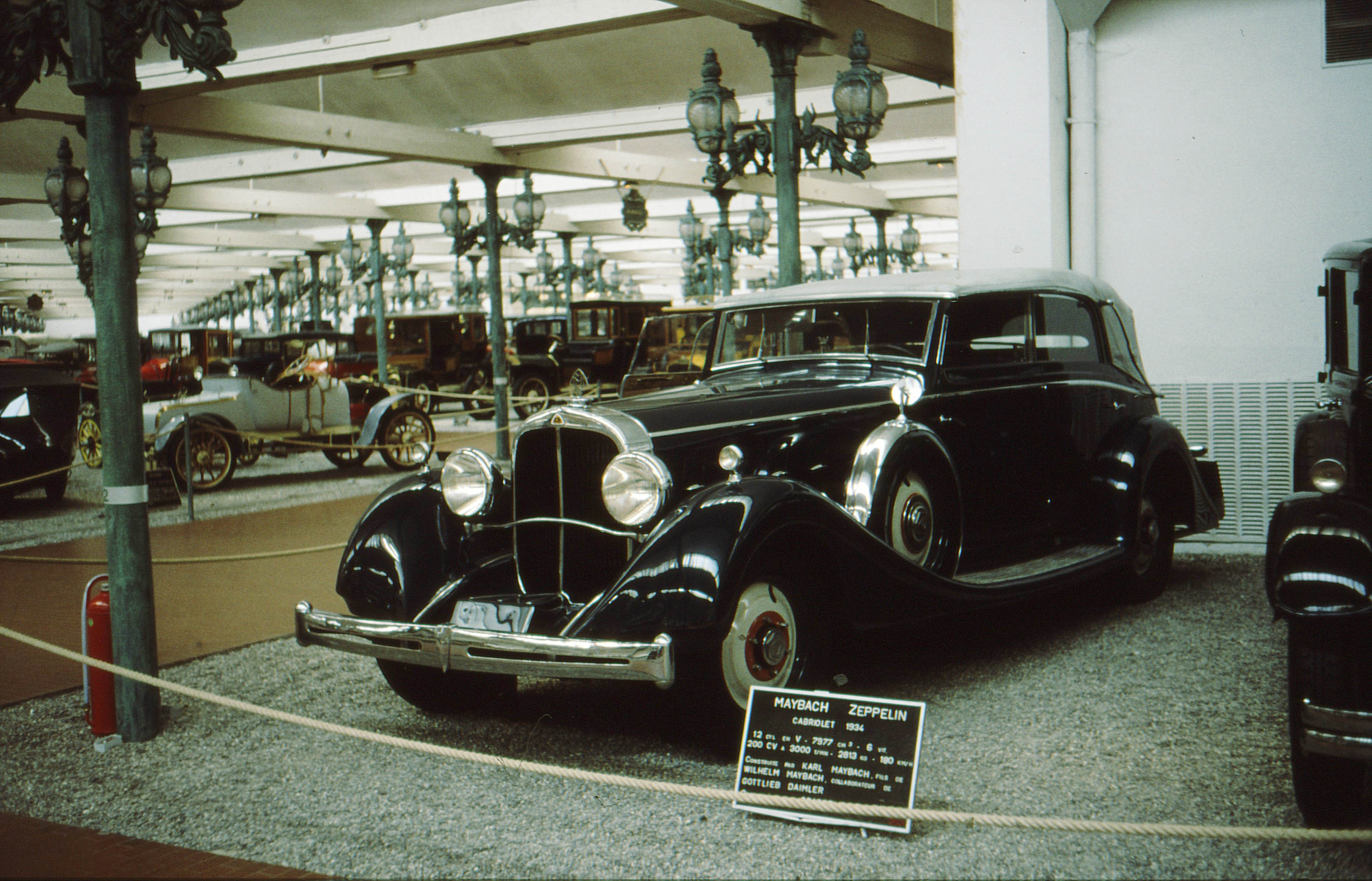
1934 Maybach Zeppelin DS8 Cabriolet

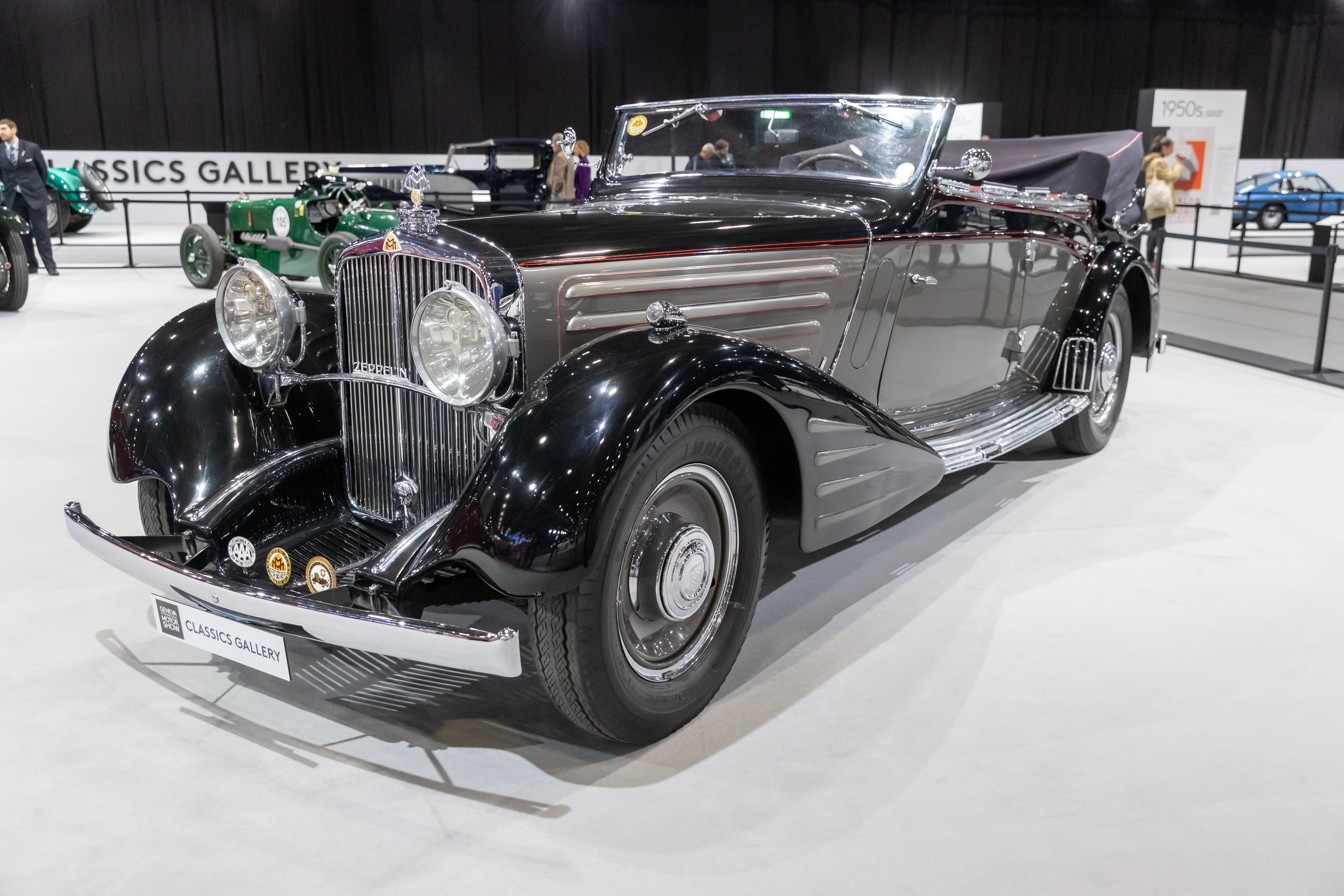
Maybach Zeppelin DS8

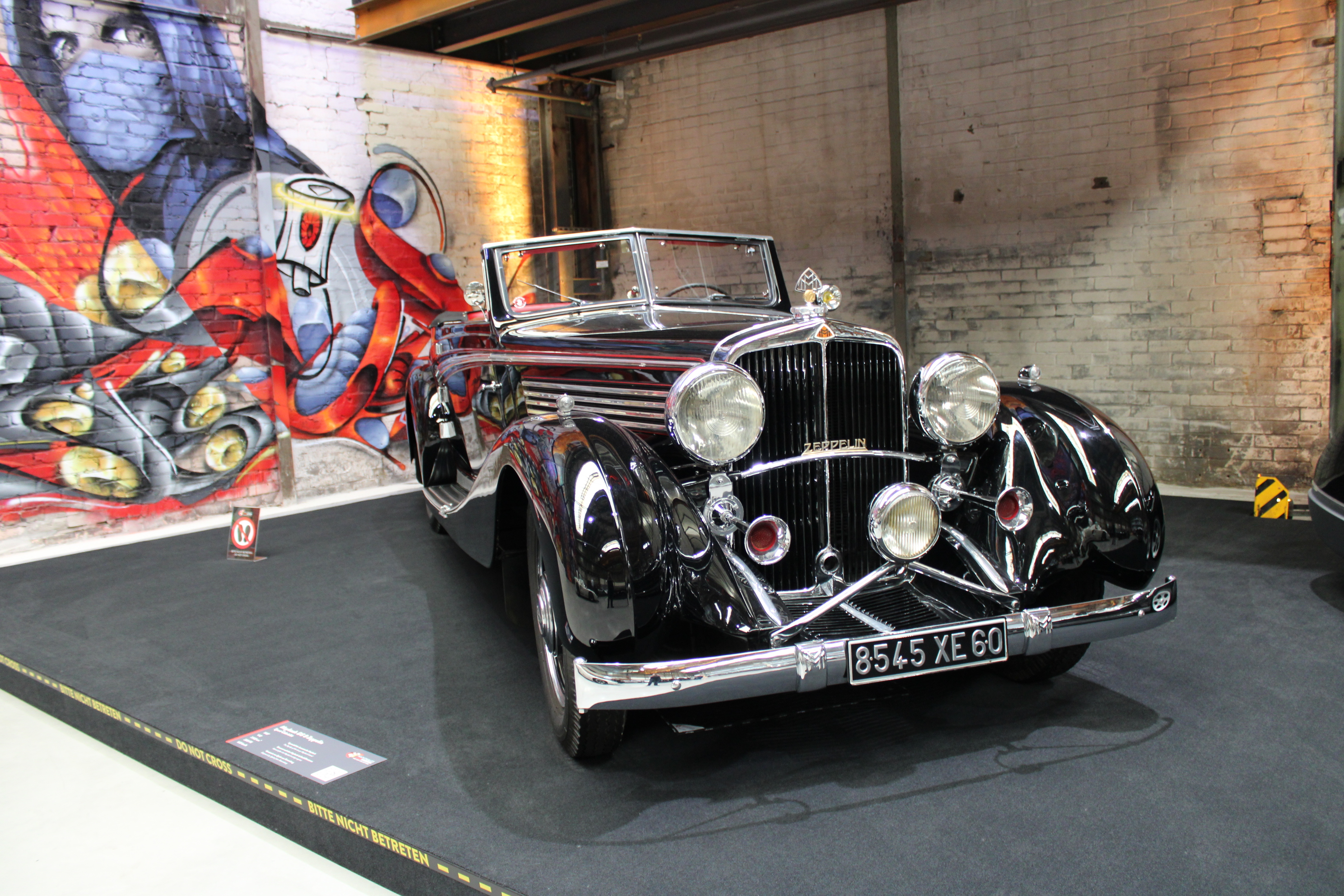
Maybach Zeppelin DS8 Sport Cabriolet

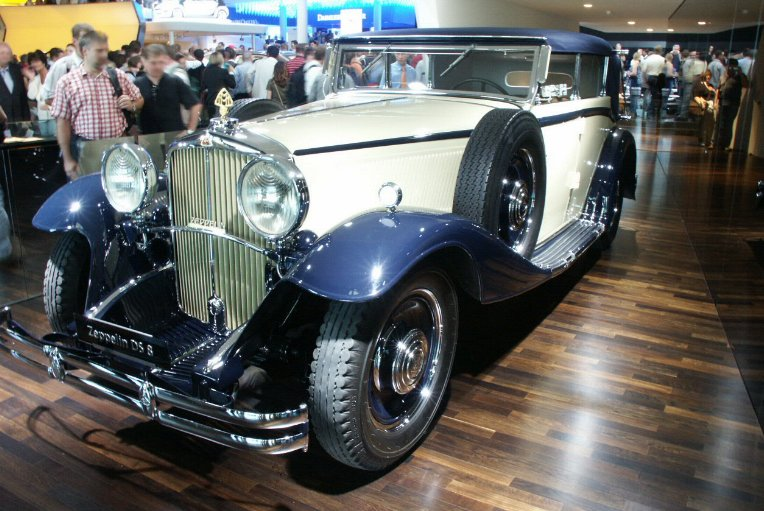
Maybach Zeppelin DS8

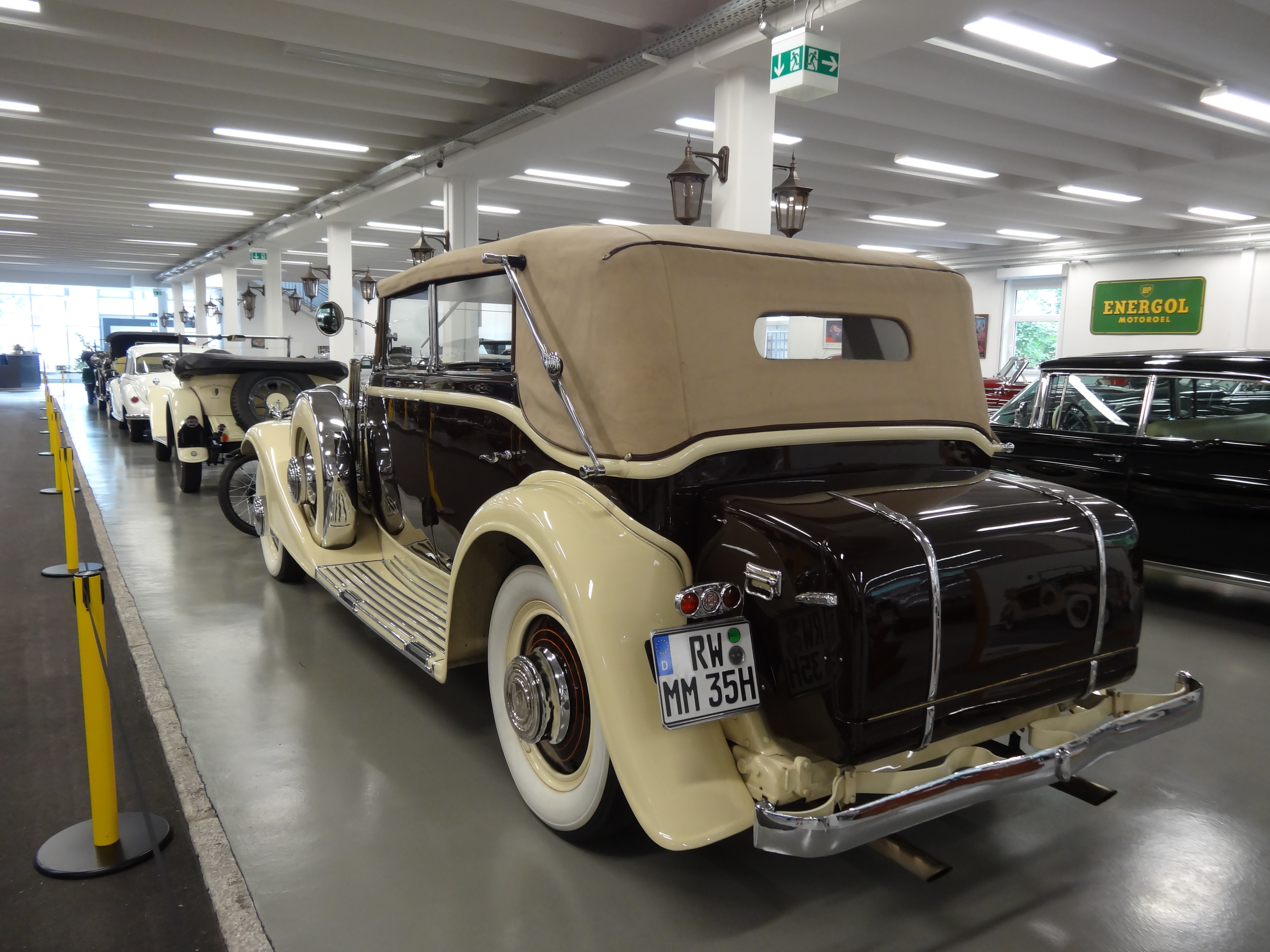
Maybach Zeppelin DS8

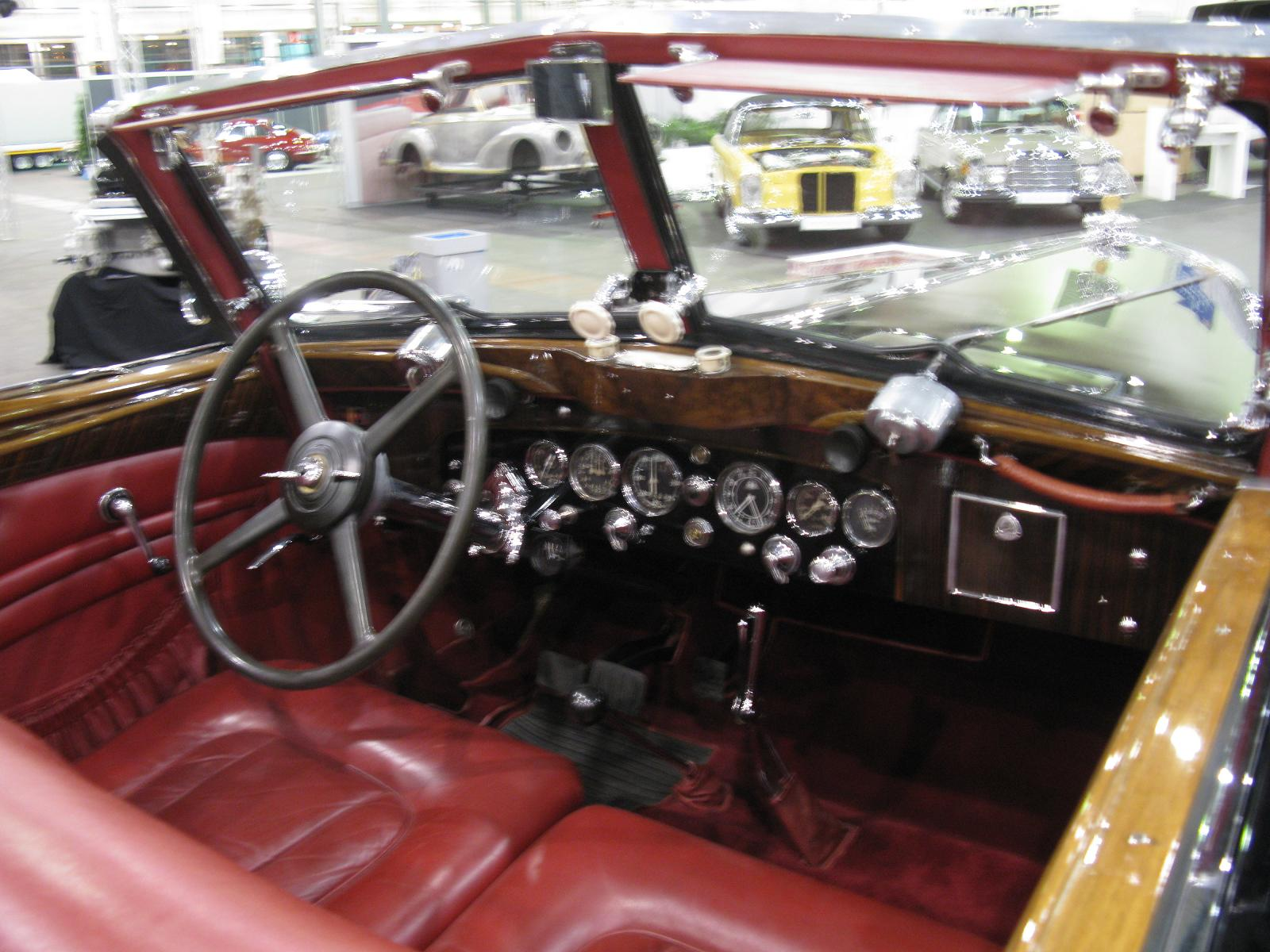
Interior of Maybach Zeppelin DS8
