= Frank Penn (cricketer, born 1884) =

English cricketer

Frank Penn (18 August 1884 – 23 April 1961) was an English amateur cricketer who played for Kent County Cricket Club.

Penn was born at Ousden in Suffolk in 1884, the son of Frank Penn who had played for Kent and once for the England cricket team in 1880. His father was prominent in Kent cricket and was President of the county club in 1905.

He was commissioned a second lieutenant in the 7th (Militia) Battalion of the Royal Fusiliers (City of London Regiment), but in November 1902 transferred to Royal East Kent Yeomanry, a yeomanry regiment.

Penn played in five first-class cricket matches for Kent, two in 1904 and three in 1905. He died at Bawdsey near Woodbridge in Suffolk in 1961 aged 76.

== Bibliography ==
- Carlaw, Derek (2020). Kent County Cricketers, A to Z: Part One (1806–1914) (PDF). Cardiff: ACS.
