= John Penn and Sons =

- Industry: Engineering
- Founded: 1799?
- Fate: Amalgamated, 1899
- Successor: Thames Iron Works Ship Building and Engineering Co.
- Headquarters: London, England
- Key people: John Penn
- Products: Marine steam engines

John Penn and Sons was an English engineering company based in London, and mainly known for its marine steam engines.

== History ==
=== Establishment ===
In 1799, engineer and millwright John Penn (born in Taunton, Somerset, 1770; died 6 June 1843) started an agricultural engineering business on the site at the junction of Blackheath and Lewisham Roads (close to modern-day Deptford Bridge) in south-east London. It grew in two decades to be one of the major engineering works in the London area. The focus of the firm remained in agriculture until the 1830s and 1840s, when Penn's son, also John Penn, took over the company and it began to specialise in building marine steam engines.

=== Marine steam ===
Penn Jr was an inventor of engines. One of the earliest engines he produced was the grasshopper beam engine, a six horsepower version being the first steam engine to power the machinery at the works. He shifted the focus of the works to marine engines. His 40-horsepower beam engines were fitted in the paddle steamers 'Ipswich' and 'Suffolk', and it is likely these were the first marine engines to be designed and built by Penn. He then focussed on improving the oscillating engine from the version patented by Aaron Manby in 1821. In 1844 he replaced the engines of the Admiralty yacht, HMS Black Eagle with oscillating engines of double the power, without increasing either the weight or space occupied, an achievement which broke the naval supply dominance of Boulton & Watt and Maudslay, Son & Field. His enhanced reputation due to this notable advancement was further augmented by Penn's introduction of trunk engines for driving screw propellers in vessels of war. HMS Encounter (1846) and HMS Arrogant (1848) were the first ships to be fitted with such engines and such was their efficacy that by the time of Penn's death in 1878, the engines had been fitted in 230 ships. Initially, ships were adapted to incorporate these engines, but in 1851, the Navy ordered its first ship specifically designed as a steam-screw auxiliary, HMS Agamemnon.

These advancements were coupled with a reputation for quality and reliability and this led to Penn becoming the major engine supplier to the Royal Navy as it made the transition from sail to steam. Penn was also responsible for introducing wood bearings for screw-propeller shafts which became vital to the worldwide use of steam-powered ships. This development of the lignum vitae stern bearing which enabled screw propeller ships to make oceanic voyages without wearing out their stern glands came in collaboration with Francis Pettit Smith. Other notable associations include his work on the application of superheated steam in marine engines.

Penn also produced the trunk engine for HMS Warrior and during construction was requested to develop an engine design for the RN gunboats being readied for the Crimean War. Penn chose his trunk engine design and subsequently produced 90 sets of what were the first mass-produced, high-pressure and high-revolution marine engines. At the Admiralty's insistence, they also used the Whitworth measurement standards throughout; Penn was a great friend of Joseph Whitworth, and employed the precision instruments and tools developed by him. The association with Whitworth was important in the development of mass-produced marine engines, as is clear from the obituary to Whitworth from The Times of 24 January 1887:

The Crimean War began, and Sir Charles Napier demanded of the Admiralty 120 gunboats, each with engines of 60 horsepower, for the campaign of 1855 in the Baltic. There were just ninety days in which to meet this requisition, and, short as the time was, the building of the gunboats presented no difficulty. It was otherwise however with the engines, and the Admiralty were in despair. Suddenly, by a flash of the mechanical genius which was inherent in him, the late Mr John Penn solved the difficulty, and solved it quite easily.

He had a pair of engines on hand of the exact size. He took them to pieces and he distributed the parts among the best machine shops in the country, telling each to make ninety sets exactly in all respects to the sample. The orders were executed with unfailing regularity, and he actually completed ninety sets of engines of 60 horsepower in ninety days – a feat which made the great Continental Powers stare with wonder, and which was possible only because the Whitworth standards of measurement and of accuracy and finish were by that time thoroughly recognised and established throughout the country.

The engine recovered from the wreck of the SS Xantho is of the gunboat type. Built (or assembled) in 1861, it is the only known example, and in being recovered intact was found to have all its fittings and fixtures attached including Penn's nameplate. It is on display at the Western Australian Museum.

John Penn's firm was a major employer in the Greenwich area with 1800 employed at its Greenwich and Deptford works at its peak. John Penn and Sons was considered the best-equipped marine engineering works and Penn a model employer. He recognised the value of skilled employees through pensions and awarded Christmas gifts. His works also provided the education for a whole generation of marine engineers.

=== Amalgamation ===
It was amalgamated with the Thames Ironworks and Shipbuilding Company in 1899 under the name of Thames Iron Works, Shipbuilding and Engineering Company. The combined company failed in 1912.
