= Stave bearing =

Simple journal bearing

A stave bearing is a simple journal bearing where a shaft rotates in a bearing housing. Rather than the usual arrangement where the fixed part of the bearing surrounds most of the circumference of the shaft in one or two pieces, a stave bearing uses a large number of axial staves to support the shaft. A large housing is made with grooves running along the shaft, these grooves being filled with strips of suitable material, originally wood.

== Uses ==
Stave bearings have long been associated with ships and their propeller shafts. The bearing is suitable for slow speeds and high loads. When used on ships, the bearing is designed to run immersed in water, allowing its use outboard of the stern gland or stuffing box.

Stave bearings are also well suited to applications such as rudder shafts, where rotation is intermittent and reciprocating, rather than continuous and unidirectional. Other bearing types, such as some ball bearings, don't perform well under this type of use and may fail prematurely.

== Materials ==
Stave bearings in ships must resist the forces in the bearing and offer adequate lubrication from the water alone. They must also survive long-term immersion without rotting, softening or swelling. The historical material used for this was the tropical hardwood timber lignum vitae. In modern practice, Tufnol is often used. Recent developments in composites have seen polyester resin and phenolic resin composites such as Feroform, ACM, Maritex and Orkot being used as well as elastomeric polymer materials from Thordon Bearings.

Nitrile rubber and UHMW-polyethylene have also been used. The tradename "Cutless" is a registered trademark owned by Duramax Marine. The name refers to a molded rubber bearing manufactured by Duramax Marine. The tradename "Cutless" is used for these rubber bearings and this name has also, along with its misspelling 'Cutlass', become a generic term for them.

Vesconite Hilube is widely used for propeller shafts because the self-lubricating, homogeneous material has a low coefficient of friction (typically 0.10 to 0.12). The result is a long wear-life. Shaft vibration can be reduced with Vesconite because it can be machined to tight tolerances to achieve small running clearances. This article in the Yachting Journal explains how a rubber bearing was replaced with Vesconite Hilube for this reason.

Where used on small boats, the bearing is often moulded in one cylindrical piece of rubber, although the inner surface is grooved so that it still functions as a stave bearing. Although small, these rubber bearings are still capable of handling a high power, even a 2,350 hp record-breaker like Bluebird K4.

The use of non-metallic bearing materials may also simplify problems with electrolytic corrosion between shaft and housing.

== Cooling ==
Although immersion alone is often sufficient to lubricate the bearing, additional cooling and also flushing away of any gritty particles that could cause damage may be achieved on large ships by a pumped flow of water to the inboard end of the bearing. This flow passes along grooves in the bearing surface, leading outboard. A low pressure of around 5 psi is adequate.
