= Lee, London =

Area of south east London, England

Coordinates: 51.4522°N 0.0086°E

Lee
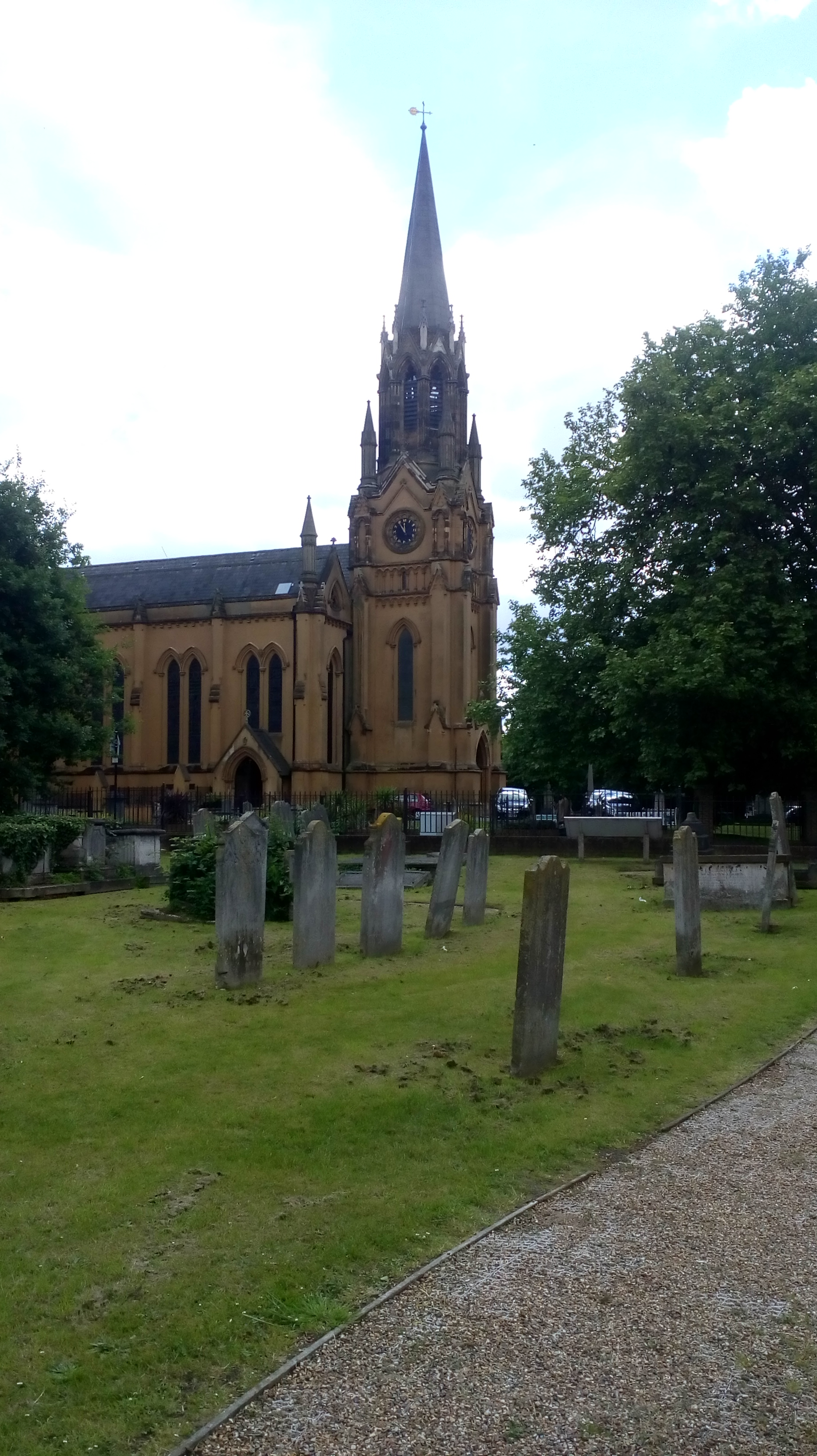
- St Margaret's Church, Lee, rebuilt between 1839 and 1841

- Location within Greater London
- Population: 14,573 (Lee Green ward, 2011 Census)
- OS grid reference: TQ395745
- London borough: Lewisham; Greenwich
- Ceremonial county: Greater London
- Region: London
- Country: England
- Sovereign state: United Kingdom
- Post town: LONDON
- Postcode district: SE12
- Dialling code: 020
- Police: Metropolitan
- Fire: London
- Ambulance: London
- UK Parliament: Lewisham East
- London Assembly: Greenwich and Lewisham; Greenwich and Lewisham

Lee, also known as Lee Green, is an area of South East London, England, straddling the border of the London Borough of Lewisham and the Royal Borough of Greenwich. It is located northwest of Eltham and southeast of Lewisham. It was in Kent before becoming part of the County of London in 1889, and then Greater London in 1965.

The churchyard of St Margaret's Church (current church rebuilt 1839–41, architect: John Brown) is the burial place of three Astronomers Royal: Edmond Halley, Nathaniel Bliss and John Pond.

== History ==
=== Early history ===
A map showing the Lee wards of Lewisham Metropolitan Borough as they appeared in 1916.

The Manor of Lee was a historic parish of the Blackheath hundred and existed up to 1900 when it along with the parish of Lewisham became part of the Metropolitan Borough of Lewisham. While modern Lee is centred on Lee railway station and the road of Burnt Ash Hill, the parish was based around Lee High Road which today stretches into the town centre of Lewisham. The River Quaggy formed much of the boundary between the two parishes, though at Lee Bridge (at the western end of Lee High Road) it is now almost completely hidden.

The Lee Manor Society have produced a comprehensive history of the area. The Domesday Book of 1086 describes Lee as a small area of cultivation set in extensive woodland. The earliest map available (Rocque's Country Near Ten Miles Round map of 1746) shows a cluster of about a dozen houses around a triangular village green. This hamlet was then largely surrounded by fields, with the Wricklemarsh estate of Sir Gregory Page to the north, and a manor house (Lee Place) to the north-west, with St Margaret's Church just beyond. Lee Green Farm occupied the south-east quadrant from the 1660s (roughly on the site of the present Leegate shopping centre). The farm was demolished in the 1840s and rebuilt as Tudor House further east.

The Old Tiger's Head and the New Tiger's Head pubs are important and striking features of the crossroads. Confusingly, the original (Old) Tiger's Head is thought to have been built on the site currently occupied by the New Tiger's Head. The original pub is thought to have been built before 1730. It was rebuilt on its present site, the north-west quadrant, in 1750–1770 and then rebuilt (in its third incarnation) in 1896 – the date carried on its frontage. It became an important mail and coaching inn. The New Tiger's Head started life as a beer shop known as the Tiger Tavern in the 1830s. It was situated in the end of four cottages known as Prospect Terrace, built around the same time. Three of these cottages remain, housing a post office/newsagent and a hairdresser. In 1868 it is referred to as the Tiger's Head Inn. The present building is thought to have replaced the original cottage a few years after 1896 – the date of the rebuilding of the Old Tiger's Head. The New Tiger's Head has now closed down.

=== 19th century ===
In 1815 cavalry and foot regiments passed through Lee Green on their way to the Battle of Waterloo:

"The space in front of the Tiger's Head and the Green were very commodious for the transfer of baggage to the waggons of the farmers from the other side of London to those of the farmers in this neighbourhood which were pressed for that purpose, to convey them 15 miles further on the journey to Dover."

Lee is where, in 1837, Robert Cocking died in the first parachute accident.

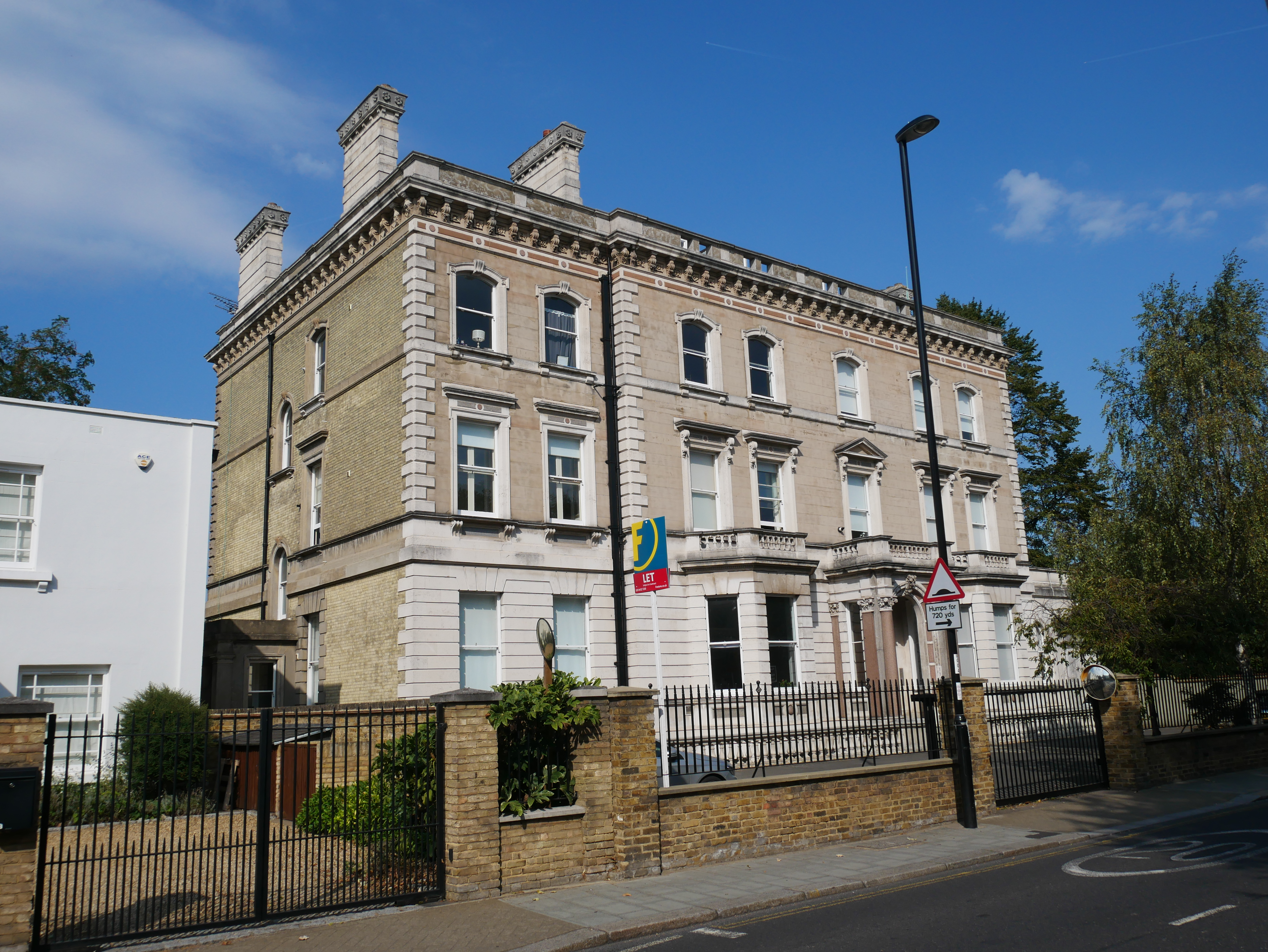
The 19th-century 7 and 9 Lee Terrace, a Grade II listed structure

In the early nineteenth century boxing matches took place at the Old Tiger's Head. Horse racing and (human) foot racing took place in the 1840s but the police put a stop to these events, probably under pressure from local citizens. At that time the green was the centre of village life with cricket matches, bare knuckle boxing and other entertainments. In the 1850s further housebuilding prompted the installation of proper sewers and the Lee Green horse pond was filled in. In the 1860s John Pound, a developer, erected houses in the south-east quadrant, Orchard Terrace on Eltham Road and Crown Terrace on Burnt Ash Lane (now Road).

The opening of Lee station in 1866 prompted more housebuilding at the crossroads. The site of Lee Green Farm was built on as Carston Mews. In the same year Charles Henry Reed, a linen draper, moves into 1 Orchard Terrace and established a department store. Reed died in 1895 and in 1903 the business was taken over by Griffith & Co.

In the south-west quadrant the Prince Arthur pub was built at 422 Lee High Road in 1870 (closed 2005). It was originally one of a row of early nineteenth-century cottages of which three – nos 424–428 – survived behind modern shop fronts. In 1898 No 345 Lee High Road was built in front of the former Old Tiger's Head stables. It incorporated a fire station but the London County Council built a replacement in 1906 in Eltham Road. It is still in use. A police station was built at 418 Lee High Road in 1904, replacing one built before 1860. It was converted to apartments in 2003.

=== 20th century to now ===
On 1 April 1904 the civil parish was abolished and merged with Lewisham. At the 1901 census (the last before the abolition of the parish), Lee had a population of 18,649. In the early 1960s the south-east quadrant, including Carston Mews, was demolished to make way for Leegate shopping centre. This declined following the opening of Sainsbury's on the opposite side of Burnt Ash Road in the late 1980s. Owners of the centre, St. Modwen Properties have recently proposed a £40m regeneration plan for the centre, including the demolition of the current shopping precinct to be replaced with an Asda supermarket as well as the conversion of the existing office block into a hotel.

== Notable residents ==
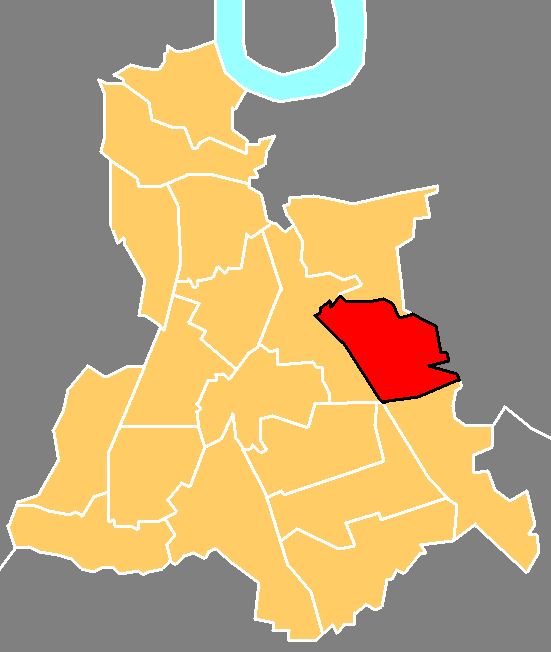
The electoral ward of Lee Green (red) within the London Borough of Lewisham (orange). The River Thames is in blue.

- Sir Francis Baring, founder of Baring Brothers Bank (now defunct), bought the Manor House (attributed to architect Richard Jupp) in Manor Lane (now a library and its grounds a public park, Manor House Gardens) in 1796.
- Henry Thomas Buckle, historian and author of the History of Civilization in England, was born in Lee.
- Poet Ernest Dowson was born in Lee.
- Poet U. A. Fanthorpe was born in Lee.
- Actor James Robertson Justice was born in Lee in 1907.
- Actor Jude Law
- Musician Manfred Mann lived in Southbrook Road in Lee.
- Philosopher, sociologist and economic historian Karl Marx lived at Lee for a short period during the 19th century
- John Mayall lived in Lee Green. Eric Clapton stayed with him during the recording sessions of the album Blues Breakers with Eric Clapton
- Schoolboy murder victim Jimmy Mizen
- Sir Gregory Page built a large mansion house (demolished in 1787) at Wricklemarsh in Lee.
- Mechanical engineer John Penn died at his home, The Cedars, Lee on 23 September 1878, and was subsequently buried at nearby St Margaret's Church.
- Reggie Schwarz, South African cricketer, was born in Lee.
- Comedian Arthur Smith briefly lived in Lee while he attended Roan Boys' Grammar School
- Sir Denis Thatcher, husband of Margaret Thatcher, was born in Lee.
- Stanley Unwin, publisher, lived in Handen Road.
- Max Wall, actor and comedian
- Estelle Winwood, English stage and screen actress who later lived in the US; at the time of her death at 101, she was the oldest member in the history of the Screen Actors Guild.

== Gallery ==
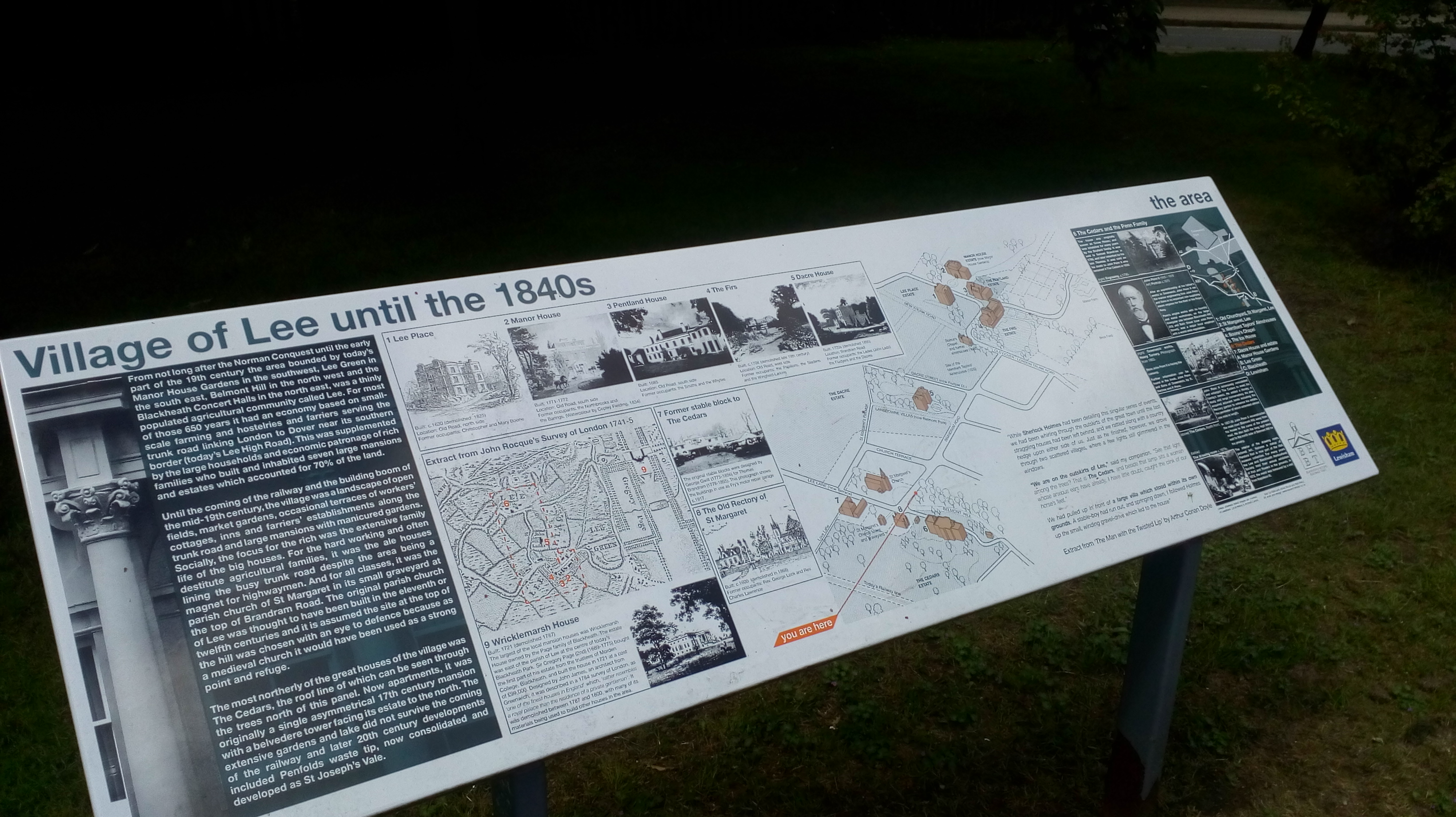
History board of the village of Lee

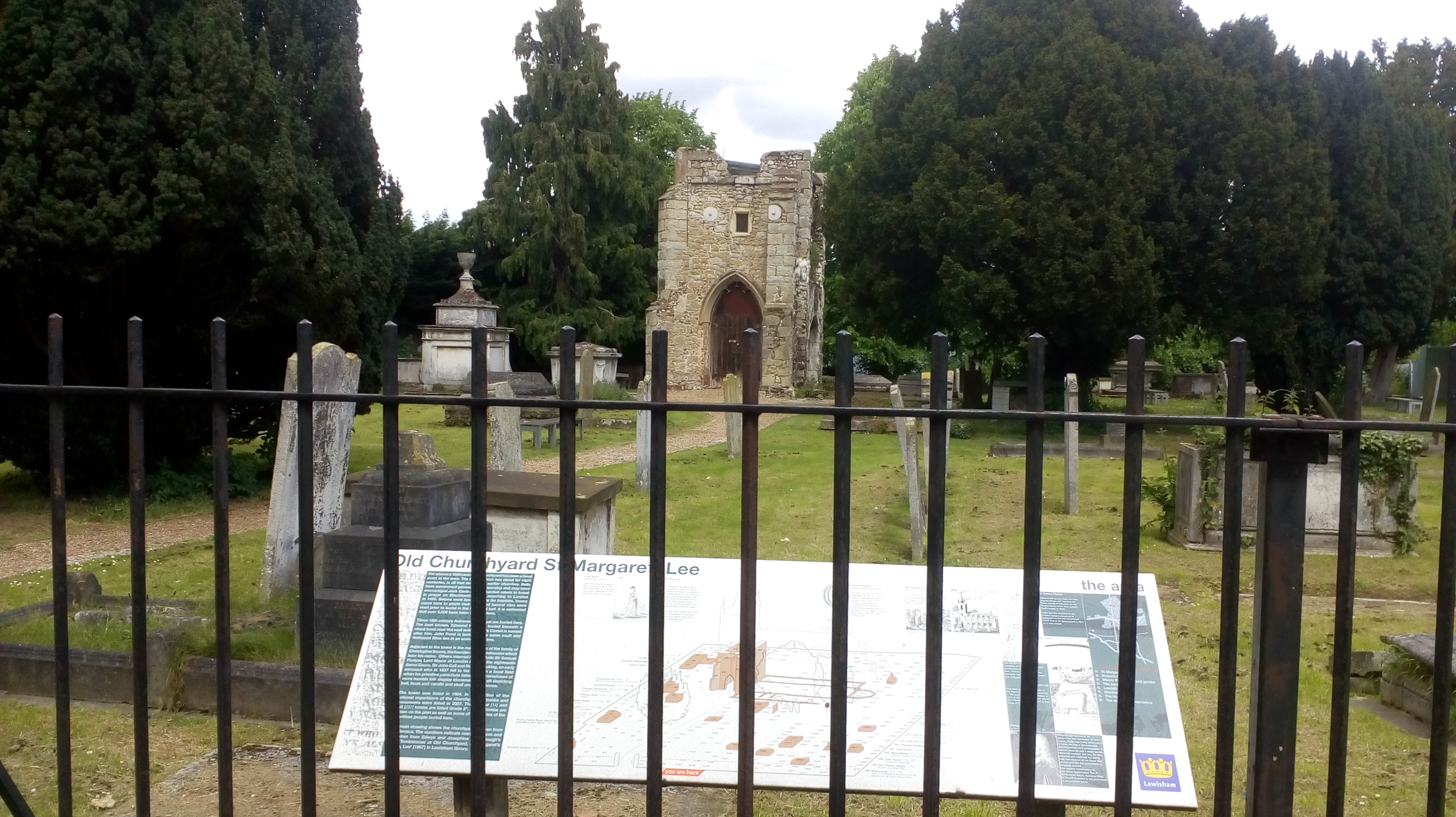
The old church yard and ruins of Old St Margaret's Church in Lee. The ruins of the old church are thought to be at least eight centuries old

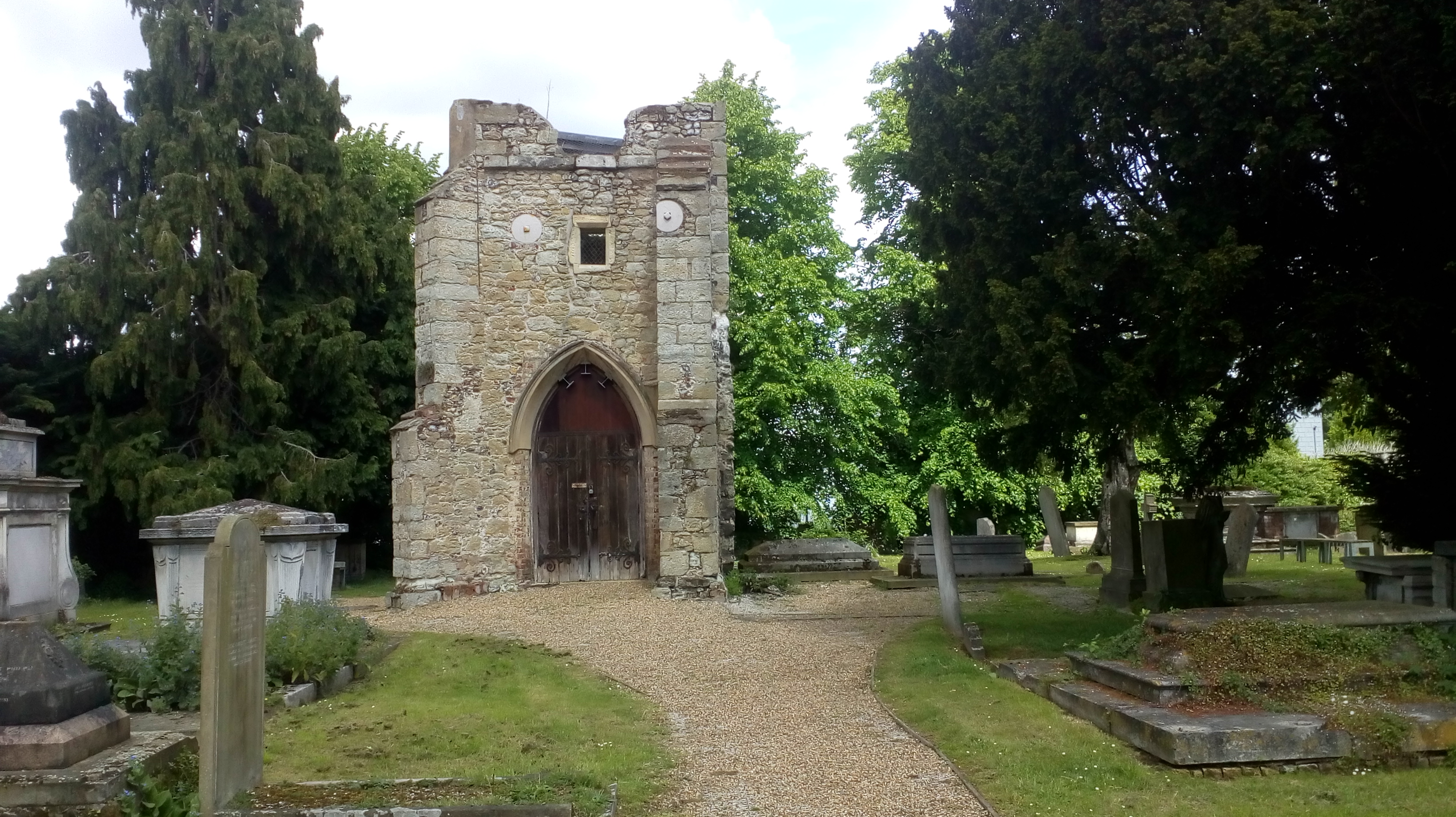
Ruins of Old St Margaret's Church in Lee. The ruins are thought to be at least eight centuries old

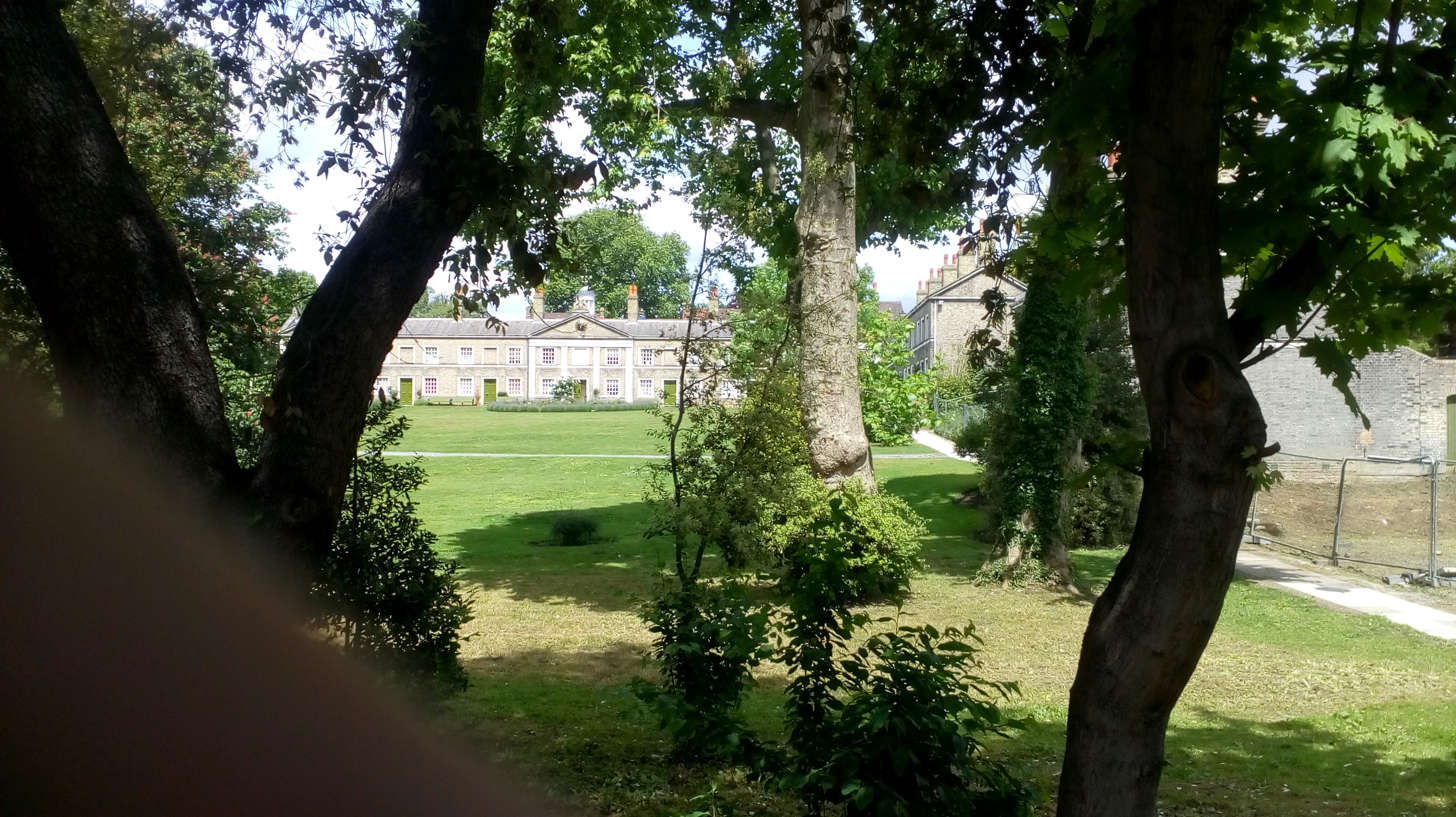
Merchant Taylor's Almshouses in Lee

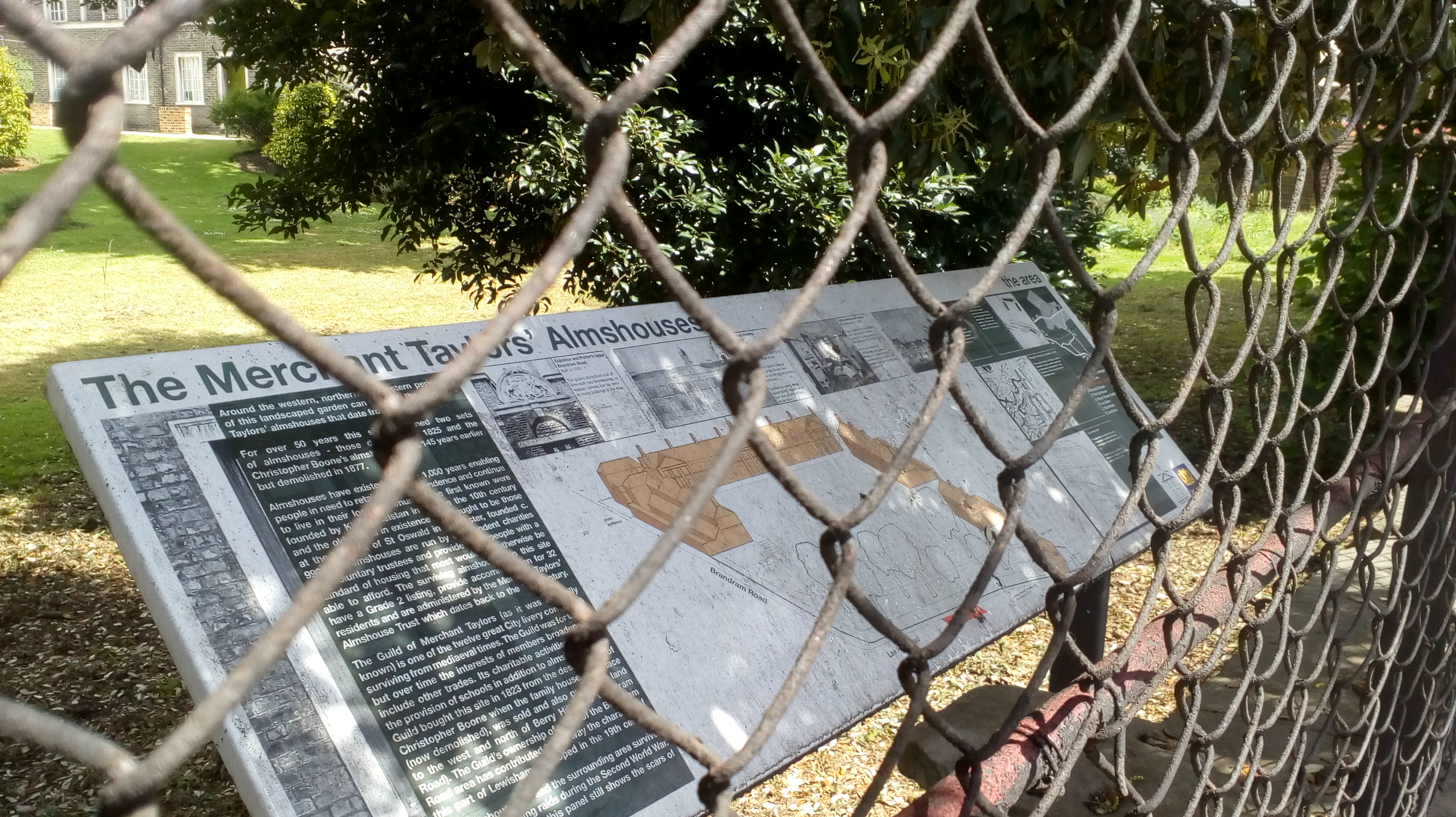
History board for Merchant Taylor's Almshouses in Lee

== Transport ==
=== Road ===
Lee High Road is the major road through the area and forms part of the A20 road.

=== Rail ===
Lee station serves the area with National Rail services to London Charing Cross, London Cannon Street via Lewisham, Woolwich Arsenal & Gravesend.

=== Buses ===
Lee is served by London Buses routes 122, 160, 178, 202, 261, 273, 321, 621, 660 & N21. These connect it with areas including Blackheath, Bromley, Catford, Chislehurst, Crystal Palace, Eltham, Grove Park, Kidbrooke, Lewisham, New Cross, Petts Wood, Plumstead, Sidcup, Sydenham & Woolwich.
