= 1978 New Year Honours =

British royal recognitions

The New Year Honours 1978 were appointments in many of the Commonwealth realms of Queen Elizabeth II to various orders and honours to reward and highlight good works by citizens of those countries, to celebrate the year passed and mark the beginning of 1978. They were announced on 31 December 1977 for the United Kingdom, Australia, New Zealand, Mauritius, Fiji, the Bahamas, Grenada, and Papua New Guinea.

The recipients of honours are displayed here as they were styled before their new honour, and arranged by honour, with classes (Knight, Knight Grand Cross, etc.) and then divisions (Military, Civil, etc.) as appropriate.

== United Kingdom and Colonies ==
=== Life Peer ===
Baroness

- Betty Lockwood, chairman, Equal Opportunities Commission.

Baron

- Sir Douglas Albert Vivian Allen, GCB, Head of the Home Civil Service and Permanent Secretary, Civil Service Department.
- Lieutenant Colonel The Right Honourable Sir Martin Michael Charles Charteris, GCB, GCVO, OBE. Lately Private Secretary to The Queen and Keeper of Her Majesty's Archives.
- Oliver Ross McGregor, Professor of Social Institutions, University of London.
- Michael Young. Lately Chairman, National Consumer Council. Chairman, Mutual Aid Centre.

=== Privy Counsellor ===
- John Dennis Concannon, MP, Minister of State, Northern Ireland Office. Member of Parliament for the Mansfield Division of Nottinghamshire.
- David John Denzil Davies, MP, Minister of State, HM Treasury. Member of Parliament for Llanelli.
- John William Gilbert, MP, Minister of State, Ministry of Defence. Member of Parliament for Dudley East.
- Charles Richard Morris, MP, Minister of State, Civil Service Department. Member of Parliament for the Openshaw Division of Manchester.

=== Knight Bachelor ===
- Kenneth James Priestley Barraclough, CBE, TD. Chief Metropolitan Magistrate, Lord Chancellor's Department.
- David Robert Bates, FRS, Research Professor of Theoretical Physics, Queen's University of Belfast.
- William John Hughes Butterfield, OBE, Regius Professor of Physic, University of Cambridge.
- Charles Frederick Carter, FBA. Vice-chancellor, University of Lancaster.
- Ronald Ellis, Head of Defence Sales, Ministry of Defence.
- James Campbell Fraser, managing director, Dunlop Holdings Ltd. For services to Export.
- James Finlay Elder Gilchrist, OBE. Lately Chairman, Harrisons & Crosfield Ltd. For services to Export.
- Henry Thomas Hopkinson, CBE. For services to Journalism.
- William Elwyn Edwards Jones. For public service in Wales.
- Hector Laing, chairman, United Biscuits (Holdings) Ltd. For services to Export.
- Commander John Duncan Lock, chairman, Association of District Councils of England & Wales.
- David Blackstock McNee, QPM, Commissioner, Metropolitan Police.
- Malcolm John Methven, Director-General, Confederation of British Industry.
- Leslie Frederick Murphy, chairman, National Enterprise Board.
- Kenneth Leslie Newman, Chief Constable, Royal Ulster Constabulary.
- Peter Neville Luard Pears, CBE, Singer. For services to Music.
- Joseph Raymond Lynden Potter, chairman, The Halifax Building Society.
- Peter Wendel Seligman, CBE, lately chairman, A.P.V. Holdings Ltd. For services to Export.
- Andrew Akiba Shonfield, Director, Royal Institute of International Affairs.
- Professor George Algernon Smart, Director, British Postgraduate Medical Federation.
- George Fenwick Smith, CBE, General Secretary, Union of Construction, Allied Trades and Technicians.
- John Richard Nicholas Stone, CBE, FBA, Leake Professor of Finance & Accounting, University of Cambridge.
- Arthur Sugden, chief executive officer, Co-operative Wholesale Society Ltd.
- Professor Thomas Symington, lately Director, Institute of Cancer Research.
- Francis Leonard Tombs, chairman, Electricity Council.
- Walter Winterbottom, CBE. For services to Sport.

Diplomatic Service and Overseas List

- Sze-Yuen Chung, CBE. For public services in Hong Kong.
- Ernest Howard Davis, CMG, OBE, Deputy Governor, Gibraltar.

Australian States

State of Victoria

- The Honourable Mr. Justice Murray Vincent McInerney, Judge of the Supreme Court of Victoria.
- James Charles McNeill, CBE, of Canterbury. For services to the State through industry.

State of Queensland

- Anthony Thomas Covacevich, DFC, of Cairns. For services to the welfare of the people of North Queensland.
- Lionel Joseph McCray, of Ascot. For services to the business community and people of Queensland.

=== Order of the Bath ===
==== Knight Grand Cross of the Order of the Bath (GCB) ====
Military Division

Army

- General Sir Jack Harman, KCB, OBE, MC, ADC Gen. (123536), Colonel Commandant Royal Armoured Corps, Colonel 1st The Queen's Dragoon Guards.

Royal Air Force

- Air Chief Marshal Sir Michael Beetham, KCB, CBE, DFC, AFC, ADC.

Civil Division

- Sir William Dennis Pile, KCB, MBE, chairman, Board of Inland Revenue.

==== Knight Commander of the Order of the Bath (KCB) ====
Military Division

Royal Navy

- Vice Admiral Richard Pilkington Clayton.
- Vice Admiral Anthony Storrs Morton.

Army

- Lieutenant General Timothy May Creasey, CB, OBE (350206), Colonel Commandant The Queen's Division, Deputy Colonel (Norfolk, Suffolk & Cambridgeshire) The Royal Anglian Regiment, Colonel Commandant Small Arms School Corps.

Royal Air Force

- Acting Air Marshal Frederick Beresford Sowrey, CB, CBE, AFC.
- Acting Air Marshal Peter David George Terry, CB, AFC.

Civil Division

- James Arnot Hamilton, CB, MBE, Permanent Under-Secretary of State, Department of Education & Science.
- Arthur Patrick Hockaday, CB, CMG, Second Permanent Under-Secretary of State, Ministry of Defence.
- Peter Sansome Preston, CB, Permanent Secretary, Ministry of Overseas Development.
- Anthony Keith Rawlinson, CB, Second Permanent Secretary, HM Treasury.

==== Companion of the Order of the Bath (CB) ====
Military Division

Royal Navy

- Rear Admiral Oswald Nigel Amherst Cecil.
- Rear Admiral Thomas Buckhurst Homan.
- Rear Admiral Benjamin Cubitt Perowne.
- Major General Robert Percival Walter Wall, Royal Marines.

Army

- Major General Peter Blunt, MBE, GM (335303), Colonel Commandant Royal Corps of Transport, Honorary Colonel 160 Transport Regiment Royal Corps of Transport (Volunteers), Territorial & Army Volunteer Reserve.
- Major General Kenneth Gardiner Galloway, OBE, QHDS (150137), late Royal Army Dental Corps.
- Major General John David Carew Graham, CBE (243024), late The Parachute Regiment
- Major General Anthony George Clifford Jones, MC (251031), late Corps of Royal Engineers.
- Major General William Desmond Mangham (303693), late Royal Regiment of Artillery.
- Major General Henry Arthur John Sturge (379385), Colonel Commandant Royal Corps of Signals.
- Major General Denys Broomfield Wood (307281), late Corps of Royal Electrical and Mechanical Engineers.

Royal Air Force

- Air Vice-Marshal Donald Laurence Attlee, MVO, (Retired).
- Air Vice-Marshal Alan David Dick, CBE, AFC.
- Air Vice-Marshal Charles Robert Griffin, QHS.
- Air Vice-Marshal Philip Michael Sweatman Hedgeland, OBE.
- Air Vice-Marshal Basil Goodhand Lock, CBE, AFC.

Civil Division

- Ernest Victor Adams, Deputy Secretary, Board of Inland Revenue.
- William Cartwright Beckett, Legal Secretary, Law Officers' Department.
- Maurice Francis Bond, MVO, OBE, Principal Clerk, Information Services, and Clerk of the Records, House of Lords.
- John David Brierley, Under Secretary, Department of Education & Science.
- James Carver, lately Chief Inspector of Mines and Quarries, Department of Employment.
- John Frederick Thomas Cheetham, Secretary, Exchequer and Audit Department.
- Keith Dexter, Director General, Agricultural Development & Advisory Service.
- Jeffery Raymond Ede, Keeper of Public Records, Lord Chancellor's Department.
- William Kerr Fraser, Deputy Secretary, Scottish Office.
- Derek Ivens Archibald Hamblen, OBE, lately Principal Director, Ministry of Defence.
- Alistair Robert Morton Jaffray, Deputy Under Secretary, Ministry of Defence.
- Thomas Philip Jones, Deputy Secretary, Department of Energy.
- William Daniel Lacey, CBE, Deputy Secretary, Property Services Agency, Department of the Environment.
- Geoffrey John Otton, Deputy Secretary, Department of Health and Social Security.
- Geoffrey Penrice, Under Secretary, Departments of the Environment & Transport.
- Harry Wilfrid Pout, OBE, Deputy Controller Aircraft "D", Ministry of Defence.
- Philip Waller Ridley, CBE, Deputy Secretary, Department of Industry.
- Kenneth Reeve Shimeld, Permanent Secretary, Department of the Civil Service for Northern Ireland.
- Jack Edward Clive Thornton, OBE, Under Secretary, Ministry of Overseas Development.

=== Order of Saint Michael and Saint George ===
==== Knight Grand Cross of the Order of St Michael and St George (GCMG) ====
Diplomatic Service and Overseas List

- Sir John Johnston, KCMG, KCVO, British High Commissioner, Ottawa.
- The Honourable Sir Peter Ramsbotham, GCVO, KCMG, Governor and Commander-in-Chief, Bermuda.

==== Knight Commander of the Order of St Michael and St George (KCMG) ====
Diplomatic Service and Overseas List

- Sir John Moreton, KCVO, CMG, MC, lately Minister, HM Embassy, Washington.
- James Murray, CMG, Minister and Deputy Permanent Representative, United Kingdom Mission to the United Nations, New York.
- Harold Smedley, CMG, MBE, British High Commissioner, Wellington.
- John Adam Thomson, CMG, British High Commissioner, New Delhi.

==== Companion of the Order of St Michael and St George (CMG) ====
- Harald Fairbairn Christopherson, Commissioner, Board of Customs and Excise.
- Alexander Roualeyn Gordon-Cumming, CVO, Counsellor (Aviation & Shipping), HM Embassy, Washington.

Diplomatic Service and Overseas List

- David Akers-Jones, Secretary for the New Territories, Hong Kong.
- Kenneth Roy Crook, HM Ambassador, Kabul.
- Stephen Loftus Egerton, HM Consul-General, Rio de Janeiro.
- Richard Mark Evans, Minister (Economic), HM Embassy, Paris.
- George Edmund Hall, Assistant Under-Secretary of State, Foreign and Commonwealth Office.
- Frederick Hume Jackson, OBE, HM Consul-General, Düsseldorf.
- David Wylie McDonald, Director of Public Works, Hong Kong.
- Peter Donovan McEntee, OBE, Governor and Commander-in-Chief, Belize.
- Patrick Hamilton Moberly, Assistant Under-Secretary of State, Foreign & Commonwealth Office.
- James Roland Walter Parker, OBE, Governor and Commander-in-Chief, Falkland Islands.
- Harold Martin Smith Reid, Counsellor, Foreign & Commonwealth Office.
- Fernley Gordon Rogers, OBE, Administrative Officer, Senior Staff Grade, Nigeria.
- Frederick Allan Rowley, OBE, MC, Counsellor, Foreign & Commonwealth Office.
- Alan Bedford Urwick, Minister, HM Embassy, Madrid.
- Patrick Richard Henry Wright, HM Ambassador, Luxembourg.

Australian States

State of New South Wales

- Lloyd Frederic Rees. For services to art.

State of Victoria

- John Joseph McGee, of Malyern. For services to the community.

State of Queensland

- Neil Milne Gow, of Pullenvale. For services to industry and commerce.

State of Western Australia

- Sheila Mary Kenworthy, OBE, of Dalkeith. For services to the community, through activities in the field of law and in the interests of women.

=== Royal Victorian Order ===
==== Knight Commander of the Royal Victorian Order (KCVO) ====
- Richard Ian Samuel Bayliss.
- Henry Ernest Marking, CBE, MC.
- Colonel The Right Honourable John Aylmer, Earl of Stair, CVO, MBE.
- Admiral Sir Frank Roddam Twiss, KCB, DSC.

==== Commander of the Royal Victorian Order (CVO) ====
- Major General Nigel Thomas Bagnall, MC.
- Captain Ian Mosley Clegg, Royal Navy (Retd).
- Commander David Laurence Cobb, Royal Navy (Retd).
- Colonel James Ainsworth Campden Gabriel Eyre, OBE.
- James Valentine Edwards.
- Surgeon Captain Philip Charles Fulford, MVO, OBE, Royal Navy.
- Assistant Commissioner Henry James Ellis Hunt, CBE, Metropolitan Police.
- Vivian David Lipman.
- Vice Admiral Dennis Howard Mason, CB.
- Peter Jack Matthews, OBE, QPM, Chief Constable, Surrey Constabulary.
- Alexander John Buckley Rutherford, CBE.
- Group Captain John Francis Humphrey Tetley, Royal Air Force.
- Lieutenant Colonel John Riddell Bromhead Walker, MVO, MC.
- Kenneth Burwood Walter.
- Captain Gordon Frank Walwyn, Royal Navy.

==== Member of the Royal Victorian Order, 4th class (MVO) ====
- Lieutenant Colonel Paul Robin Adair, Coldstream Guards.
- David Culbert Boyd.
- Lieutenant Colonel John Campbell Hardy, Royal Marines.
- Eileen Elsie Harrison.
- Captain Christopher Hope Layman, Royal Navy.
- Philip Fairfax Mason.
- Squadron Leader James Gracie Millar, DFC, Royal Air Force.
- Lieutenant Colonel Trevor Clemesha Morris, The Blues and Royals.
- Commander Donald William Pike, Royal Navy.
- Elizabeth Barbara Buckley Sharp, OBE.
- Edward Kenneth Timings.
- Chief Superintendent Michael John Trestrail, Metropolitan Police.

==== Member of the Royal Victorian Order, 5th class (MVO) ====
- Sidney Ayles, MBE.
- Marcus Ernest Bishop.
- Margaret Mary Dalglish.
- Lieutenant Commander Peter Michael Franklyn, Royal Navy.
- Marion Brown Graham.
- Ernest Leslie Hyde.
- Nellie Phelps.
- Flight Lieutenant Walter Brian Sowerby, Royal Air Force.

==== Medal of the Royal Victorian Order (RVM) ====
In Silver

- J4239165 Sergeant Stewart Harry Gerald Abbott, Royal Air Force.
- Frederick Henry George Bates.
- Reginald Brind.
- 23835142 Staff Sergeant Raymond Calow, Royal Engineers.
- T9133253 Chief Technician Peter Malcolm Dale, Royal Air Force.
- Alfred Edward Davies.
- Harold Arthur Dean.
- Anthony Frederick Eckles.
- Ivy Gwendoline Field.
- Fleet Chief Control Electrical Artificer Richard Alan Field, M667786D.
- Mabel Gordon.
- Police Constable Eric Frederick John Groves, Metropolitan Police.
- Keith Douglas Haywood.
- M4073248 Warrant Officer Andrew Manson, Royal Air Force Regiment.
- James Mason.
- Alfred Francis Gates.
- Chief Marine Engineering Mechanic Brian Victor Roberson, K965829W.
- Police Constable William Sidney Alfred Sibley, Metropolitan Police.
- Jack Stannett.
- Chief Petty Officer Writer Alexander Peter Terry, M912984W.
- James Williams.

==== Bar to the Royal Victorian Medal ====
In Silver

- Sergeant Major Charles Douglas Maxted, MM, Her Majesty's Bodyguard of the Yeomen of the Guard.

=== Order of the British Empire ===
==== Dame Grand Cross of the Order of the British Empire (GBE) ====
Civil Division

- Isobel Baillie, CBE (Mrs. Wrigley). For services to Music.

Diplomatic Service and Overseas List

- Meere Uatioa. For services to the community in the Gilbert Islands.

==== Knight Commander of the Order of the British Empire (KBE) ====
Military Division

Royal Navy

- Vice Admiral Roderick Douglas Macdonald, CBE.

Civil Division
Diplomatic Service and Overseas List

- David Lindsay Bate, CBE, lately Chief Judge, Plateau State, Nigeria.
- Charles Peter Scott, CMG, OBE, lately HM Ambassador, Oslo.

Australian States

State of Western Australia

- Ernest Henry Lee-Steere, CBE, Lord Mayor of the City of Perth.

==== Commander of the Order of the British Empire (CBE) ====
Military Division

Royal Navy

- Patricia Gould, RRC, QHNS, Matron-in-Chief, Queen Alexandra's Royal Naval Nursing Service.
- Captain Thomas George Frederick Hardy.
- Captain William Hawley, OBE.
- Captain Geoffrey Charles Lloyd, ADC.
- Captain James Waddon Martyn Pertwee.

Army

- Brigadier The Lord Alvingham, OBE (368405), late Coldstream Guards.
- Colonel (Honorary Brigadier) Adrian Donaldson, DSO, MBE (228471), late Royal Regiment of Artillery (now R.A.R.O.).
- Colonel Geoffrey Loraine Dyce Duckworth (410854), late Royal Tank Regiment.
- Brigadier Eric Jim Hellier, OBE (391565), late Royal Corps of Signals.
- Colonel Henry O'Hara Logan, TD, ADC (417337), late Royal Regiment of Artillery, Territorial & Army Volunteer Reserve.
- Brigadier John Bleaden Ryall (371007), Royal Pioneer Corps.
- Brigadier Arthur Alexander Sisson, MBE (352717), late Royal Regiment of Artillery.
- Colonel Guy Stocker (268020), late 13th/18th Royal Hussars (Queen Mary's Own) (now R.A.R.O.).

Overseas Awards

- Colonel John Guy Frederick Head, MBE (360126), late Irish Guards.

Royal Air Force

- Air Commodore George Innes.
- Air Commodore Harold Edward White, DFC, AFC.
- Group Captain Ronald Gordon Ashford, MBE.
- Group Captain David Parry-Evans.
- Group Captain David Bruce Leech, OBE.

Civil Division

- Alec Field Atkin, OBE, managing director, Military Aircraft Division, British Aerospace (B.A.C. Ltd.). For services to Export.
- Derick Frank Banwell, General Manager, Runcorn Development Corporation.
- William Herbert Barnett, chairman, Belfast Harbour Commissioners.
- Jeffrey Stanway Blackburn, lately County Treasurer, Leicestershire County Council.
- Philip Hugh Bolshaw, chairman, Hertfordshire Social Services Committee.
- Zachry Brierley, MBE. For services to industry in Wales.
- Joseph Lawler Brown, TD, chairman, Birmingham Post & Mail Ltd.
- Austin Wyeth Bunch, MBE, deputy chairman, Electricity Council.
- Douglas Mason Campbell, QC, chairman, Medical Appeal Tribunal, Industrial Injuries Scheme, Scotland.
- Robin Francis Campbell, DSO, Art Director, Arts Council of Great Britain.
- Frederick Arthur Cholerton, Member, Stoke-on-Trent District and Staffordshire County Councils.
- Oswald William Hugh Clark, Vice-chairman, House of Laity, General Synod.
- Richard Charles Cobb, FBA, Professor of Modern History, University of Oxford.
- Sydney Cohen, Professor of Chemical Pathology, Guy's Hospital Medical School.
- Edward Domaille Collas, President, States of Guernsey Advisory and Finance Committee.
- George Venables Cooke, County Education Officer, Lincolnshire.
- Colin Stuart Cullimore, managing director, J. H. Dewhurst Ltd.
- William Davey, President, Portsmouth Polytechnic.
- Margaret Digby, OBE, Trustee, Horace Plunkett Foundation.
- Thomas Roy Earnshaw, OBE, Export Year Adviser, British Overseas Trade Advisory Council. For services to Export.
- Professor Eric Craig Easson, Director, Christie Hospital and Holt Radium Institute, Manchester.
- Betty Mabel Eyles, Assistant Secretary, Department of Trade.
- Professor William Ewart John Farvis, OBE. Lately Professor of Electrical Engineering, University of Edinburgh.
- Professor David John Finney, FRS, Director, Unit of Statistics, Agricultural Research Council.
- Ernest Martin Foulkes. For charitable services to medical and scientific research.
- Louis Freedman. For services to race relations.
- Anthony Freer Frodsham, chairman, Machine Tools Economic Development Committee.
- Robert Dickson Robertson Gardner, Secretary, Greater Glasgow Health Board.
- David Gilliland, Senior Assistant Secretary, Northern Ireland Office.
- Eric Eugene Leo Giuseppi, OBE, lately Senior Partner, Richards Butler & Co.
- Peter George Greenham, Keeper, Royal Academy Schools.
- Jasper Gibbons Grinling, Consultant, Grand Metropolitan Ltd. For services to food and drink industries.
- Geoffrey William Hamlyn, County Architect, Cheshire.
- Gladys Marea Hartman, MBE, Secretary, Women's Amateur Athletics Association.
- John Edward Hawkins, chairman, Greenwich and Bexley Area Health Authority.
- Eric Quinton Hazell, MBE, lately chairman, West Midlands Economic Planning Council.
- George Browne Heaney, chairman and managing director, General Motors Scotland Ltd., Motherwell. For services to Export.
- Samuel Hughes, lately Headmaster, Burnage High School, Manchester.
- Emanuel Henry Hurwitz. For services to Music.
- Arnold Harry Jennings, Headmaster, Ecclesfield School, Sheffield.
- Gwyn Owain Jones, lately Director, National Museum of Wales.
- James Mansfield Keith, TD. For services to the Corporation of London.
- Arthur William Kenny, Chief Scientific Officer, Department of the Environment.
- Arthur Lamb, lately chairman, Derbyshire Area Health Authority.
- Joan Cadogan Lancaster, Foreign and Commonwealth Office.
- John Harrop Lawton, lately Registrar of County Courts, Lord Chancellor's Department.
- Robert Smith Lennox. For services to local government in Aberdeen.
- Professor Kenneth Peters Liddelow, lately Dean of Dental Studies, King's College Hospital Dental School.
- Richard England Liddiard, chairman, Czarnikow Group Ltd.
- John Patrick Lowry, Director of Personnel and Administration, British Leyland.
- Professor Edward McCombie McGirr, Dean of Faculty of Medicine, University of Glasgow.
- Alexander McLean, MBE, lately Chief Constable, Ministry of Defence.
- Iain Alexander Macmillan, lately President, Law Society of Scotland.
- Kenneth Harold McNeill, Assistant Secretary, Civil Service Department.
- William Aitkenhead McNeill, Chairman of Governors, Ulster College.
- William Arthur Mallinson, managing director, Smiths Industries Ltd. For services to Export.
- George William Marriott, lately chairman, Steering Group of the Joint Government/Industry Footwear Industry Study.
- Frank Merrick. For services to music.
- Douglas Charles Milefanti, Assistant Secretary, Department of Transport.
- Laurence John Mills, board member, National Coal Board.
- Cathleen Nesbitt (Cathleen Mary Ramage), Actress.
- Horace Roy Oakley, Senior Partner, J. D. & D. M. Watson.
- Professor Donald Cecil Pack, OBE. For services to Education in Scotland.
- Charles James Page, QPM, HM Inspector of Constabulary.
- Victor Grellier Paige, deputy chairman, National Freight Corporation.
- Constance Marie Patterson, OBE, National Officer, Transport and General Workers' Union.
- John Bradley Pearson, lately chairman, Dudley Area Health Authority.
- William Ross Pinkerton, chairman, Western Heath and Social Services Board.
- John Godolphin Quicke. For services to agriculture.
- Peter Rainger, assistant director of Engineering, British Broadcasting Corporation.
- William Edward Randall, DFC, AFC, deputy chairman and managing director, Chubb & Son Ltd. For services to Export.
- Robert Duncan Rawson, MBE, Senior Principal Inspector of Taxes, Board of Inland Revenue.
- William Linford Llewelyn Rees, Professor of Psychiatry, St. Bartholomew's Hospital Medical College.
- Jean Rhys (Ella Gwendoline Hamer), Writer.
- Geoffrey Frank Ingleson Roberts, Member for Production and Supply, British Gas Corporation.
- Lewis Edward John Roberts, Director, Atomic Energy Research Establishment, Harwell, United Kingdom Atomic Energy Authority.
- Professor Noel Farnie Robertson, Principal, East of Scotland College of Agriculture.
- Arthur Geoffrey Robinson, managing director, Tees and Hartlepool Port Authority.
- Derek Samuel Salberg, OBE. For services to the Alexandra Theatre, Birmingham.
- Edward Alfred Sedgley, lately Assistant Secretary, Home Office.
- Alfred Spinks, FRS, Research Director, Imperial Chemical Industries Ltd.
- Jack Allan Springett, Chief Education Officer, County of Essex.
- Claude Stanfield. For services to local government in Mid Glamorgan.
- Kenneth Arthur Steer, Secretary, Royal Commission on the Ancient and Historical Monuments of Scotland.
- Thomas Stoppard, Playwright.
- Charles Norman Thompson, President, Royal Institute of Chemistry.
- Donald Tyerman. For services to The Save the Children Fund.
- Olga Uvarov. For services to the veterinary profession.
- Kenneth Robert Vernon, deputy chairman and Chief Executive, North of Scotland Hydro-Electric Board.
- Lewis Edgar Waddilove, OBE, Director, Joseph Rowntree Memorial Trust.
- James Clive Walker, lately managing director, Molins Ltd. For services to Export.
- William Ferguson Watson, Group Technical Director, Allied Polymer Group Ltd.
- Roy Watts, Director, Commercial Operations, British Airways.
- Thomas Rowland Watts, Partner, Price Waterhouse & Co.
- Jessie Margaret White, Member, Leeds City Council.
- Derek Edward Wilde, Vice Chairman, Barclays Bank Ltd., chairman, Keyser Ullman Holdings Ltd.
- Eluned Woodford-Williams, Director, Health Advisory Service, Department of Health and Social Security.
- Robert Wilson, FRS, Perren Professor of Astronomy, University of London.
- Charles Vere Wintour, MBE. For services to Journalism.
- Jack Wolkind, Chief Executive, London Borough of Tower Hamlets.
- Joseph Neville Wood, Director General, General Council of British Shipping.
- Leonard George Wood, Group Director, Music, EMI Ltd. For services to Export.
- John Wright, chairman and managing director, Hall, Russell & Company Ltd.

Diplomatic Service and Overseas List

- Richard Mossop Auty, OBE, British Council Representative, France.
- James Alexander Burgess, OBE, lately Chief Secretary, New Hebrides Condominium. (Deceased).
- James William Coulson. For services to British commercial interests in Australia.
- David Michael Dent-Young. For services to British commercial interests and the British community in Nigeria.
- Phillip Martin Edmonds. For services to education and the British community in Pakistan.
- Elsie Elliott. For public services in Hong Kong.
- Ralph Erskine. For services to architecture.
- Fitzroy Nymphias Eustace. For public and community services in St. Vincent.
- Cecil Desmond Fears. For services to British commercial interests and the British community in Kuwait.
- Leo Rene Fernig, lately Director, International Education Bureau, UNESCO, Geneva.
- Richard Masters Gorham, DFC. For public services in Bermuda.
- Desmond Hayward Hill, OBE. For services to university education in Nigeria.
- Dorothea Agnes King, OBE. For public services in Bermuda.
- David Francis Battye Le Breton, H.M. Commissioner, Anguilla.
- John Hepburn Myrtle. For services to British commercial interests in Australia.
- Leslie Reid, H.M. Consul-General, Cleveland.
- Stanley John Robins, OBE. For services to British commercial interests in Belgium.
- Guy Mowbray Sayer. For public and community services in Hong Kong.
- Aubyn Pinckney Simpson. For services to the British community in Argentina.
- Robert McAulay Stratton. For services to British commercial interests in Australia.

Australian States

State of New South Wales

- Professor Peter Thomas Fink, Professor of Mechanical Engineering, University of New South Wales.
- Professor James Waldo Lance, Professor of Neurology, University of New South Wales.

State of Victoria

- Professor Maurice Rossie Ewing, Professor of Surgery, University of Melbourne.
- Alfred Leyster Tisdall, of Black Rock. Lately chairman, State Rivers and Water Supply Commission of Victoria.

State of Queensland

- David Thomas Buchanan, of Brookfield. For services to mining.
- Roderick John Charles O'Loan, MBE, of Hamilton. For services to the community.

State of Western Australia

- Harold Robert Elphick, of Shenton Park. For services to medicine and the community.

==== Officer of the Order of the British Empire (OBE) ====
Military Division

Royal Navy

- Commander John Edwin Charles Allen.
- Commander William Lawrence Hart.
- Acting Captain David Lloyd Griffith James.
- Chief Officer Hilary Mary de Beauvoir Jeayes, Women's Royal Naval Service.
- Lieutenant Commander Bruce Edwin Nicolls.
- Commander John Jenkyn Parry.
- Commander Kenneth George Paul.
- Commander Patrick Leslie Ramsden, VRD, Royal Naval Reserve.
- Major Robert Jeremy Ross, Royal Marines.
- Commander Charles William Shears.
- Commander Antony James Richard Smith.
- Surgeon Commander Ronald Edward Snow, MVO.
- Lieutenant Colonel Keith Nigel Wilkins, Royal Marines.

Army

- Lieutenant Colonel Stuart Trevor Willcocks Anderson, MC (453432), The Queen's Regiment.
- Lieutenant Colonel Norman Edmund Collins Bamford, TD (432596), Royal Army Medical Corps, Territorial & Army Volunteers Reserve.
- Lieutenant Colonel (Staff Quartermaster) Eric Charles John Bull, MM (449654), The Royal Irish Rangers (27th (Inniskilling) 83rd & 87th).
- Lieutenant Colonel Leslie William Colebrook (373618), Royal Regiment of Artillery (now R.A.R.O.).
- Lieutenant Colonel Peter Robin Duchesne (451229), Royal Regiment of Artillery.
- Lieutenant Colonel (Acting) Timothy Elford (414263), Combined Cadet Force, Territorial & Army Volunteer Reserve.
- Lieutenant Colonel (Quartermaster) Albert William Hallows (478529), Royal Corps of Transport.
- Lieutenant Colonel (Local Colonel) Brian Musson Lees (434899), The Light Infantry.
- Lieutenant Colonel Giles Hugh Le Maitre (443496), The Black Watch (Royal Highland Regiment).
- Lieutenant Colonel Joseph Hubbard Milburn, MBE (433192), The King's Own Royal Border Regiment.
- Lieutenant Colonel Keith Rowland Morgan-Jones (457987), Royal Army Veterinary Corps.
- Lieutenant Colonel Peter Raymond Ralph, AFC (409419), Army Air Corps.
- Lieutenant Colonel Antony Gibson Rawlins (414311), Corps of Royal Engineers.
- Lieutenant Colonel Roger Squires, TD (431479), Royal Regiment of Artillery, Territorial & Army Volunteer Reserve.
- Lieutenant Colonel (now Acting Colonel) John James Stibbon (437174), Corps of Royal Engineers.
- Lieutenant Colonel Roderick Muir Bamford Walker, MC (420946), Intelligence Corps.
- Lieutenant Colonel (Local Colonel) Kenneth Herbert McKenzie Young (486184), Royal Army Medical Corps.

Overseas Awards

- Lieutenant Colonel Cragin Croyle Curtis, ED, Bermuda Regiment.

Royal Air Force

- Wing Commander Francis Gordon Agnew, AFC (164965).
- Wing Commander Cedric Arthur Bishop (577636).
- Wing Commander Gordon Bryan (578976).
- Wing Commander Richard Green (607392).
- Wing Commander Robert George Halverson (0312978), Royal Australian Air Force.
- Wing Commander William Sinclair Ireland (2265170).
- Wing Commander Richard Edward Johns, MVO (607934).
- Wing Commander Francis McClory (3133411).
- Wing Commander Harold Marshall, DFC (3122668).
- Wing Commander Robert Lawrence Reid (5055925).
- Wing Commander Rex Southern Sanders, DFC, AFC (135043).
- Wing Commander Jack Webb (191106).
- Wing Commander John Alan Williams, MBE (607058).

Civil Division

- Kenneth George Addison, Chairman, Hearing Aid Council.
- Reginald Herbert Alderson, AEA, Vice-chairman, Hampshire County Council.
- Colin Alexander John Anderson, Chairman, Local Enterprise Development Unit.
- James Reginald Archer, Chairman, Trustee Savings Bank of Yorkshire and Lincoln.
- Sarah Alice Armstrong, lately Principal Nursing Officer, Southern Area Special Care Service, Northern Ireland.
- James Ashwood, Principal, Department of Trade.
- Arthur Thomas Aust, Senior Principal Scientific Officer, Ministry of Defence.
- Stanley Baddeley, Area Treasurer, Gloucestershire Area Health Authority.
- Walter Baharie, QPM, Deputy Chief Constable, Northumbria Police.
- Frank Baker, lately Public Relations Officer, London Transport Executive.
- Richard St. Barbe Baker, Forestry Adviser. Founder, Men of the Trees.
- John Baldwin, General Secretary, Amalgamated Union of Engineering Workers (Construction Section); Member, Engineering Construction, Economic Development Committee.
- Ronald William George Barker, Entertainer.
- Ella May Barnes, Principal Scientific Officer, Food Research Institute, Norwich.
- Vernon Barnsley, Principal, Department of Energy.
- Robert Barr, Chairman and Managing Director, A. G. Barr & Co. Ltd. For services to the food industry.
- Norman Barry, lately Divisional Nursing Officer, Kensington, Chelsea and Westminster Area Health Authority.
- William Dryden Bell, Chairman of the Governors, Northern Counties School for the Deaf, Newcastle upon Tyne.
- Leonard Charles Bennett, Director of Housing, Greater London Council.
- Phillip Bennett. For services to Rugby Football.
- Henry George Bennison, Managing Director, Air-Log Ltd.
- Frank Berry, Chairman, Executive Committee, United Kingdom Pilots' Association.
- Cecil Harry Bourchier, Chief Information Officer, Central Office of Information.
- John Brooke Boyd, Head of Trade Affairs Department, Imperial Chemical Industries Ltd.
- Maurice Bernard Bradshaw. For services to Art.
- John Michael Brearley. For services to Cricket.
- Ian Donald Sheerman Brown, MC, Principal, Department of Trade.
- George Gordon Browning, Medical Consultant, Scottish Branch, British Red Cross Society.
- Douglas Jeffrey Bruce, Chief Fire Officer, Cleveland Fire Brigade.
- Ethel Ayton Buglass, Principal, Scottish Office.
- Henry Anthony Howard Burgess. For services to the Scout Association in Hertfordshire.
- Mary Elizabeth Burkett, Director, Abbot Hall Art Gallery.
- Cecil Burns, General Medical Practitioner, Ballymoney Health Centre, County Antrim.
- Alan Bursey, Regional Quantity Surveyor, West Midlands Regional Health Authority.
- John Hamilton Bustard, Deputy General Manager, Shipping and International Services Division, British Railways Board.
- James Carr, Director and Producer, World Wide Pictures Ltd.
- Walter William Cashmore, Commissioner, West Midlands Area, St. John Ambulance Brigade.
- Charles Reginald Chadwick, County Surveyor and Director of Highways and Transportation, Wiltshire County Council.
- Gerald Arthur Champniss, MBE, Inspector, Airside Safety and Operations, British Airports Authority.
- Frederick John Chate, Director of Operations, Shell U.K. Exploration & Production Ltd.
- Fraser Murray Cook, Managing Director, B.P. (Oil) Grangemouth Refinery Ltd.
- Francis Frederick Coombes, Education Welfare Officer, Avon County Council.
- Ronald Balfour Corbett, Entertainer.
- France Laura Ada Emeline Fiona Cornish, Principal, Springfield School, Bristol.
- Rupert John Cyster, Farmer, East Sussex.
- Christopher Vigor Tomkins Dadd, Agricultural Director, National Agricultural Centre, Royal Agricultural Society of England.
- Walter George Daw, Member, Exeter City Council.
- Frank Stanley Dearman, Managing Director, Northern Divers Ltd.
- Robert Arnold Dilworth, Superintending Engineer, Home Office.
- Kenneth William Bell Domony, Personnel Director, British Transport Docks Board.
- Joseph Kenneth Douglas. For charitable services to medical research.
- John David Drake, lately Senior Principal, Department of Employment.
- Victor William Michael Drury, General Medical Practitioner, Bromsgrove.
- Philip Dunleavy. For services to local government in South Glamorgan.
- Gordon John Felix Dupree, Chairman, Berkshire Savings Committee.
- William Rowland Earp, County Secretary, Essex Branch, Soldiers' Sailors' & Airmen's Families Association.
- Maurice Henry Easy, Director, Decca Radar Ltd.
- Henry Kenneth Edwards, Senior Principal, Department of Transport.
- Lewis Charles Edwards. For services to youth in Liverpool.
- Frederick Rowland Emett, Artist and Inventor.
- John Edwin England, Superintending Mechanical and Electrical Engineer, Department of the Environment.
- Ainslie Howard Ensor. For services to the National Association of Boys' Clubs in Buckinghamshire.
- John Dennis Evans, lately Headmaster, Abbotsfield Comprehensive School, Hillingdon.
- Kathleen Evans. For services to the community in Penarth.
- Frank Taylor Farmer, Professor of Medical Physics, University of Newcastle upon Tyne.
- Derek Lionel Farrant, Director, Council of Ironfoundry Associations.
- Leslie Harry Finedon, Group Director, Remploy Ltd.
- Joan Mary Francis, HM Inspector of Schools, Department of Education & Science.
- Joan Ailie Frankland, Head Teacher, Maidenhall Infant School, Luton.
- Hugh Fraser, Technical Adviser, Ministry of Defence.
- Walter Molineux Freegard, Deputy Headmaster, Fleetham Primary School, Middlesbrough.
- Francis Boyd Gage, DL, Member, Police Authority for Northern Ireland.
- Roland Kitto Coleman Giddings, MC, Secretary General, British Bankers' Association.
- William Harold Gilliland. For services to agriculture in Northern Ireland.
- Rowland William James Godden, Director, The Clothing Institute.
- George Bernard Francis Goff, Technical Director, Cathodeon Ltd.
- Maurice Goldstein. For services to Table Tennis.
- Alan Goodson, QPM, Chief Constable, Leicestershire Constabulary.
- Iris Patricia Greening, Area Nursing Officer, Birmingham Area Health Authority.
- Alan Benjamin Hadaway, Assistant Director, Centre for Overseas Pest Research, Ministry of Overseas Development.
- Harold George Hamey, Senior Inspector of Taxes, Board of Inland Revenue.
- Jack Bernard Harris, Principal Professional and Technology Officer, Property Services Agency, Department of the Environment.
- Philip Harry Hartley. For local government services in the London Borough of Brent.
- Malcolm Smith Harvey, District Community Physician, Canterbury and Thanet, Kent Area Health Authority.
- William Henry Helme, Senior Farm Management Advisory Officer, Ministry of Agriculture, Fisheries & Food.
- Wing Commander John Wilfred Hemley, Wing Representative Chairman, Hertfordshire Wing, Air Training Corps.
- Maude Rhys Henderson, lately National Adviser, Pre-school Playgroups Association.
- Clare Jean Henry, lately Registrar, University of London Institute of Education.
- Aubrey Herbert, lately Member, West Suffolk County Council.
- Lancelot John Heron, Chairman, National Insurance Local Tribunal, Durham Area.
- James Hislop, Headteacher, Kilmarnock Academy.
- Lewis Henry William Hobday. For services to ex-Servicemen.
- Paul Hodgson, Under Secretary, Association of Metropolitan Authorities.
- Walter William Robert Holland, Secretary, British Amateur Weight Lifters' Association.
- Mary Jane Holmes. For services to local government and to the community in Northern Ireland.
- Thomas Were Howard, Chairman, Finance Committee, British Standards Institution.
- Robert Alexander Innes, Conservator, North Scotland Conservancy, Forestry Commission (Scotland).
- Eric George Irons. For services to community relations in Nottingham.
- Francis Alan Jackson, Master of the Music, York Minster.
- Ronald Clement Jenking, lately Director of Finance, North West Water Authority.
- Mari Hilda Catherine Christopher Jenkins. For services to the Parkinson's Disease Society.
- Alfred Jones, QFSM, Firemaster, Tayside Fire Brigade.
- David Hubert Jones, General Medical Practitioner, Port Talbot.
- Philip Stuart Jones, Controller of Light Entertainment, Thames Television Ltd.
- Thomas Jones. For public services in Gwynedd.
- Thomas Cyprian Jupp, Director, National Centre for Industrial Language Training.
- John Otto Kiddle, Senior Legal Assistant, Department of Health and Social Security.
- Colin Frederick Kidman, Chairman, Kidman & Sons Ltd, Cambridge.
- Samuel Thomas Killen, Clerk of the Petty Sessions, Belfast.
- Ian Stanley Scott-Kilvert, lately Director, Literature Department, The British Council.
- Alison Elsie King, Director, Office Premises and Co-ordinator, Properties, Women's Royal Voluntary Service.
- Fay Rose Kramrisch, Senior Mistress, Fairfax Upper School, Bradford.
- Wing Commander Gerald Arthur Lane, DFC, Secretary, Highlands of Scotland Territorial & Army Volunteer Reserve Association.
- Professor Bryan Wooleston Langlands. For services to higher education overseas.
- Henry Ryder Wilkinson Latham, Foreign and Commonwealth Office.
- David Edward Lea, Head, Economic Department, Trades Union Congress.
- Knyvett Romer-Lee, lately Adviser, to chairman, International Wrought Copper Council.
- William Rufus Lee, lately Deputy Chief Inspector, Inner London Education Authority.
- John Richard Lill, Pianist.
- Edward Loveless, Project Design Manager, British Aerospace (British Aircraft Corporation).
- John Graham Maccoy, Joint Managing Director, Anderson Hughes & Co. Ltd.
- Thomas Pirrie McIntyre. For services to local government in Cumnock and Doon Valley.
- Peter McKenzie, Consultant Physician in Charge, Department of Infectious Diseases, Belvidere Hospital, Glasgow.
- Thomas Mackenzie, MM, Chairman, Social Work Committee, Highland Regional Council.
- John Walford McLean. For services to dental research.
- Robert Maclean, Manufacturing Director, Polaroid (U.K.) Ltd., Vale of Leven. For services to export.
- William Gordon McNay, Chief Executive, East Kilbride District Council.
- Arthur Thomas Mahy, lately Secretary to the Bailiff of Guernsey.
- Kathleen Makower. For services to the National Association of Youth Clubs.
- John Keith Mason, lately Industrial Correspondent, The Sun.
- James Campbell Gibson Mercer, Chief Administrative Medical Officer, Fife Health Board.
- Graeme Molyneux Metcalf. For services to industrial development in Wales.
- Bernard Douglas Monks, Product Planning Manager, Western Division, British Airways.
- Kenneth Morgan, lately General Secretary, National Union of Journalists.
- John Vernon Morris, Senior Principal Scientific Officer, Ministry of Defence.
- Major William John Morris, MBE, ERD, Chairman, Wales Savings Committee.
- John Morrison, QPM, lately Deputy Assistant Commissioner, Metropolitan Police.
- Robert Fraser Murison, QPM, DL, Chief Constable, Fife Constabulary.
- Robert Murray, Occupational Health Consultant.
- Sylvia Strangways Neale, lately Director, Buckinghamshire Branch, British Red Cross Society.
- George Peadon Newton, Director of Social Services, Wiltshire County Council.
- Sean O'Dwyer, Financial Director, Desmond & Sons Ltd.
- Dennis Stewart Paravicini, General Manager, Minting Division, Thomas De La Rue & Co. Ltd.
- Alfred Ernest Pegler. For services to local government, and particularly to housing in Crawley New Town.
- Robert Perkins, Managing Director, Ransomes & Rapier Ltd. For services to Export.
- Gordon James Piller. For services to the Leukaemia Research Fund.
- Antony Russell Pippard, Technical Director, Photo Technology Ltd.
- George Frederick Leighton Potter, lately Managing Director, Southern Publishing Co. Ltd.
- Clifford Henry Purkis, Director, Watson House, British Gas Corporation.
- Magnus Alfred Pyke, lately Secretary, British Association for the Advancement of Science.
- Phillip Oliver Reece, Deputy Chairman and Chief Operating Officer, Atlantic Division, Hydro-Air International Ltd.
- Hedley Brownrigg Reid, Secretary, Fire Authority for Northern Ireland.
- Professor Frederick Fernand Ridley, Chairman, Job Creation Programme, Merseyside.
- John Davie Manson Robertson, Chairman, Highlands & Islands Regional Savings Committee and Orkney District Savings Committee.
- Toby Robertson (Sholto David Maurice Robertson), Director, Prospect Theatre Company.
- Captain John Edward Robson, RD, VRD. For services to the Sea Cadet Corps in Northern Ireland.
- Wulstan Reginald Ernest Rowland, Regional Supplies Officer, North East Thames Regional Health Authority.
- Joseph George Rowley, Member, Dudley Metropolitan Borough Council.
- Stanley Rundle, Member, Richmond upon Thames Borough Council.
- William Thomas Joseph Rutter, Chief Probation Officer, Gloucestershire Probation and After-Care Service.
- John Gordon Ryder, Architect, Ryder and Yates & Partners.
- Arthur James Sage, ED, Chairman, Southern Regional Council for Sport and Recreation.
- Joyce Saunders, Chairman, Women's Solid Fuel Council.
- Humphrey Albert Sayce, lately Headmaster, Llanrumney High School, Cardiff.
- David Patrick Schwarz. For services to local government in Clwyd.
- Leslie Elon Sidney Seeney, Director General, National Chamber of Trade.
- Stanley Solomon Segal. For services to the education of disabled children.
- Saleem Shahed, Producer, Birmingham, British Broadcasting Corporation.
- William Irvine Shaw, lately Controller, Investigation Division, Post Office.
- Harold Herbert Shelton, lately Assistant Director, Middlesex Polytechnic.
- Mary Margaret Sibthorp, Director, David Davies Memorial Institute of International Studies.
- Dorothy Betty Smith, lately Headmistress, St. Katharine's Church of England Secondary School, Haringey.
- George Howard Smith. For public service in Halifax.
- Jack Solomons, Managing Director, World Sporting Club, for charitable services.
- David Stewart Soutar, lately Head, Scottish Farm Buildings Investigation Unit, Aberdeen.
- Mona Stamp, District Nursing Officer, Devon Area Health Authority.
- Raymond Cansfield Stanger. For services to the Magistracy in the North East.
- Sheila Betty Stewart, Member, Board of Visitors, HM Prison Canterbury; lately Member, East Sutton Park Borstal.
- Leslie Alfred John Stribley, Principal, Board of Customs and Excise.
- Cyril Nott Taylor, Director, Sheffield Engineering Employers Association.
- Emyr Prichard Thomas, lately Clerk to the Justices, Caernarfon.
- Joseph Thomson, Managing Director, Allen Bradley Electronics Ltd. For services to Export.
- Henry James Thubron. For services to art education.
- William Wadkin, Assistant Managing Director, Nuclear Power Co. Ltd.
- John Wakefield, Director, Department of Social Research, Christie Hospital and Holt Radium Institute, Manchester.
- Derrick Walker, Member, Rochdale Borough Council.
- The Reverend Horace Walker, lately Secretary, Home Board, Church of Scotland.
- Thomas Neville Watkins, Chief Fire Officer, Derbyshire Fire Brigade.
- James William Watts, Head of Legal Department, National Union of Agricultural and Allied Workers.
- Edward Alban Webb, Deputy General Secretary, Post Office Engineering Union.
- Charles William Whiteley, Managing Director, B.S. & W. Whiteley Ltd. For services to Export.
- Duncan Richard Primrose Wilkie, Senior Medical Officer, Department of Health & Social Security.
- The Reverend George Davidson Wilkie, Organiser, Church and Industry, Home Board, Church of Scotland.
- Dorian Joseph George Williams, Chairman, British Horse Society.
- David Eames Wilson, Sales Director, Vosper Thornycroft (U.K.) Ltd. For services to Export.
- Reginald Denis Wilson. For services to the Royal British Legion.
- Frank Max Wiseman, Chairman, M. Wiseman & Co. Ltd.
- Edward Albert Arthur Woodward, Actor.
- John Henry Bowstead Workman, Adviser on Conservation and Woodlands, The National Trust.
- George Worsley, lately Secretary, Headquarters Branch, International Law Association.
- Joseph Wright, Secretary and Director, National Pharmaceutical Association.
- Morris Francis Zimmerman, Director, National Association of Master Bakers, Confectioners and Caterers. For services to the baking industry.

Diplomatic Service and Overseas List

- Alfred Richard Allen. For services to education in Nigeria.
- Norman Edward Andrews. For services to the British community in Guatemala.
- Peter Alaric John Arengo-Jones, Information Officer, HM Embassy, Berne.
- Gordon Grant Benton. For services to the British community in Jakarta.
- Terence Kelsey Blackman, lately First Secretary (Commercial) HM Embassy, Rangoon.
- Margaret Kitchen Bruce, lately deputy director, Human Rights Division, United Nations, New York.
- Siu-leun Cham, MBE. For services to the community in Hong Kong.
- James Charles Churcher. For medical and welfare services to the community in Israel.
- Henry James Corker, MBE. For public services in St. Helena.
- Ronald Hugh Kennedy Crichton. For services to British commercial interests in Tokyo.
- Teresa Marie Cullis, First Secretary and Consul, HM Embassy, Brussels.
- The Right Reverend Jack Cunningham, lately Bishop of Central Zambia.
- Lydia Dunn. For public services in Hong Kong.
- Robert Charles Edmonds. For services to British commercial interests and the British community in Japan.
- Cyril Vincent Eyre. For services to the development of agriculture in The Gambia.
- David Neville Griffiths Farquharson, TD. For services to British commercial interests and the British community in New York.
- James Ralph Dalzell Foster. For services to British commercial interests and the British community in Buenos Aires.
- Thomas Percy Gale. For services to British commercial interests in Venezuela.
- Gilbert Townley Gamble. For services to the British community in Malta.
- Barrie Charles Gane, First Secretary, H.Q. British Forces, Hong Kong.
- George Vincent Hall Gardner. For services to British commercial interests in Nigeria.
- Charles Joseph Gareze, Director of Labour & Social Security, Gibraltar.
- John Bonner Gillespie. For services to British commercial interests in Italy.
- George Clement Girard, Secretary of Finance, Ministry of Finance, St. Lucia.
- William John Gilbert Godwin. For services to the development of architecture in Nigeria.
- Christopher Thackeray Hatten. For services to British commercial interests in Madrid.
- Edgar Philip Gordon Hawkins, First Secretary, British High Commission, Nicosia.
- Sin-hang Ho, MBE. For services to the community in Hong Kong.
- David McCall Homan. For services to the British community in Kyrenia, Cyprus.
- The Reverend Brian William Horlock. For services to the Church and the British community in Oslo.
- The Reverend Canon John Elwyn Humphreys. For services to the British community in Estoril, Portugal.
- Arthur Sydney Towner Humphrys. For services to British commercial interests in Australia.
- Alma Hunt, MBE. For services to sport in Bermuda.
- Gillian Rhodes Hunt. For services to British cultural interests in Italy.
- Edward Hunter. For services to British commercial interests and the British community in Rio de Janeiro.
- John Richard Hamilton James. For services to British commercial interests and the British community in Muscat.
- Royston Jones. For services to university education in Kenya.
- Dermott Harrison Kydd. For services to agricultural development in Kenya.
- Thomas Henry Layng, HM Commissioner, Tuvalu.
- Kenneth Henry Lewis. For services to British commercial interests in Iran.
- Peter Henry John Lord, lately Engineer in Charge, Eastern Relay Station, Masirah.
- William Bennett MacGregor. For services to medicine overseas.
- Donald McLoughlin, lately Legal Adviser to the Governor of Pitcairn Island.
- Donald Malpas. For services to British commercial interests in Brazil.
- Stephen Roy Mendes. For public services in Antigua.
- James Turnbull Michie, Government Agent, Central District, Solomon Islands.
- James Mulholland, lately Representative, British Council, Sierra Leone.
- Joseph Smyth Mulholland. For services to agricultural development in the Solomon Islands.
- Hilson Archibald Wadsworth Denis Murdoch, Permanent Secretary, Civil Service, Antigua.
- Astor William Norrish. For services to the British community in Genoa.
- Basil Fretigny Pantin. For services to British commercial interests in South Africa.
- John Barrington Parkin, General Manager, Capital City Development Corporation, Malawi.
- Margaret Maud Partington, lately Principal Matron, Ministry of Health, Malawi.
- Michael Sydney Perry. For services to British commercial interests and the British community in Thailand.
- Andrew Michael Victor Robert Pringle. For services to British commercial interests and the British community in Paris.
- Anthony Theophilus Ribeiro, Permanent Secretary, Ministry of Education, Health & Social Affairs, St. Kitts-Nevis-Anguilla.
- Harold Theodore Rowlands, Financial Secretary, Falkland Islands.
- The Reverend John Rutherford. For services to education in Botswana.
- The Very Reverend Brian John Hector de Saram, lately Provost of All Saints' Cathedral, Cairo.
- John Andrew Schofield. For services to British commercial interests in Costa Rica.
- Eric Arthur Frederick Seaman, lately HM Consul British Consulate, Innsbruck, Austria.
- Roderick Gerald Sheridan, MVO, lately HM Consul, British Consulate, Algeciras, Spain.
- Roger Alasdair Silver. For services to British commercial interests and the British community in Venezuela.
- Roy Keetley Simmonds. For services to technical education in El Salvador.
- David Simpson. For services to Anglo-Ghanaian relations and the British community in Ghana.
- Douglas Maurice Ralph Skinner, lately First Secretary (Development), British High Commission, Lusaka.
- John Christian Stegler. For services to the community in the New Hebrides Condominium.
- Wilfred McBrien Swain, lately Economic Adviser, British Military Government, Berlin.
- William Denis Symington, lately HM Consul, British Consulate, Quebec.
- Christopher John Turner, Financial Secretary, British National Service, New Hebrides Condominium.
- Brian Vale, British Council Representative, Saudi Arabia.
- William Stuart Walker. For services to the community in the Cayman Islands.
- Kenneth Westcott, lately British Council Representative, Hong Kong.
- Gabrielle Oliver Whitehead. For services to the British community in the United States.
- David Sherbrooke Whitelegge, Commissioner for Census & Statistics, Hong Kong.
- Albert Franklyn Williams, Financial Secretary, Turks and Caicos Islands.
- Dora Innes Williamson. For services to the British community in the United States.
- Charles Herbert Withers-Payne. For services to the British community in Tanzania.

Australian States

State of New South Wales

- Warren David Adcock. For services to industry.
- John Anthony Bell. For services to the arts.
- William Bowmore. For services to the community.
- Emeritus Professor William Fraser Connell. For services to education.
- John Alexander Corner. For services to broadcasting and the community.
- Romola Costantino (Mrs. G. Enyi). For services to the arts.
- Harold Gerald Goldstein. For services to the community.
- Brother James Athanasius McGlade. For services to education.
- The Reverend Canon Melville Cooper Newth. For services to education and the church.
- Harold James Tapner. For services to sport.
- Lilian Charlotte Wells. For services to the church.
- Alice Patricia Wrightson. For services to literature.

State of Victoria

- Alfred Lewis Bennett, of Armadale. For public service.
- Roy Davison Birdsey, of Highton. For services to the community.
- Edward Eric Keith Bottomley, of Toorak. For services to medicine.
- Councillor Arthur John Leonard Wardale Greenwood, of Wangaratta. For municipal service.
- Emeritus Professor Norman Denholm Harper, Emeritus Professor of History, University of Melbourne.
- Roger Kemp, of Black Rock. For services to the arts.
- Kate Mackay, of Elsternwick. For services to medicine.
- Margaret Heath McPherson, of Glen Iris. For services to education.
- Mother Mary Teresa (Miss Agness Bojaxhiu) of Fitzroy. For services to humanity.

State of Queensland

- Peter Borgna, of via Tully. For services to the sugar industry and community.
- Gordon Alfred Chenery, of Bundaberg. For services to the sugar industry and the community.
- Beryl Dulcie Collett, of Kingaroy. For services to the community.
- Anthony Gordon English, of Chapel Hill. For services to the fruit and vegetable industry.
- John Ralph James, of Hamilton. For services to industry and commerce.
- Henry Sydney Williams, of Cairns. For services to commerce and the community in North Queensland.

State of Western Australia

- Glen Herford Dunstan, of Mount Lawley. For services to the Red Cross.
- Arthur Andrew Mills, of Beckenham. For services to the community.
- Evelyn Helena Parker, lately Mayor of Subiaco.

==== Member of the Order of the British Empire (MBE) ====
Military Division

Royal Navy

- Lieutenant Commander (SD) Gerald Basil Graham Beard.
- Warrant Officer 1 Brian John Stafford Bellas, Royal Marines, P014408S.
- Lieutenant Commander (SD) Bernard Allan Brantingham-Collins.
- First Officer Felicity-Anne Buchanan Browne, Women's Royal Naval Service.
- Lieutenant Commander Paul Jeremy Eustace Cooper.
- Lieutenant (SD) Berwyn Edwards.
- Lieutenant Commander Peter Macdonald Fulton, RD, Royal Naval Reserve.
- Lieutenant Commander Geoffrey Alexander Hales.
- Captain (SD) Tony Lewin, Royal Marines.
- Lieutenant (CS) Norman Henry Overington, Royal Marines.
- Lieutenant Commander (SD) Frederick Gordon Banfield Page.
- Fleet Chief Radio Supervisor David Anthony Peters, J905535W.
- Lieutenant Commander (SCC) John Giles Shilcock, Royal Naval Reserve.
- Lieutenant Commander (SD) Peter Slater Smeaton.
- Lieutenant Commander (SD) Peter Charles Whitlock.

Army

- Major (Director of Music) William Allen (481141), Royal Corps of Transport.
- Major (Quartermaster) Francis Joseph Alley (468848), The Royal Regiment of Fusiliers (now Retired).
- Major Maxwell James Allison (376055), Corps of Royal Engineers.
- 23915033 Warrant Officer Class 2 Michael Joseph Aylward, The Queen's Regiment.
- 22241220 Warrant Officer Class 2 Frederick Peter Bacon, Royal Corps of Signals, Territorial & Army Volunteer Reserve.
- Major Daniel Richard Baily (454974), The Royal Anglian Regiment.
- Major Graeme Edward Bartlett (473875), Royal Corps of Transport.
- 23202314 Warrant Officer Class 1 Jeffrey Alexander Beattie, The Queen's Own Hussars.
- Major (Queen's Gurkha Officer) Birkharaj Gurung (477053), 6th Queen Elizabeth's Own Gurkha Rifles.
- Captain (Quartermaster) Michael Francis Bohan (491111), Royal Corps of Transport.
- Major (Quartermaster) Bernard Campey (485613), The Prince of Wales's Own Regiment of Yorkshire.
- Major (now Acting Lieutenant Colonel) Reginald Carnell (483444), Royal Army Medical Corps.
- 23704752 Warrant Officer Class 2 Archibald Claydon, Royal Army Ordnance Corps.
- 23222588 Warrant Officer Class 1 Lionel Vivian Dicks, Army Air Corps.
- Major Michael Humfrey Dru Drury (473934), The Light Infantry.
- Major Peter Paul Glass (467087), Corps of Royal Electrical and Mechanical Engineers.
- Major (Quartermaster) Campbell Graham (484350), Scots Guards.
- Major (Quartermaster) James William Greaves (483033), The Life Guards.
- Captain Thomas Gordon Griffiths (494802), The Royal Welch Fusiliers, (now R.A.R.O.).
- Major (Director of Music) George Henry John Hurst (476189), Royal Army Medical Corps.
- Major Roger William Isaac (440412), The Royal Regiment of Wales (24th/41st Foot).
- Major Julian Charles Johnson (471585), Corps of Royal Electrical and Mechanical Engineers.
- Major John Hugh Kelly (365045), Royal Regiment of Artillery.
- Major Peter John Lloyd, TD (464955), Royal Regiment of Artillery, Territorial & Army Volunteer Reserve.
- Major Peter Jackson Matthews (451290), The Royal Regiment of Wales (24th/41st Foot).
- Lieutenant (Acting Captain) Robert Alexander McKay (504814), Royal Corps of Signals.
- 23515606 Warrant Officer Class 1 William Murphy, The Royal Irish Rangers (27th (Inniskilling) 83rd & 87th).
- Major William Forbes Nicholson (478896), The Parachute Regiment, Territorial & Army Volunteer Reserve.
- Major Hugh Beadnell Jeremy Phillips (453539), Royal Tank Regiment.
- Major Anthony David Pigott (477816), Corps of Royal Engineers.
- Major Hew William Royston Pike (472599), The Parachute Regiment
- 23175225 Warrant Officer Class 2 Thomas Edward Rumney, Royal Army Ordnance Corps.
- Captain (Quartermaster) Basil William Saunders, BEM (496994), The Royal Irish Rangers (27th (Inniskilling) 83rd & 87th).
- Major Roger John Smith (463075), The King's Own Royal Border Regiment.
- Captain Kenneth Standen (491891), Corps of Royal Electrical and Mechanical Engineers.
- Captain (Master at Arms) George Talkington (488222), Army Physical Training Corps.
- Major Edward Alan Taylor (435857), The Queen's Regiment.
- 22315357 Warrant Officer Class 2 Bernard Vincent, Royal Regiment of Artillery, Territorial & Army Volunteer Reserve.
- Major Christopher Brooke Quentin Wallace (472644), The Royal Green Jackets.
- Major (Staff Quartermaster) Richard Wallis (480507), Royal Army Ordnance Corps.
- Major (Acting) James Whyte (374556), Army Cadet Force, Territorial & Army Volunteer Reserve.
- Major (Acting) William Trevor Dominic Wood (428941), Army Cadet Force, Territorial & Army Volunteer Reserve.

Overseas Awards

- Major Joan Ellinor Blakeley (473453), Women's Royal Army Corps, lately attached to the Jamaica Defence Force.

Royal Air Force

- Squadron Leader James Hugh Walter Black (2620964).
- Squadron Leader David Leonard Blomley (608474).
- Squadron Leader Bryan Edwin Clark (593110).
- Squadron Leader Walter John Denman (683667).
- Squadron Leader Peter Desmond (1921674).
- Squadron Leader Thomas Francis Kean (609156).
- Squadron Leader James Richard Lees (586654).
- Squadron Leader Dennis Michael McKeown (4099725).
- Squadron Leader David John Rainford (508217).
- Squadron Leader Anthony John Raley (507078), for services with the Royal Brunei Malay Regiment.
- Squadron Leader Ivan Tom Rutter (2209375).
- Squadron Leader Geoffrey Croal White (181847).
- Acting Squadron Leader Henry Albert Cullen (204428), Royal Air Force Volunteer Reserve (Training Branch).
- Acting Squadron Leader John Lionel Mason (205656), Royal Air Force Volunteer Reserve (Training Branch).
- Flight Lieutenant John William Cobb (5200993), Royal Air Force Regiment.
- Flight Lieutenant Malcolm Jones (689368).
- Flight Lieutenant John Macmaster (1565215), (Retd).
- Flight Lieutenant George Peter Robb (578416).
- Flight Lieutenant Brian Howard Sparks (4232699).
- Warrant Officer Douglas Charles Allan (S4113946), Royal Air Force Regiment.
- Warrant Officer Edward Albert Bowers, BEM (K4084445).
- Warrant Officer Raymond Arthur Burns (G4018091).
- Warrant Officer Terrance David George Commins (S4029165).
- Warrant Officer Roy Cunningham (H4136197).
- Warrant Officer Denis Robert Grogan (H0584223).
- Warrant Officer Arthur Raymond Scott (R2273487).
- Warrant Officer Sidney Thacker Smith (Y0576696).
- Warrant Officer Howard Charles Richard Tuson (H1860233).
- Warrant Officer Ronald George Welbelove (D1921978).

Civil Division

- Charles Abbey. For services to the community in Rothwell, Leeds.
- William Christie Adamson, General Manager, Trustee Savings Bank of Tayside and Central Scotland.
- Christopher Adolphe, deputy chairman, East Midlands Gas Consumers' Council.
- Marion Aiston, Senior Nursing Officer (Midwifery), North Yorkshire Area Health Authority.
- Thomas Milne Aitchison, Chief Executive, Ross & Cromarty District Council.
- Gilbert Aitken, chairman, Rotherham Metropolitan District Savings Committee.
- Jack Lister Alsop, Senior Executive Officer, Department of Health and Social Security.
- Maude Phyllis Clark Anderson, Special Assistant Science Teacher, Inverness Royal Academy.
- Grace Douglas Andre. For services to the community in Sidlesham, Chichester.
- Robert Thomas Anthony, Head, East European Section, London Chamber of Commerce and Industry. For services to Export.
- John Charles Anzani. For services to local government in Mid Glamorgan.
- Muriel Joyce Arbus, lately Secretary, Narrow Fabrics Federation.
- Cecil Malcolm Arthur. For services to the Parliamentary Press Gallery.
- William Michael Allingham Ashton, chairman and musical director, National Youth Jazz Orchestra.
- Ivor Norman Atkinson, Professional and Technology Officer II, Department of the Environment for Northern Ireland.
- Frank Reginald Badger, Convener, General Electric Company Turbine Generators Ltd., Williams Works, Rugby.
- Clarrie Alice Bailey, Metropolitan District Organiser, Gateshead, Women's Royal Voluntary Service.
- Harry Barber, lately Member of Council, National Association of Local Councils.
- Mary Elizabeth Barling. For services to nature conservation in Worcester.
- Lawrence James Bartley, Project Manager, Tehran Project, London Electricity Board.
- Phyllis Margaret Barton. For services to the community in Earls Barton, Northampton.
- Mary Cicely Bateson. For services to the community in Oxford.
- Augustine Edwin Beare, Senior Technical Adviser to Development Group, County Architect's Department, Hertfordshire County Council.
- Emma Amelia Chester-Bell, Nursing Officer, St. Catherine's Hospital, Doncaster Area Health Authority.
- John Hiram Page Bement, Divisional Head Occupational Therapist, University Hospital of Wales, Cardiff.
- Harry Berkovi, Works Manager, British Aerospace, BAC (Guided Weapons). For services to Export.
- Rebecca Binder, Clerical Officer, Natural Environment Research Council.
- Elsie Irene Bishop, Examiner "D", Official Receiver's Office, Bristol.
- William Hugh Muir Black, Farm Manager, Scone Estates, Perthshire.
- Dorothea Elizabeth Blanchflower, Higher Executive Officer, Ministry of Agriculture, Fisheries & Food.
- Frederick Allan Bloomfield. For services to deaf people, particularly the young.
- Alexander Scott Bonthron, General Manager, North British Hotel, Edinburgh, British Transport Hotels Ltd.
- Reginald James Boothby, Traffic Officer (Special Duties), Eastern Counties Omnibus Company
- Joan Hope Dorman Bostock, Secretary, Association of Agriculture.
- John Gilbert Boulding, Chief Air Safety Investigator, British Airways.
- Mary Veronica Brett, Secretary, Women's Land Army Benevolent Fund.
- Frank Briggs, Headmaster, Morley Primary School, Morley, Derby.
- Norah Mary Broadbent. For services to the elderly in Wirral.
- Edward Frank Brock, Transport Manager, T. I. Weldless Ltd.
- Jack Brooker, Post Office Representative, South Eastern Regional Savings Committee.
- Albert Broomhead, Factory Manager, Sir Richard Arkwright & Co. (English Sewing Ltd.), Lisnaskea.
- Edward Brown, National Secretary, National Union of Seamen.
- Gladys Doreen Sinclair-Brown, Divisional Nursing Officer (Extended Care Division), Berkshire Area Health Authority.
- Captain Raymond Seaman Clement Brown, Secretary and Treasurer, The Foudroyant Trust.
- Corrie Agnes Browne, Nursing Officer, Weybridge Hospital, Surrey Area Health Authority.
- Sheila Evelyn Evans Buchanan, lately Foreign and Commonwealth Office.
- Nathaniel Howard Buglass, lately Secretary, Clay Pipe Development Association.
- Rachel Joan Bunting, Overseas Sales Director, Cambridge University Press. For services to Export.
- Stanley Victor Lewis Burton, Chief Hansard Assistant, House of Commons.
- Thomas Alexander Butler, Assistant to managing director, Portsmouth Aviation Ltd.
- Thomas William Byard, TD, chairman, Derby and District Local Joint Apprenticeship Committee for the Building Industry.
- John Charleson Calder, lately Journalist, Scottish Daily Record.
- Thomas Benjamin Carling, Member, Tayside Health Board.
- Christopher Clarence Carter, Journalist, The Bedfordshire Times.
- Jeanie Fleming Caskie. For services to the Darnley Hospital, Glasgow.
- Alfred Henry James Castle, Manager, Export Order Department, A. Gallenkamp & Co. Ltd. For services to Export.
- Robert Catstree, Chief Superintendent, Gwent Constabulary.
- Margaret Chappell, Deputy Head Teacher, Maltby Hall Infants School, Rotherham.
- Horace Brammer Clarke, Member, Lichfield District Council.
- Maurice Richard Cockrem, Senior Executive Officer, Lord Chancellor's Department.
- Denis James Bond Cockshutt, Member, Elmbridge Borough Council.
- Jean Cole, lately Shorthand Typist, Board of Inland Revenue.
- Thomas Collinson, lately Head, Assessment Centre, Kingswood Schools, Bristol.
- Lilian Helen Margaret Collyer, Director of Nursing Education, St. Bartholomew's School of Nursing, City and East London Area Health Authority.
- David Cook, Headteacher, Balbardie Primary School, Bathgate.
- Edmund Cook, lately Senior Executive Officer, Department of Transport.
- William Victor Cooper. For services to the community in Torbay.
- Arthur Spiers Coulthard, Commercial Director, Aluminium Ingot Foundry, B.K.L. Alloys Ltd. For services to Export.
- Leonard Cowing, Professional and Technology Officer Grade I, Ministry of Defence.
- Thomas Albert Crook, Supply Officer, Courtaulds Ltd.
- Barbara Rose Crowe, Member, Southend Society for Mentally Handicapped Children.
- Winifred Cubie. For services to mentally disabled people in the North Tyneside area.
- Ruth Darvill, Supervisor, Civic Information Service, Sheffield City Council.
- Brynley Davies. For services to Agriculture in South Wales.
- David Ivor Davies, lately Secretary, Bridgend General Hospital.
- Edwin John Davies, Member, Sedgemoor District Council.
- Myriel Irfona Davies, Regional Officer, London, United Nations Association.
- Althea Davis, President, North Islington Infant Welfare Clinic, Camden and Islington Area Health Authority.
- John William Davis, Headteacher, Woodside Junior School, Croydon.
- Leslie Frank Davis, lately Company Inspection and Quality Control Manager, Vandervell Products Ltd.
- John Sydney Dawswell, Chief Engineer, W. S. Atkins & Partners, Consulting Civil Engineers.
- Audrey Dora Deacon, Secretary, Hertfordshire Council for Voluntary Service.
- Albert Edward Wijetunge de Silva, lately Chief Cashier and Staff Manager, Dyson-Bell & Co., Parliamentary Agents.
- Eileen Devoto, Appeals Organiser, British Sailors' Society, Northern Ireland.
- George James Dingwall, chairman, Sutherland District Savings Committee.
- David Michael Dixon, Sales Manager, Britten Norman for Africa. For services to Exports.
- Joseph Peter Dixon, Senior Executive Officer, Department of Health and Social Security.
- Alexander Napier Douglas, Farmer and Partner in J. & A. Douglas Ltd, Land Drainage Contractors, Kent.
- Andrew Hutchison Duff, General Dental Practitioner, Galashields.
- Robert Duncan, Assistant District Engineer, Westminster Hospital, Kensington, Chelsea and Westminster Area Health Authority.
- Ian George Dunn, Regional Secretary, South West Region, General and Municipal Workers' Union.
- William Edgar, Superintendent, Royal Ulster Constabulary.
- Lucy Irene Edwards. For public service in Nottingham.
- Dennis Ellam, Secretary, National Federation of Wholesale Grocers and Provision Merchants.
- Katharine Mary Elliot. For services to the League of Friends, Royal Marsden Hospital.
- Fred Ellis, Director of Nurse Education, Dundee College of Nursing & Midwifery.
- Dennis Edwin Evans, chairman, Liverpool Savings Committee.
- Patricia Olive Evans, assistant director, International Institute for Strategic Studies.
- Frederick Maitland Eves, chairman, Visiting Committee, Millisle Borstal, County Down.
- Edward Ernest Joseph Fairhall, Contracts Coordinator, Worthington-Simpson Ltd., Newark.
- Peter Alec Fairley, lately Inspector, Metropolitan Police.
- Jeffrey Farnell, Local Officer I, Department of Health & Social Security.
- Ronald Ernest Farren, Trustee and Secretary, Nene Foundation.
- Roy Alfred Field, Director, Hobson & Sons (London) Ltd.
- John Ernest Final, Administration Manager, Hatfield, British Aerospace (H.S.D.).
- Christina Flach, Ward Sister, Coppetts Wood Hospital, Camden and Islington Area Health Authority.
- Daniel James Foley, Executive Officer, Tilbury Docks, National Dock Labour Board.
- James Rillie Ford, chairman, Berwickshire District Council.
- Robert Cecil Fordham, Local Officer I, Department of Health & Social Security.
- Alfred Fox, Treasurer, Stratford-on-Avon District Council.
- Eliza Selina Franklin. For services to the Girls' Friendly Society.
- Arthur Paul Fuller, Clerical Officer, Department of Health & Social Security.
- Percy William Gayler, lately Chief Clerk, Slough County Court.
- George Harrison Gibson, lately Manager, Hartford/ Moss Farm Recreation Centre, Cheshire County Council.
- Margaret Victorina Forshaw Gilchrist, Secretary, Pensions Appeal Tribunals for Scotland.
- Francis Goodall, Manager/Works Engineer, Wolverhampton Repair Centre, Midlands, British Road Services Ltd.
- Douglas Richard Geoffry Goodchild. For services to Association Football particularly in Berkshire and Buckinghamshire.
- Arthur Joseph Gooding, Higher Executive Officer, Board of Inland Revenue.
- Christopher Frederick Goodwin, Office Manager, Bensley & Co. Ltd.
- Leslie Albert Gosden, Site Agent, Farnborough, Society of British Aerospace Companies Ltd. For services to Export.
- Major Alan Ellis Graham, Executive Officer, East Midland Territorial & Army Volunteer Reserve Association.
- Harold William Greatrex, MM, Member, South Eastern Gas Consumers' Council.
- Elsie Elizabeth Saintoin Green. For services to the Polesden Lacy Open Air Theatre and to Horton Hospital, Epsom.
- Stanley Wilson Grice, Headteacher, Kirbymoorside County Primary School.
- Robert William Griffiths, Head Forester, Forestry Commission (Wales).
- Sylvia Gladys Hale, Senior Personal Secretary, Board of Inland Revenue.
- Ian Hallam. For services to Cycling.
- William Halligan. For services to the National Association of Boys' Clubs in Yorkshire.
- John Hamilton, Senior Executive Officer, Department for National Savings.
- Alice Harriet Hand. For services to the Weibeck Nursery School, Byker, Newcastle upon Tyne.
- William Mason Creer Hargreaves, Head of Recreational Services Department, The Spastics Society.
- Frank Harris, Assistant Chief Fire Officer, Essex Fire Brigade.
- Frank Rowland Harrison, Senior Executive Officer, Department of Employment.
- McArthur Henry Hawkins, Foreign and Commonwealth Office.
- Charles Hay. For services to Curling in Scotland.
- George William Head, lately Headmaster, Thundercliffe Grange Hospital School.
- John Henderson, Secretary, Scottish Amateur Boxing Association.
- Thomas James Hicks, chairman, Cornwall Community Health Council.
- Bernard Hollings, Senior Executive Officer, Department for National Savings.
- John Richard Howard, Senior Executive Officer, Department of Health & Social Security.
- Vivienne Freda Hubbard, Senior Personal Secretary, Home Office.
- Evelyn Vera Russell-Hughes, Nursing Adviser, Clwyd Branch, British Red Cross Society.
- Joseph Henry John Hughes. For services to disabled people in Northern Ireland.
- Bernard John Hunt. For services to Golf.
- Renee Redfern Hunt, Administrative Officer (Examinations), Institution of Civil Engineers.
- Ramon Hurst, Principal Careers Officer, County of Cleveland.
- John Herbert Hutchinson, Superintendent, Royal Ulster Constabulary.
- Betty Eileen Stavert Irving, Chief Superintendent of Typists, HM Treasury.
- Thomas Bruce Jackson, National Sales Manager, Commercial Division, Honeywell Ltd.
- Edward James Jeffrey, lately Manager, Supplies Computer Services Branch, Navy, Army and Air Force Institutes.
- Frank Jenkins, District Librarian, Middlesbrough Branch, Cleveland County Library.
- Gordon Johnson, Mobile Plant and Transport Engineer, Thames Water Authority.
- Reginald Johnson, Secretary, Environmental Health Officers' Association.
- Deryck Hadley Jones, chairman, Sandwell Savings Committee.
- Renee Gwendoline Jones, Personnel Officer, British National Oil Corporation.
- Richard Gwynfryn Jones, Inspector of Taxes (Higher Grade), Board of Inland Revenue.
- Joseph Robert Jordan, Warden, Holkham National Nature Reserve.
- Ernest George Kent, chairman, Swindon & Chippenham Disablement Advisory Committee.
- Velta King, Head, Clothing Department, Headquarters, Women's Royal Voluntary Service.
- Susan Margery Tilney Kirton. For services to the Southwell Diocese, Nottingham.
- Arthur Edward Knowles, Pipelines Engineer, British Gas Corporation.
- Albert Edward Langton, vice-president, The Tyne Boys' Club; Treasurer and Secretary, East End Boys' Club and North Shields Boys' Club.
- Diana Law. For services to speech therapy.
- Margaret Ann Learman, Nursing Officer, Eston & Normanby Hospitals, Cleveland Area Health Authority.
- Squadron Leader Douglas George Lee. For services to Gliding.
- John Leonard Leer, Export Director, Norvic Footwear (Overseas) Ltd. For services to Export.
- Lieutenant Commander Philip Le Marquand, chairman, Sea Cadet Corps Committee, Jersey.
- Avril Johnston Clegg Lennox. For services to Gymnastics.
- Walter Edward Leslie, Chief Electrical Designer, Stone Wallwork Ltd. For services to Export.
- Lilian May Logan. For services to the community, particularly the young, in Bootle.
- Henry John Lucas, Regional Organiser, No. 1 Region, Transport and General Workers' Union.
- Walter Victor Luckham, Training Services Officer Grade I, Department of Employment.
- Doreen Ellen Luer, Executive Officer, HM Stationery Office.
- Mary Lumby, Secretary, Pudsey Council of Social Service.
- Donald Honory Naylor Lush, Deputy Clerk to the Justices, Southampton.
- William Allen Gower Macafee, Development Officer, Northern Ireland Railways Co. Ltd.
- David Charles McBride, BEM, Professional and Technical Officer I, Property Services Agency, Department of the Environment.
- Elizabeth Mary McClure, Senior Nursing Officer, Londonderry, Limavady & Strabane District, Western Health & Social Services Board, Northern Ireland.
- Barbara Black McCorkindale, lately Matron, Crookston Old People's Home, Glasgow.
- Robert McCrae, Senior Executive Officer, Department of Employment.
- Coll MacPherson Macdonald, Senior Executive Officer, Ministry of Defence.
- John MAcDonald, Assessor, Crofters' Commission.
- Sylvia Mackenzie, Headteacher, Langworth Boulters Church of England School.
- Leslie Michie McLaren, Chief Superintendent, Strathclyde Police.
- Owen Finlay Maclaren, chairman and Chief Executive, Andrews Maclaren Ltd.
- Pharic Hyndman Maclaren, Senior Producer, Drama, Television, Scotland, British Broadcasting Corporation.
- David Hugh McNeill, Superintendent, Royal Ulster Constabulary.
- Charles Sidney McRonald, deputy chairman, North West Transport Users' Consultative Committee.
- Albert William Mahoney, Employment Officer, South Devon & Cornwall Area, Regular Forces Employment Association.
- Walter Malt, BEM, General Secretary, Durham Area, National Union of Mineworkers.
- Esca Mary Mansford, Divisional Secretary, Uxbridge & Yiewsley and West Drayton, Soldiers', Sailors' and Airmen's Families Association.
- Herbert John Marks. For services to youth in Nottinghamshire.
- Frank Eric Maskell, Entomologist Grade A, Ministry of Agriculture, Fisheries & Food.
- Frederick William Matthews, Senior Executive Officer, Department of Employment.
- Albert Charles Maynard, Assistant to Head, Head Office Communications Centre, Cable & Wireless Ltd.
- Andrew Robert Milbourne, Higher Executive Officer, Department of Health and Social Security.
- Lieutenant Colonel Charles Edwin Mitchell, lately Warden/Naturalist, Wicken Fen, National Trust.
- Edith Gertrude Mitchell, Deputy General Secretary, Commonwealth Headquarters, The Girl Guides' Association.
- Mary Duncan Molison, Representative, 7th Duke of Edinburgh's Own, Gurkha Rifles, Women's Royal Voluntary Service.
- James Leslie Montgomery, Rivers Management Engineer, Public Health Engineering Department, Greater London Council.
- Arthur John Morgan. For services to the community in Newtown, Powys.
- James Owen Morgan. For services to local government in Dyfed.
- William Roderick Morgan, Chief Inspector, South Wales Constabulary.
- Nelly Mould. For services to youth and education in Newcastle under Lyme.
- Harold Charles Mullett, Member, Chesterfield Borough Council.
- Gilbert Edgar Mullins, Founder and chairman, Bath Link of Friendship for Discharged Prisoners.
- Horace Leonard Nicholson, lately Senior Scientific Officer, Warren Spring Laboratory, Department of Industry.
- Leslie James Nicholson, Inspector of Taxes, Board of Inland Revenue.
- Baron Hugo Nikolin, Section Naval Auxiliary Officer, Royal Naval Auxiliary Service.
- Michael Lesney Noakes, Senior Scientific Officer, Atomic Energy Research Establishment, Harwell, United Kingdom Atomic Energy Authority.
- Tom Timothy Norreys, managing director, Avon Inflatables Ltd., Llanelli, Dyfed.
- Angeline Audrey May O'Dell. For services to the community in Hull.
- Jessie West Oliver, lately Old People's Welfare Organiser for Scotland, Women's Royal Voluntary Service.
- Charles James Herbert Page, lately Secretary, Schoolmistresses and Governesses Benevolent Institution.
- Agnes Olive Paget, Director, Redcliffe Old People's Welfare, Bristol.
- Gerald Roy Papworth, Operations Planning Manager, Headquarters, British Railways Board.
- John Lindsay Paterson, Telecommunications Technical Officer (B), Ministry of Defence.
- George James Peach, Member, West Derbyshire District Council.
- Joan Pearson, Appointments Officer, Technical Education and Training Organisation for Overseas Countries.
- William Francis Pellow. For services to the Corporation of the Church House.
- Thomas Jackson Penrith, Area Horticultural Secretary, Kent & East Sussex Branches, National Farmers' Union.
- Harold Victor Thorndyke Percival, Senior Research Assistant, Department of Education & Science.
- Simon Frank Phipps, Chief Superintendent, Metropolitan Police.
- Ella Pounder (Isabella Clapham). For services to music in Middlesbrough and Teesside.
- Thomas Brois Pratt, chairman, Epsom and Ewell Sea Cadet Corps and Girls' Nautical Training Corps.
- Dorothy Joan Price, Senior Executive Officer, Department of the Environment.
- William Smallwood Proud, Secretary/Agent, Cumberland Area, National Union of Mineworkers.
- Hubert George Pullen, Higher Executive Officer, Metropolitan Police Office.
- George Arthur Quinney, Secretary, Isle of Man Trades Council and District Secretary, Transport and General Workers' Union.
- Peter Alyn Ray, lately Principal Lecturer, Leicester Polytechnic.
- Norman Rea. For services to the Boys' Brigade in Northern Ireland.
- Clare Mary Redon (Miss Clare Francis). For services to Sailing.
- Douglas Arthur Reed. For services to the Lord Roberts' Workshops for the Disabled.
- Frederick William Reed. Chief Photographer, Daily Mirror.
- Stephanie Isabel Reed, lately Matron, Monroe Devis Maternity Home, Stratford upon Avon.
- Kenneth Reid, Director, National Bedding Federation.
- Donald Gledhill Rider, lately Senior Executive Officer, Department of Employment.
- Ronald Rivers, Higher Executive Officer, Science Research Council.
- William Robb, lately Professional and Technology Officer Grade I, Ministry of Defence.
- Janet Helen Maxwell Robertson. For services to the Arts and the community in Falkirk.
- John Leslie Robertson, Head-Teacher, Timmergreens Primary School, Arbroath.
- Rose Robinson, chairman, League of Friends, Queen Elizabeth Hospital, Birmingham Area Health Authority.
- Thomas Robinson, Assistant Officer, Board of Customs and Excise.
- Harry Roby, lately Charge Nurse Grade II, St. Thomas' Hospital, Stockport Area Health Authority.
- Andrzej Antoni Florian Romanski, Special Assistant, Product Development, B.S.C. (Chemicals) Ltd.
- Stanley Henry James Roth. For services to the Magistracy in West Sussex.
- Ernest John Joshua Colin Rouse. Member, Gravesham Borough Council.
- Verner Ruddock, Chief Education Welfare Officer, Southern Education and Library Board, Northern Ireland.
- David George Sadler, Park Manager, Burgess Park, Greater London Council.
- Muriel Hume Sandiforth, National Secretary, Women's Section, Royal British Legion.
- Dudley William Savage, Organist.
- Mary Phillida Tudor Sawbridge, Director, Parents for Children (Adoption Agency).
- Reginald Scales, Senior Executive Officer, Board of Customs and Excise.
- Violet Dorothy Seares, Higher Executive Officer, Department of Prices and Consumer Protection.
- Herbert Howard Sergeant, Editor, Outposts.
- Edna Sharp, Secretary, Mather & Platt Ltd.
- Barry Sheene. For services to Motorcycle Racing.
- Kenneth Frank Sheridan, vice-president, Bolton Community Relations Council.
- Mary Stephen Sherrard, Organiser, Central Borders Citizens' Advice Bureau.
- Victor Frederick John Shipp, Senior Executive Officer, Crown Agents for Oversea Governments and Administration.
- Harold Norman Simmons, Higher Executive Officer, Ministry of Overseas Development.
- Seymour Simmons, BEM, Secretary/Manager, Welfare Committee, HMS Pembroke.
- James Smalls, Social Worker for Handicapped People, Cleveland County Council.
- Charles Gordon Smith, Chief Warning Officer, Oxford Group, United Kingdom Warning and Monitoring Organisation.
- Esme Lazelle Smith, Works Visits Officer, Production Services, Teesside Division, British Steel Corporation.
- Leslie Hamilton-Smith, chairman, Hand Crafts Advisory Association for the Disabled.
- Pamela Ann Smith, Executive Officer, Ministry of Defence.
- Reginald Walter Smith, Manager, The Westminster Abbey Bookshop.
- William Leslie Smith, Higher Executive Officer, Department of Health & Social Security.
- David Spence, Curator, Prestongrange Mining Museum and Mining Relics in Scotland.
- Francis William Spencer, Senior Executive Officer, Board of Inland Revenue.
- Michael Stanford, Chief Engineering Instructor, Air Service Training.
- Alexander Newlands Steedman, Contracts Coordination Engineer, Brown Brothers & Co. Ltd.
- James Arthur Stephenson, lately Docks Engineer, British Transport Docks Board, Newport.
- Willi Stern, chairman, Pearl Paints Ltd., Treforest.
- Colin Monteith Steven, General Medical Practitioner, Wigtown.
- William George Stickland, Secretary, British Ring, International Brotherhood of Magicians.
- Edgar David Stogdon, Superintendent of Depots (Isle of Wight), Royal National Lifeboat Institution.
- Clifford Stone, lately Head, Department of Commerce and Economics, Brislington School, Bristol.
- Daniel Sullivan, Senior Executive Officer, Department of Employment.
- William James Sullivan. For services to the food and soft drinks industries.
- Captain William John Sutherland, chairman, Gravesend Unit Committee, Sea Cadet Corps.
- John Walter Swinnerton, TD, chairman, Hertfordshire Savings Committee.
- Madan Lai Talwar. For services to community relations in Gloucestershire.
- Ralph Sidney Taylor, Headmaster, Ty Mawr School, Gilwern.
- James Thomas, Organising Secretary, Gloucestershire Association of Boys' Clubs.
- George Thomas Thompson. For services to brass bands.
- Michael James Thompson, Executive Officer, Department of Health & Social Security.
- Douglas Scott Thomson, TD, Member, Board of Directors, Solicitors' Benevolent Association.
- Gertrude Drummond Thomson, Branch Director, Dundee Branch, British Red Cross Society.
- John Hayhurst Todd, County Rent Officer, Merseyside Metropolitan County Council.
- Joan Gladys Toghill, Senior Personal Secretary, Welsh Office.
- Winifred Dora Toms. For service to the community in Torquay.
- Stewart Bates Trotter, Postal Executive C, Southend Head Post Office, Eastern Postal Region.
- Philip Charles Cardew Truscott, Principal, Adult Education, London Borough of Hillingdon.
- Lilian Rosina Tucker. For services to the community and local government in Brynmawr, Gwent.
- Norman Clarke Tulip, Professional and Technical Officer II, Northern Ireland Office.
- Thomas Colyer Venning, lately County Divisional Surveyor, North Yorkshire County Council.
- Sally Elizabeth Verity, Dental Auxiliary, London Hospital Medical College Dental School.
- Basil Raymond Vickers, Public Relations Officer, South of Scotland Electricity Board.
- William Edward Vince, District Organiser (South West District), Furniture, Timber and Allied Trades Union.
- John Berry Waggott, Director, International Medical Supplies & Services Ltd., Stafford.
- George Bert Walden, chairman, Northamptonshire and North Buckinghamshire District Manpower Committee.
- Arthur Stewart Wales, chairman and managing director, Stewart Wales Somerville Ltd. For services to Export.
- Charles Sidney Walker, Treasurer, Abbeyfield Society, Weston-super-Mare.
- Mary Walker, Emergency Services Organise Berkshire, Women's Royal Voluntary Service.
- Nancy Lilian Walker, lately Warden, County Youth Centre, Grendon Hall, Northampton.
- Ivor Kenneth Walters, Professional and Technology Officer Grade I, Ministry of Defence.
- Kenneth Wanklyn, Higher Executive Officer, Ministry of Defence.
- Elizabeth Despard Ward, President, Silver Lining Appeal, British Kidney Patient Association.
- Arthur Cutts-Watson, Controller, Group Visit Department, Institute of Directors. For services to Export.
- Sidney Weintroub, Visiting Jewish Chaplain, Winchester, Parkhurst, Camp Hill and Alban Prisons.
- Edward Weymouth, lately Head, Music Department, Penzance County Grammar School for Girls.
- Henry Alfred White, Deputy Divisional Architect Greater London Council.
- Norman Austin White, lately Professional and Technology Officer I, Ministry of Defence.
- Philip Thomas White, Secretary, Hampshire Society for Autistic Children.
- Terence William White, Headmaster, Parkland Middle School, Northampton.
- Kenneth Whitfield, Observer Commander, Group Commandant No. 23 Group, Durham, Royal Observer Corps.
- Lieutenant Commander George William Wilcox, Royal Navy (Retd.), Retired Officer Grade II, Ministry of Defence.
- William Arthur Wildman, lately Area Secretary Kent, National Federation of Building Trades Employers.
- Harold Cyril Williams, Sales Manager, Naval Systems, Plessey Radar Ltd. For services to Export.
- John Burton Wilson, Chief Medical Officer, St. Andrews Ambulance Association.
- Robert Esmond Winch, Forging Consultant, G.K.N. Forgings Ltd.
- Ruth Jenny Wolf. For services to disabled people in Birmingham.
- Stanley Barnett Woodall, Senior Officer, Board of Customs and Excise.
- Maud Winifred Wrigglesworth, Higher Executive Officer, Ministry of Defence.
- Cecil Boothroyd Wright, Export Sales Manager, Davy Roll Co. Ltd. For services to Export.
- Douglas Arthur Wright, MC, Treasurer, National Coal Board.
- Patricia Mary Younger, Controller of Typists, Department of the Civil Service for Northern Ireland.

Diplomatic Service and Overseas List

- Jane Stephen Alcock. For services to education in Rome.
- Albert Valentine Anderson. For services to the community in the Cayman Islands.
- Edward David Argy, Assistant Administration Officer, British Consulate-General, Naples.
- Joshua Roger Barber. For public and community. services in Fiji.
- Hamish Ingram Buchanan Barclay. For services to the British community in Denmark.
- Eric Julian Bathe. For services to British commercial interests and the British community in Penang.
- The Reverend John Russell Berg. For welfare services to seamen in Yokohama.
- Captain Robin Bibby, Marine Superintendent, British National Service, New Hebrides, Condominium.
- Deirdre Patricia Bird. For services to education in Kuwait.
- Hewitt Alexander Boyd, lately First Secretary (Consular) British High Commission, Port of Spain.
- Joan Constance Boyle. For services to the British community in Singapore.
- Sister Mary Elsie Brooks, Nursing Sister, Medical Department, Gibraltar.
- Barbara Mary Brown de Calderon, General Duties Officer, British Council, Colombia.
- Mary Rhys Browne. For welfare services to children in Colombia.
- Cara Evanzeloo Burns, Matron, Medical Department, Belize.
- John Edward Cawley. For services to the development of education in Kenya.
- Hoi-sang Charm. For public and community services in Hong Kong.
- Anthony John Child, Chief Education Officer, Department of Education, Solomon Islands.
- Keith Forrester Chiswell. For services to the British community in Argentina.
- Trevor David Clare. For services to education and the British community in Jedda.
- Neville Andrew Clarke. For services to the British community in Libya.
- John Herbert Clarke. For services to the British community in Barcelona.
- Walter Frederick Leonard Coleshill, Second Secretary and Vice-Consul, HM Embassy, Pretoria.
- Margery Lilian Farrar Cox. For services to the British community in Famagusta, Cyprus.
- Audrey Crawford, lately Personal Assistant to HM Ambassador, Tel Aviv.
- Joan Denham, Principal Nursing Officer, Medical Department, British National Service, New Hebrides Condominium.
- Darnell Alvin Diaz, Principal Education Officer, Education Department, Belize.
- Major Alfred Dutton, Honorary British Consul, Mérida, Mexico.
- Clifford John William Forrester, lately Attache and Vice-Consul, HM Embassy, Budapest.
- George Lisle Fraser, Executive Assistant, Office of the Premier, St. Vincent.
- Mary Freeland. For services to the British community in Sarawak, Malaysia.
- John Fromow. For welfare services to the community in Gibraltar.
- Gerald Sydney Wakefield Gush, Vice-Consul (Commercial), British Consulate-General, Houston.
- George John Stewart Harris. For services to the British community in Denmark.
- Edith Law Hawtrey. For services to the British community in Argentina.
- Thomas Hennessy. For services to British ex-servicemen in Belgium.
- Michael Stuart Hone, lately Administration Officer, HM Embassy, Beirut.
- John Ogilvy Houlton, Vice-Consul (Information), British Consulate-General, Los Angeles.
- Frances Hsiung, lately Principal Trade Officer, Commerce and Industry Department, Hong Kong.
- Khalil Wakim Imran, Accountant, HM Embassy, Beirut.
- John Albert Sidney Jackson, Senior Education Officer, Ministry of Education, Bermuda.
- Maureen Edith Carmel Kincaid, Films and Television Officer, Information Department, British High Commission, Ottawa.
- Peter Henry Arthur Kinsella, Second Secretary and Vice-Consul, HM Embassy, Paris.
- Jean Carter Kirk, Senior Personal Assistant, British High Commission, New Delhi.
- Bridget Lawlor, Assistant Press Officer, British Consulate-General, Sidney.
- Jean Francois Lesieur, Pilot, Mosquito Research and Control Unit, Cayman Islands.
- Arthur Gwaenys Lewis, Commercial Officer, British Consulate-General, Adelaide.
- Maxine Li Kwok. For services to the community in Hong Kong.
- Marion Moss de Miranda Lima. For services to British cultural interests in Brazil.
- Rosemary McChesney. For nursing services to the community in the Lebanon.
- Theoline Lillis McCoy, Education Officer, Cayman Islands.
- John Burnett McIntosh. For services to British commercial interests and the rubber industry in Malaysia.
- Sarah Ann McMillan, lately Special Assistant, Secretary-General's Office, United Nations, New York.
- Rowland Alexander Melville McVicker. For medical services to the community in Kenya.
- Ronald James McWilliam, Transport Supervisor, HM Embassy, Brussels.
- The Reverend Canon Ernest William Lunn Martin. For educational and welfare services to the community in Hong Kong.
- Norman Singleton Mayne. For services to Anglo-Argentine relations.
- George St. Maur Mills. For services to British commercial interests in Alabama.
- David Barnabas Moore, Vice-Consul (Commercial) British Consulate-General, Atlanta.
- Dennis John Morgan, MM, CPM For services to Anglo-Bahamian relations.
- Patrick Reginald Felix Morgan, Medical Officer, Turks and Caicos Islands.
- Eric Arthur Mortemore, CPM For services to Anglo-Bahamian relations.
- Patricia Jane Neville. For services to leprosy control in Ethiopia.
- Joseph Nunez, City Electrical Engineer, Electricity Department, Gibraltar.
- Dominic Otuana, Clerk to the Town Council, Honiara, Solomon Islands.
- Frances Fitz-Warine Parkes. For services to the British community in Chile.
- Adrian Henry Penrose. For services to the teaching of English in West Africa.
- Godfrey Hilton Perkin. For services to the British community in Portugal.
- Theresa Dorothy Pilgrim. For services to the community in St. Lucia.
- Mary Buchanan Quinton. For medical services to children in Switzerland.
- Alfred Matthew Renner, Commercial Officer, HM Embassy, Monrovia.
- Kenneth Rusling. For services to British commercial interests in Dubai, United Arab Emirates.
- Samuel Saki. For public and community services in the Solomon Islands.
- Ann Patricia Salmon, British High Commission Liaison Officer, Kano, Nigeria.
- Max Schuchart, lately Information Assistant, HM Embassy, The Hague.
- Raymond Sidney George Shortland, Second Secretary (Consular) HM Embassy, Oslo.
- Kathleen Mary Skipsey. For educational and welfare services to disabled children in Mauritius.
- Patricia Stathatos. For services to animal welfare in Greece.
- Alexander Lumsden Stewart. For services to the development of physical education in Kenya.
- Charles Denis Stuart. For services to the community in Bermuda.
- Mary Lillian Stubbs. For services to the community in Port Moresby.
- Joeli Taoi, District Medical Officer, British National Service, New Hebrides Condominium.
- Nelly Charlotte Stephanie Julie Tarlton. For services to the British community in Belgium.
- Andrew Teabo Tongaiaba. For public and community services in the Gilbert Islands.
- Gwendolyn Moreen Tonge, Home Economics Supervisor, Ministry of Education, Antigua.
- Annette Louise Treble, Information and Consular Assistant, British Government Trade Office, Winnipeg.
- Albert Roye Tribe, Principal Game Warden, National Parks and Wildlife Department, Malawi.
- Ethel Dorothy Vargas. For services to education in Belize.
- Jack Alec Wallace, Principal Government Engineer, Public Works Department, Hong Kong.
- Christine Mary Warren-Tutte. For services to education in Athens.
- Edward Owen Watkins. For services to the British community in Patagonia.
- Richard Francis Gregory Whale, lately Senior Clerk, Military Standardisation Agency, North Atlantic Treaty Organization, Brussels.
- Ting-Sang Woo. For services to the community in Hong Kong.
- Patricia Wood. For services to the British community in Kuala Lumpur.
- Fay Elizabeth Wright. For services to education and the community in the Solomon Islands.

Australian States

State of New South Wales

- James Montague Bonwick. For services to medicine.
- Bede John Buckley. For services to the community.
- Joyce Caroline Clague. For services to Aborigines.
- Robert Henry Collard. For services to the community.
- Janet Dawson (Mrs. M. Boddy). For services to art.
- Charles Colbran Eastes. For services to sport.
- Thomas John Finnane, ED. For services to the community.
- The Reverend Arthur James Alexander Fraser. For services to the church.
- Lieutenant-Colonel George James Edward Godkin (Salvation Army). For services to the community.
- Roy Stanton Grieve. For services to local government and the community.
- Arthur Gordon Kinder. For services to the community and to ex-servicemen.
- Keith Laurence King. For services to the community and medicine.
- June Ellen Loney. For services to music.
- Patricia Anne Lovell. For services to television and the film industry.
- John Joseph O'Toole. For services to sport.
- Hermine Rainow. For services to the community.
- Norah Doris Spence. For services to nursing.
- Nanette Stacey Waddy. For services to medicine.
- Donald Perry Walker. For services to.the club hotel industry.
- Nancie Wicks. For services to sport.
- Josephine Zammit. For services to the ethnic community.

State of Victoria

- Edna Louise Barrett Chandler, of The Basin. For services to the performing arts.
- Dorothy Jean Clark, of Toorak. For services to the community.
- Esme Weldon Dunell, of Box Hill North. For public service.
- William Arthur Edgar, of Chadstone. For services to sport.
- Ernest Edwin Gunn, of Carnegie. For municipal and community services.
- Irene Wilkelmina Ballantyne-Heard, of Hawthorn. For services to nursing.
- Councillor Stewart Lewis Randolph Hocking, of Bendigo. For municipal and community services.
- Charles Dudley Lanyon, of Mildura. For public service.
- Eric John Joseph Lee, of Stratford. For municipal and community services.
- Philip Alexander William Macpherson, of Black Rock. For public service.
- Major Geoffrey Guy Harington Peace, of Pulborough, Sussex, England. For public. service.
- Timothy Joseph Shea, of Bacchus Marsh. For municipal and community services.
- Walter Roy Shepherd, of South Yarra. For services to the performing arts.
- John Squire Silcock, of via Balmoral. For services to rural industry.
- Max William Yunghanns, of Hawthorn. For services to Returned Service organisations.

State of Queensland

- William Frederick Aplin (Senior), of Mount Isa. For services to the community.
- Mabel Cecil, of Gympie. For services to the community.
- Edward Laurence Evans, of Mundingburra. For services to the community.
- Councillor Charles Harvey Fuller, of Chinchilla. For services to local government and the community.
- Reginald Bowen Lynch, of Charleville. For services to local government and the community.
- Mary Eta Moore, of Kedron. For services to the Girl Guides' Movement.
- John Patrick Murray, of Wavell Heights. For services to the drycleaning industry.
- Ivy Bartz Schultz, of Kelvin Grove. For services to nursing.
- James John Sheeran, of Brookfield. For services to the bread manufacturing industry.
- Clement Stephen Scudamore-Smith, of via Kingaroy. For services to the community.
- Alan Patrick Thomas, of Stafford Heights. For services to music.
- Norman James Wright, of Manly. For services to yachting.

State of Western Australia

- Mary Brazier, Establishment of Government House, Perth.
- William Robert Jacob Burns, of South Perth. For services to disabled children and young adults.
- Louis Fenwick, of Dampier. For services to medicine and the community.
- Thomas Augustine Hartrey, of Boulder. For services to the law and politics.
- Milson John Howard Porter, of Attadale. For services to sport and the community.
- Erica Reid Underwood, of Nedlands. For services to radio, education and the community.

=== Order of the Companions of Honour (CH) ===
- James Larkin Jones, MBE, General Secretary, Transport and General Workers' Union.
- Frank Raymond Leavis. For services to the study of English Literature.

=== Companion of the Imperial Service Order (ISO) ===
Home Civil Service

- Geoffrey Cyril Harold Breden, Senior Principal, Department of Employment.
- Ronald Terence Broyd, Senior Inspector, Board of Customs and Excise.
- John Akehurst Covell, Principal, Ministry of Agriculture, Fisheries & Food.
- Thomas Walter Grant, Principal, Department of Commerce, Northern Ireland.
- Eric John Guy, Senior Principal, Department of Transport.
- Bernard Cecil Harris, lately Principal, Lord Chancellor's Department.
- Alfred Sydney Harvey, lately Principal, Property Services Agency, Department of the Environment.
- Robert Fraser Hendry, Governor Class I, HM Prison Barlinnie, Glasgow.
- John Douglas Hibberd, DSC, Principal, Ministry of Defence.
- William John James, Senior Principal Scientific Officer, Ministry of Defence.
- Frederick Arthur Ventris Jenkins, Principal, Home Office.
- Victor Kidd, lately Chief Fire Service Officer, Ministry of Defence.
- Philip Conway Menhennett, Senior Principal, Board of Inland Revenue.
- William Winder Nicholson, Senior Valuer, Board of Inland Revenue.
- Leslie Noble, Principal, Department of Industry.
- John Leonard Paice, MBE, Principal, Ministry of Defence.
- James Claud Plowman, Senior Principal Scientific Officer, Ministry of Defence.
- Norman Arthur Reginald Seymour, Principal, Ministry of Defence.
- Juston O'Grady Tatton, Senior Principal Scientific Officer, Department of Industry.
- James Alexander Taylor, Chief Examiner, Board of Inland Revenue.
- Henry Francis Thomas, Senior Principal, Department of Health and Social Security.
- Maurice Alfred Way, Foreign and Commonwealth Office.

Diplomatic Service and Overseas List

- David Hampton, Senior Superintendent of Prisons, Hong Kong.
- Tim Ioteba, Chief Customs Officer, Gilbert Islands.
- Mou-chi Lao, Assistant Commissioner for Labour, Hong Kong.
- Douglas Alexander Neish, Senior Superintendent, Preventive Service, Hong Kong.

Australian States

State of New South Wales

- John Joseph Hurley, chairman, Electricity Commission of New South Wales.

State of Victoria

- John Henry Winter Birrell, of Foster. Lately Victoria Police Surgeon.
- Roderick David Lovat Fraser, of Eaglemont. Lately Chairman, Town & Country Planning Board.

State of Queensland

- Cyril George, Clerk of the Parliament.

State of Western Australia

- Horace Raymond Smith, Director of Administration, Medical & Health Services.

=== British Empire Medal (BEM) ===
Military Division

Royal Navy

- Chief Control Electrical Mechanician Keith Neville Bowen, M946751Y.
- Chief Petty Officer Medical Assistant Ernest Bowns, M863749X.
- Master at Arms Cecil Barry Brennan, M816593F.
- Chief Petty Officer Medical Assistant Anthony William French, D050926S.
- Chief Radio Supervisor Kennon Gair, J938453B.
- Sergeant Robin William Gray, Royal Marines, P022894P.
- Chief Petty Officer Jack Dudley Harris, D989000C, Royal Naval Reserve.
- Colour Sergeant Leslie Arthur Hills, Royal Marines, P016019R.
- Chief Radio Electrician Barry Sanford Jarman, ZD984951Y, Royal Naval Reserve.
- Ordnance Electrical Artificer I John Kempton Phillips Jones, D087236E.
- Ordnance Electrical Mechanician (L)l David John King, M933365D.
- Petty Officer Writer Peter John Lane, M952851K.
- Chief Petty Officer Writer John Richard Lunn, D054889F.
- Chief Marine Engineering Mechanic Robert McWhinnie, K965123U.
- Radio Electrical Mechanician 1 Richard Henry Morgans, D128156N.
- Master at Arms Michael William Frederick O'Neill, D159764Q.
- Colour Sergeant George Douglas Palmer, Royal Marines, R001827B.
- Chief Medical Technician David Bevan Price, M966613K.
- Chief Marine Engineering Artificer (H) Peter Ernest Quick, D132387W.
- Petty Officer Marine Engineering Mechanic Gordon Richard Ray, K921213K.
- Chief Petty Officer Stores Accountant Joseph Charles Sansom, M798120T.
- Chief Ordnance Electrician Clifford Thomas Sawdon, M942077Y.
- Aircraft Mechanician 1 (A/E) Anthony Harold Slater, F974844M.
- Corporal Paul Francis Snelson, Royal Marines, P027849C.
- Petty Officer Writer John Andrew Stansfield, D121758U.
- Acting Chief Petty Officer (Sea)Bt George Donald Stuart, J942460X.
- Sergeant Norman James Thomas, Royal Marines, P0262S7L.
- Petty Officer Physical Trainer William Anthony Witham, D051131A.
- Petty Officer Cook Brian Gerald Worth, M924626E.

Army

- 22545176 Corporal (Lance Sergeant) Geoffrey Samuel Allen, Grenadier Guards.
- 24007597 Corporal Paul Richard Allen, The Parachute Regiment
- 23507942 Corporal George Appleby, Royal Army Ordnance Corps.
- 23886722 Staff Sergeant (Acting Warrant Officer Class 2) Malcolm Brian Baker, Royal Corps of Transport.
- 23659131 Sergeant Ronald Bennett, Royal Corps of Transport.
- 23946372 Sergeant Geoffrey Stewart Blackshaw, The Cheshire Regiment.
- 23768826 Staff Sergeant Barry Blanchard, Royal Corps of Transport.
- 23990865 Staff Sergeant (now Acting Warrant Officer Class 2) Gerald Brennan, Royal Corps of Transport.
- 23784955 Staff Sergeant Edwin John Benny Bruton, Corps of Royal Electrical and Mechanical Engineers.
- 21157989 Corporal Chhumbetshering Lama, 10th Princess Mary's Own Gurkha Rifles.
- 23884478 Staff Sergeant Raymond George Collins, Corps of Royal Engineers, Territorial & Army Volunteer Reserve.
- 24106620 Staff Sergeant Mark Stephen Corthine, Royal Corps of Transport.
- 24000426 Staff Sergeant Matthew Munro Davidson, Scots Guards.
- 24198094 Sergeant Peter Glynne Davies, Royal Army Pay Corps.
- 23999094 Staff Sergeant Robert Neil Ellison, Royal Army Ordnance Corps.
- 24025249 Sergeant (Acting Staff Sergeant) Keith Alfred Fowler, Royal Army Ordnance Corps.
- 24020569 Staff Sergeant (Acting Warrant Officer Class 2) Colin William Carton, The Queen's Regiment.
- 22691965 Sergeant Ronald Alfred Gorman, Royal Regiment of Artillery, Territorial & Army Volunteer Reserve.
- 22398378 Bombardier (Acting Sergeant) Harry Hardy, Royal Regiment of Artillery.
- 22457519 Staff Sergeant Ronald Cyril Harrison, Royal Army Medical Corps, Territorial & Army Volunteer Reserve.
- 23002525 Staff Sergeant (Acting Warrant Officer Class 2) Patrick Holmes, Army Catering Corps.
- 23657036 Sergeant Padraic Michael Hoolihan, Corps of Royal Electrical and Mechanical Engineers.
- 21158089 Lance Corporal Imanhang Limbu, The Queen's Gurkha Engineers.
- 24075914 Staff Sergeant Keith Edward James, Intelligence Corps.
- 23493123 Staff Sergeant William Henry Kelly, The Queen's Royal Irish Hussars.
- 22284628 Bombardier (Acting Sergeant) James Benjamin Lorriman, Royal Regiment of Artillery.
- W/111839 Lance Corporal (Acting Corporal) Bertha Irene Ludlow, Women's Royal Army Corps (now Discharged).
- 22115128 Staff Sergeant Raymond McGreade, The Worcestershire and Sherwood Foresters Regiment (29th/45th Foot).
- 23956661 Sergeant Michael Probyn Munn, Royal Corps of Signals.
- 23721887 Corporal William Graham Nellist, The Duke of Wellington's Regiment (West Riding).
- W/439969 Corporal (Acting Sergeant) Ann Parry, Women's Royal Army Corps.
- 24092588 Corporal James Ralph Potter, Royal Army Ordnance Corps.
- 23990715 Staff Sergeant Ian Gordon Read, Royal Army Ordnance Corps.
- 23972062 Sergeant Gareth Reincke, Grenadier Guards.
- 23745341 Staff Sergeant William Edward Sayer, Royal Corps of Transport.
- 23744738 Staff Sergeant (Acting Warrant Officer Class 2) Bryan Henry Stafford, Corps of Royal Engineers.
- W/432694 Corporal (Acting Sergeant) Veronica Christina Bridget Stone, Women's Royal Army Corps.
- 23984039 Sergeant (Acting Staff Sergeant) Stephen Paul Sykes, The Royal Anglian Regiment.
- 23467683 Corporal George William Turner, The Royal Hampshire Regiment.
- 24136757 Sergeant Charles David Walker, Corps of Royal Electrical and Mechanical Engineers.
- 23391289 Staff Sergeant (Acting Warrant Officer Class 2) Douglas John West, Army Catering Corps.
- 22537372 Corporal (Local Sergeant) Clifford Glyndwr Wilson, Royal Corps of Signals, Territorial & Army Volunteer Reserve.
- 23253419 Staff Sergeant Kenneth Mervyn Williams, Royal Army Medical Corps.
- 22826747 Staff Sergeant William Charles Wright, The Queen's Royal Irish Hussars (now Discharged).
- 22205969 Staff Sergeant Anthony John Graham. Young, Royal Corps of Transport.

Royal Air Force

- Acting Warrant Officer Edward Cogan (D0585601).
- Acting Warrant Officer (now Warrant Officer) John David William Cooper (B0586525).
- Acting Warrant Officer Roy William McNeir (M4011880).
- Acting Warrant Officer Basil Harris Shatford (D1882809).
- Q4137002 Flight Sergeant John Baker.
- Q0587066 Flight Sergeant Ronald William Bath.
- G4010442 Flight Sergeant Maurice Walter Berry.
- H0584733 Flight Sergeant Sidney Thomas Brenchley.
- M4155726 Flight Sergeant Robert Gordon Callaghan.
- U4011063 Flight Sergeant Francis Campbell.
- D4007990 Flight Sergeant James Joseph Duffy.
- K0584458 Flight Sergeant John William Dyball.
- J4186576 Flight Sergeant Colin Rees Jones.
- M4148843 Flight Sergeant Peter Brian Reynard.
- P0587700 Flight Sergeant Gordon Roland Reynolds.
- S4196624 Flight Sergeant Eric Smart.
- E0594091 Flight Sergeant Roger Lewis Smith.
- D0723752 Acting Flight Sergeant Winston Donald Bernard.
- M4136049 Chief Technician Derek William Allcott.
- T0682968 Chief Technician Alfred David John Longland.
- N0681581 Chief Technician Ian Stuart Newton.
- W0682262 Chief Technician Roy Douglas Nevile Perkins.
- Q0686011 Chief Technician Ronald Stoves.
- D1936044 Sergeant Thomas Henry Hart.
- T0589965 Sergeant Michael John Mines.
- K0593055 Sergeant Brian John Wills.
- R1937631 Sergeant Dennis Frederick Wreford.
- J8094059 Corporal Ian Hooper.
- E8038588 Corporal Lynne Pollitt, Women's Royal Air Force.

Civil Division

United Kingdom

- Israel Abernethy, Sub Postmaster, Carnmoney, Mossley and Whitehouse, Belfast Head Post Office, Northern Ireland Postal and Telecommunications Board.
- Enid Mary Adams. For services to the community, particularly to the hospitals, in the Sheffield area.
- Malcolm Richard Adams, Professional and Technology Officer Grade IV, RAF Manston, Ministry of Defence.
- Henry Stanley Adlam, lately Senior Messenger, Northern Ireland Office.
- Walter Allcock, Sergeant, Greater Manchester Police.
- George Robert Armstrong, Plaster Orderly, Erne Hospital, Enniskillen, Co. Fermanagh.
- Thomas Edward Atkins, Instrument Maker, Electrical & Musical Industries Electronics Ltd.
- Harold Bagshaw, Composting Plant Operator, Composting Plant, Pilsley, Derbyshire County Council.
- Ismail Hakki Balcilar, Foreign and Commonwealth Office.
- John Leslie Kenneth Banham, Constable, Metropolitan Police.
- Freda Evelyn Beeby, National Savings Group Collector, Bedford.
- Doris Gwendoline Belton, National Savings Group Collector, London Borough of Lewisham.
- Agnes May Berkley, Group Member, Sussex Branch, British Red Cross Society.
- Philip James Berry, Senior Constable, Oxford University Police.
- Jennet Bevan, Branch Officer, Mid Glamorgan Branch, British Red Cross Society.
- James Black, Storeman, Officers' Training Corps, Queen's University, Belfast, Ministry of Defence.
- Walter Henry Blackie, Banqueting Head Waiter, Refreshment Department, House of Commons.
- Thomas Ferguson Jamison Blair, lately Station Officer, Northern Ireland Airport Fire Service.
- Stefan Bolton, Jointer's Mate, Enfield District, Eastern Electricity Board.
- David William Booth, Apprentice Training and Safety Officer, Messrs George Angus Ltd., Wallsend.
- Shirley William Brewin, Chargehand, Marconi Radar Systems Ltd., Leicester.
- Roy William Brigstock, Instrument Fitter, Guided Weapons Division, British Aerospace (B.A.C.).
- Reginald Charles Bristow, Foreman of Horses at Agricultural shows.
- Joseph Brough, Storeman, Doncasters Sheffield Ltd.
- Cyril Ray Brown, Macebearer/Mayor's Chauffeur, Kettering District Council.
- Alice Mary Bunting, lately Cleaner-in-Charge, East Winch VA School, Norfolk.
- Hugh Burns, Unit Operator, Northern Ireland Electricity Service.
- Rosa Lilian Burton, Chargehand, Remploy Ltd., Barking.
- Florence Emily Busby. For services to the St. John Ambulance Brigade at the Silverstone Motor Racing Circuit.
- Walter Marshall Butler, Welder, Manufacturing Division, Redpath Dorman Long Ltd., British Steel Corporation.
- William Macdonald Campbell, Building Inspector, Scottish Special Housing Association.
- George Cantley, Production Foreman, Ferranti Ltd.
- George Thomas Bucan Chapman, Wood Carver, Crafts and Lettering Centre.
- Ronald Spencer Charrington, Contracts Supervisor, J. Mowlem & Co.
- Frank Clark, Surface Worker, Hatfield Colliery, Doncaster Area, National Coal Board.
- Gordon Harry Cliffe, Electrician (Category IV), Crewe Works, British Railways.
- Henry Alfred Cole, Constable, Metropolitan Police.
- Percival Charles Collins, lately Plumber, Property Services Agency, Department of the Environment.
- Jack Courtney, Shift Manager, The Templeborough Rolling Mills Ltd.
- Lionel Cowan, lately Warder Grade IV, British Museum.
- William Charles Craig, Foreign and Commonwealth Office.
- Alexander Brady Cullen, Revenue Assistant, Board of Customs and Excise.
- Margaret Millar Cunningham, Savings Group Collector, Perth.
- Florence Alexina Jannette Curtis, Housekeeper, Merchant Navy Hotel, Cardiff.
- Harry Reginald Daff, Operations and Maintenance Engineer, Anglian Water Authority.
- William Kenneth Dally, Chief Steward I, Candidates' Mess, Regular Commissions Board, Westbury, Ministry of Defence.
- Frederick John D'Arcy, Sergeant, Humberside Police.
- Frederick James Datchler, Office Keeper Grade II, Board of Inland Revenue.
- Thomas Llewellyn Cynon Davies. For services to disabled children in Abercynon, Mid-Glamorgan.
- Vera Evelyn Davies, County Food Organiser, Bedfordshire, Women's Royal Voluntary Service.
- Donald Enos Deakins, lately Constable, Gloucestershire Constabulary.
- Duncan MacMillan Dick, Superintendent, J. R. McDermott, Ardersier, Inverness.
- Robert Dingwall, Shift Superintendent, Highlands Fabricators Ltd.
- Stanley Vere Dishart, Chief Tea Blender, R. Twining & Co. Ltd. For services to Export.
- Thomas Dodd, Senior Foreman, Anderson Strathclyde Ltd., Glasgow.
- Ronald George Doughty, Skilled Grinder, Alfred Herbert Ltd.
- Kenneth Drabble, District Ranger, Peak District National Park.
- Derek Vernille Driscoll, Shift Foreman, Electrolytic Tinning, Trostre Works, British Steel Corporation.
- Dorothy Agnes Eatwell, Laundry Superintendent, Church Hill House Hospital, Berkshire Area Health Authority.
- John Eccles, Drainage Plant Operator, Department of Agriculture, Northern Ireland.
- Cyril Edwards, Driver, Wolverhampton, London Midland Region, British Railways.
- Ivor Hopkin Edwards, Shepherd, Pwllpeiran Experimental Husbandry Farm, Ministry of Agriculture, Fisheries & Food.
- Albert Reginald Elliot, Storeman, Britannia Royal Naval College, Dartmouth, Ministry of Defence.
- Albert John Elliott, lately Verger, St. Margaret's Church, Westminster.
- David Haydn Erasmus, Chief Storekeeper, EMI Sound & Vision Equipment Ltd., Treorchy, Mid Glamorgan.
- James Patrick Eustace, Assistant Administrative Instructor, Army Cadet Force.
- Richard Blarney Fisher, lately Constable, Metropolitan Police.
- Frederick George Ford, Garage Supervisor, Acrow Automation Ltd.
- Jeannie Fraser. For services to the community, particularly the elderly, in Arbroath.
- Jack French, Quality Inspector, Moxon Huddersfield Ltd.
- Edward Albert Fulker, Head Porter, Shire Hall, Reading, Berkshire County Council.
- Rose Ann Gaffney, Cleaner, Sheriff Court, Edinburgh.
- Arthur George Garwood, Assistant Storekeeper, Metropolitan Police Office.
- Leslie Thomas George, Principal Doorkeeper, House of Lords.
- George William Gill, Plater, Swan Hunter Shipbuilders Ltd.
- Kenneth Gordon Glover, lately Process and General Supervisory Grade E, Army Air Corps Centre, Middle Wallop, Ministry of Defence.
- Harold William Goodwin, Sub Officer, Warwickshire Fire Brigade.
- Charles Gough, Craftsman Boilermaker, National Gas Turbine Establishment, Haslar, Ministry of Defence.
- Horatio Grocott, Bus Driver, Hockley Garage, West Midlands Passenger Transport Executive.
- Arthurrina Augusta Hagley, Cleaner, Board of Customs and Excise.
- Edith Harriet Haines. For services to the elderly in Gloucester.
- John George Harrison, Professional and Technology Officer Grade III, Quality Assurance Directorate, Ministry of Defence.
- John Samuel Harrison. For services to football in Nottinghamshire.
- Margaret Inch Hatch, Production Worker, Royal Ordnance Factory, Blackburn, Ministry of Defence.
- Lawrence Chapman Hatfield, General Hand, West Riding Fabrics Ltd.
- Eva Dora Hawkins, Local Organiser, Seaford Women's Royal Voluntary Service.
- Benjamin Hawthorne. For services to New Cross Hospital, Wolverhampton Area Health Authority.
- Doris Elizabeth Hay, Home Help, Kent County Council.
- George Sidney Hazell, Section Leader, Orders and Shipping, Pirelli General Cable Works Ltd. For Services to Export.
- David Cecil Maurice Hazelton, Sergeant, Royal Ulster Constabulary.
- Elsie Frances Heason, National Savings Group Collector, Rushcliffe.
- Thomas Bernard Hemingway, Assistant Colliery Safety Officer, Silverwood Colliery, South Yorkshire Area, National Coal Board.
- Blanche Maud May Hill. For services to the Boy Scout movement in Central Bristol.
- Edmund Guy Hillier, Station Warden, Aberthaw 'A' & 'B' Power Stations, South Western Region, Central Electricity Generating Board.
- Jean Hodgson, District Organiser, Derwentside, Durham County, Women's Royal Voluntary Service.
- Alexander Thomson Ogilvie Hogg, lately Manager, General Publications Gathering/Sewing Department, Wm. Collins Sons & Co. Ltd., Glasgow.
- Wilfred Hoggard, Asphalt Superintendent, Hampshire County Council.
- Charles William Hughes, Chief Paperkeeper, Insolvency Service, Bankruptcy High Court.
- Kathleen Margaret Hunter, Assistant Catering Manager, Weymouth & District Hospital, Dorset Area Health Authority.
- Samuel Hunter, Driver, Northern Ireland Carriers Ltd.
- Thomas Ireland, lately Shepherd, Hill Farming Research Organisation.
- Donald Ross Jack, Motor Mechanic, Anstruther Life-boat, Royal National Lifeboat Institution.
- Robert Herbert Jack, Enrolled Nurse, Craig Dunain Hospital, Inverness.
- Kenneth William James, Chargehand I, Transport Section, Atomic Energy Research Establishment, Harwell.
- George Albert Jarvis, Stores Officer Grade C, RAF Kemble, Ministry of Defence.
- Cissie Jasper, Sub-assembly Operative, BSR Ltd.
- David George Jezard, Chargehand, Facsimile Assembly Department, Muirhead Ltd.
- William Clement John, lately Blast Furnace Scale Car Driver, Port Talbot Works, British Steel Corporation.
- Eamon Alphonsus Johnston, Constable, Metropolitan Police.
- Peter Henry Hamilton Jones, Telephonist, Department of Employment.
- Stanley Raymond Jones, Garage Supervisor, British Broadcasting Corporation.
- Sibyl Hulme Judge, Member, Metropolitan District, Leeds, Women's Royal Voluntary Service.
- James Keane, lately Despatch Supervisor, Building Ltd.
- Denis Edward Kewell, Foreman (Grade 3), Cleaners, Gatekeepers & Security, Southern Electricity Board.
- Howard Kiernan, Finishing Shop Foreman, Stone Manganese Marine Ltd.
- George Brian Knight, Messenger, Department of Health and Social Security.
- Denis Edmund Knott, Process and General Supervisory Grade V, HMS. Royal Arthur, Ministry of Defence.
- Phyllis Pearl Latham, Reproduction Grade BI, Ordnance Survey.
- Jonathan James Clifford Lee, Foreign and Commonwealth Office.
- John Charles Lilly, Head Gardener, Trelissick Gardens, Feock, Cornwall, The National Trust.
- Freda Blanche Linscott, lately Manageress, United Services Officers' Club, Plymouth.
- Rose Marie Lloyd, Chargehand Telephone Operator, Capenhurst Works, British Nuclear Fuels Ltd.
- Sydney Lofthouse, Drainage Officer, Ouse & Derwent Internal Drainage Boards.
- Leonard Cornelius Lusted, College Superintendent, Goldsmiths' College, London.
- John Lyons, lately Ship's Cook, General Council of British Shipping.
- Samuel McBride, Constable, Royal Ulster Constabulary.
- James McCarter, Professional and Technical Officer III (Superintendent), Department of the Environment, Northern Ireland.
- John McCormack, Regimental Sergeant Major Instructor, Lothian Battalion, Army Cadet Force.
- Robert Roy Mace, Head Marshman, Askew Trustees, Norfolk.
- James Roulston McGarvey, Constable, Royal Ulster Constabulary.
- Eric Henry McIntyre, General Works Foreman, Vale of White Horse District Council.
- Margaret Mackay, Head Cook, Longmore Hospital, Edinburgh.
- Edward John Mackrell, Club Manager, Naval Canteen Services, Navy, Army and Air Force Institutes.
- Norman Victor McManus, Exhibitions Installation Foreman, Arts Council.
- Frederick Milburn McMorrin, Sergeant, Metropolitan Police.
- Peter McMullen McPake, Underground Worker, Bedlay Colliery, Scottish Area, National Coal Board.
- Alastair James McRoberts, lately Process and General Supervisory Grade "C", HM Naval Base, Devonport, Ministry of Defence.
- Evelyn May McWhirter, Group Collector, Ulster Savings Movement.
- Thornton Wallace Elliott Madge, Technical Officer, London Telecommunications Region, The Post Office.
- Muriel Mahen, National Savings Group Collector, Liverpool.
- John Frederick Mallett, Gas Meter Examiner III, Department of Energy.
- Robert Ben Marsden, Chief Surveyor (Cartographic Surveyor Senior Grade), Ordnance Survey.
- Herbert Marshall, lately Foreman, Osborn Steels Ltd. For Services to Export.
- Kenneth Charles Marshall, Storeman, Royal Naval Armaments Depot, Ernesettle, Devon, Ministry of Defence.
- John Stuart Martin, Telephonist, Headquarters, Royal British Legion.
- Bernard Arthur Masters, Fireman, Merseyside Fire Brigade.
- Eileen Alicia Matthews, Woman Observer, No. 23 Group Durham, Royal Observer Corps.
- Hilda Maughan, National Savings Group Collector, Bishop Auckland.
- Henry Mead, Driver/Operator, Fulwell Garage, London Transport Executive.
- Elizabeth Meakins, Emergency Resident and Night Help, Home Help Service, Somerset County Council.
- George Stanley Merritt, Messenger, Board of Inland Revenue.
- Ernest Mills, Head Caretaker, Western Education and Library Board, Co. Tyrone.
- Leonard Peter Morelli, Driller, David Brown Tractors Ltd.
- Walter John Muir, Foreman, Nuclear Engineering Laboratory, Rolls-Royce & Associates Ltd., Derby.
- Isabel Munro. For services to the community in Evanton, Ross and Cromarty.
- George Mutch, Swimming Instructor, Marlpool Special School, Aberdeen.
- Annie Laura Nicholls, National Savings Group Collector, Bodmin.
- Donald Nicolson, lately Caretaker, Territorial, Auxiliary & Volunteer Reserve Centre, Dunfermline, Ministry of Defence.
- George Henry Norris, lately Coal Deliveryman, Western Fuel Co., Bristol.
- Kenneth Walter Mervyn North, Plumber, HM Prison Wormwood Scrubs.
- Alec Oddy, Senior Vehicle Fitter, Wallace Arnold Tours Ltd.
- Ronald Gordon Ogilvie, Foreman Linesman, North of Scotland Hydro-Electric Board.
- Wesley Orr, Sub-Officer, Fire Authority for Northern Ireland.
- Thomas Frederick Charles Overall. For services to the Blind, particularly to the provision of Guide dogs, in the London area.
- William James Owen, General Foreman, North Mersey District, Merseyside and North Wales Electricity Board.
- George Samuel Page, Head Caretaker/Supervisor, Runcorn Development Corporation.
- Vera Payne, Catering Assistant, Civil Service Catering Organisation, Civil Service Department.
- George Edward Pearce, Governor Technician, Torquay, South Western Region, British Gas Corporation.
- Harry Poloway, Toastmaster for South Wales Area.
- Albert George Poore, Conductor, Southdown Motor Services Ltd.
- George Godfrey Preece. For services to the South Hereford Agricultural Society.
- Ronald Prince, Gas Fitter, Pontefract District, North Eastern Region, British Gas Corporation.
- Sydney Frank Pritchard, lately Pests Operator, Pest Infestation Control Laboratory, Welshpool, Ministry of Agriculture, Fisheries & Food.
- Victoria Marguerite Pryor, Children's Welfare Organiser, Kent (East), Women's Royal Voluntary Service.
- William Edward John Rann, Fireman, Isle of Wight Fire Brigade.
- Victor George Rawson, Sub Officer, London Fire Brigade.
- Dorothy Redfearn, lately Meteorological Auxiliary Station Observer.
- Mary Alice Redfearn, lately Meteorological Auxiliary Station Observer.
- John Riches, Transport Manager, Housing Department, City of Birmingham.
- Alexander Ritchie, Chief Officer Class I, Glenochil Young Offenders Institution.
- George Joseph Henry Roberts, Assistant Chief Photoprinter, Property Services Agency, Department of the Environment.
- Alfred Fyffe Robertson, Nature Study Officer, Camperdown Park, Dundee.
- Joseph Brian Robinson, lately Sergeant, South Yorkshire Police.
- Willie Robinson, Sheet Metal Worker, Royal Ordnance Factory, Leeds, Ministry of Defence.
- William David Roche, Manual Worker, Leyland Cars, Cowley.
- Arthur William Rogers, Head Custodian, Dover Castle, Department of the Environment.
- George Rose, Deputy, Dodworth Colliery, Barnsley Area, National Coal Board.
- William Sandham, Head Foreman Welder, Vickers Ltd. Shipbuilding Group.
- Phyllis Clara Sharrock, School Crossing Patrol, Metropolitan Police Office.
- Francis Gerard Short, Centre Officer, Greater Manchester Branch, British Red Cross Society.
- Peter Simm, Foreman, British Aerospace (B.A.C.), Samlesbury.
- Norman Burnham Simons, lately Craftsman I, Propellants, Explosives & Rocket Motor Establishment, Westcott, Ministry of Defence.
- Doreen Joyce Simpkins, Emergency Services Organiser, Hampshire, Women's Royal Voluntary Service.
- Dynham Sydney Sleeman, Driving Instructor, Esso Petroleum Co. Ltd.
- Lilian Blake Smart, Local Organiser, Porthcawl, Mid Glamorgan, Women's Royal Voluntary Service.
- Gladys Evelyn Snook, Local Organiser, Fairwater, Cardiff, Women's Royal Voluntary Service.
- William John Stanbury, lately General Maintenance Assistant, Blood Group Reference Laboratory, Medical Research Council.
- Laura Elizabeth Ethel Stannard, Foster-mother, Swansea.
- Frederick Stenner, lately Telephonist/Receptionist, Bristol Magistrates' Court.
- Thomas Cowan Steven, Assistant Commandant, Special Constabulary, Lothian and Borders Police.
- Elizabeth Stokes, lately Cleaner, Royal Courts of Justice.
- Amiie Elizabeth Maria Strange. For services to the community in Enfield.
- Donald Stuart, Foster Father, Derbyshire Children's Home, Skegness.
- David Sydney Charles Summer Field. For charitable services in Canterbury.
- James Arthur Swann, Foreman Trades Officer, Northern Ireland Prison Service.
- James Swindells, Process and General Supervisory Grade V, N.A.T.O. Mooring and Support Depot, Fairlie, Ministry of Defence.
- Philip Kenneth Augustus Tedham, Sub-Postmaster, Lamberhurst, Kent, South Eastern Postal Region, The Post Office.
- Harold Thom, Professional and Technology Officer IV, Royal Aircraft Establishment, Aberporth, Ministry of Defence.
- Vera Gilchrist Thompson. For services to the British Red Cross Society in Kent.
- Lilian Gladys Alice Tomkins, Office Keeper Grade I, Department of Industry.
- Stanley Trethewey, lately Mason, Cornwall County Council.
- Frederick John Robert Tritton, Technical Officer, Canterbury Telephone Area, South Eastern Telecommunications Region, The Post Office.
- Michael William Tupper, Senior Foreman of Works, Home Office.
- Frank Albert Tushingham, Specialist Bookbinder, HM Stationery Office.
- James Tyrer, Constable, Merseyside Police.
- Donald John Urquhart, Head Gardener, United. Kingdom Area, Commonwealth War Graves Commission.
- Colin Varley, Chauffeur, Sheepbridge Equipment Ltd.
- Eileen May Varrow. For services to Feltham Sea Cadet Unit.
- Margaret Ward, Senior Messenger, Department of Education & Science.
- Albert George Ware, Works Officer (Industrial Workshops), North Thames Region, British Gas Corporation.
- James Archibald Watkins, Setter, Royal Ordnance Factory, Patricroft, Ministry of Defence.
- Edward Ernest Wayte, Warehouse Foreman, Western British Road Services Ltd.
- Peter Webster, Warrant Officer, City of Hull Squadron, Air Training Corps.
- Edward Alfred Weston, Supervisor, Apprentice Workshop School, British Aerospace (BAC).
- Aubrey Austin Albert White, Distribution Maintenance Superintendent, East Midlands Region, British Gas Corporation.
- Edward Albert White, Chief Paperkeeper, Department of Industry.
- Geoffrey Gerald Whitehouse, Crane Driver, Cookley Works, Welsh Division, British Steel Corporation.
- Maurice Whitehouse, Senior Marker-Out, Herbert Morris Ltd.
- Mary Wigfield, Local Organiser, Langport, Somerset, Women's Royal Voluntary Service.
- David Rees Williams. For services to charity in the Rhymney Valley, Gwent.
- Jessie Williamson, Assistant, Catering Department, Headquarters, Lancashire Constabulary.
- Kenneth Wray, Shop Manager, Catterick Garrison, Navy, Army & Air Force Institute.
- Jack Ernest William Young, lately Sergeant Major Instructor, The Royal Masonic School.

Overseas Territories

- Chan Yiu, Senior Foreman, Railway Department, Hong Kong.
- Cheng Serena Kai-ming, Clerical Officer Class I, Nursing Board, Hong Kong.
- Christopher Hughes Glasgow, Sergeant of Police, Anguilla.
- Albert Hoahanikeni, Inspector of Police, Solomon Islands.
- Lau Cheong-fai, Clerical Officer Class I, Judiciary Department, Hong Kong.
- Donald Mackenzie Lloyd, Principal Lighthouse Keeper, Anguilla.
- Tam Man-yiu, Clerical Officer Class I, Social Welfare Department, Hong Kong.
- Walter Titus Togonu. For services to the community in the Solomon Islands.
- Francis Tunbridge, Test Room Assistant, Electricity Department, Gibraltar.
- Captain Osea Tunidau. For services to the community in the New Hebrides.
- Frederick James Williams, Foreman, Public Works Department, St. Helena.

Australian States

State of New South Wales

- Frank John Ashton. For services to ex-servicemen.
- Archie Philip Austin. For services to the community.
- Francis Donald Brown. For services to ex-servicemen.
- Dorothy Alice Burney. For services to charity.
- Brendan Cox. For services to the community.
- John Henry Davies. For services to the community.
- Keith William Dihm. For services to the community.
- David Downie. For services to sport.
- Ralph Dyer. For services to the State.
- Arthur John Eddy. For services to local government.
- Edith May Flavel. For services to the community.
- The Reverend Archibald Wesley Grant. For services to the community.
- Dennis Allan Green. For services to sport.
- Ross Sutherland Gregor. For services to local government and the community.
- Jessie Holmes. For services to the community.
- James William Clarence Lattimer. For services to the community and ex-servicemen.
- Caroline Jane Leonard (Sister Mary Magdalen). For services to the community.
- Jessie Corbett Mann. For services to the community.
- Joseph Amiel Moses. For services to the community.
- Frank Conrad Norton. For services to sport.
- Jean Frances O'Neill. For services to the community.
- Hazel Jeanne Plant. For services to the arts.
- Robert Oswald Roberts. For services to the community.
- Harold Edwin Sacre. For services to scouting.
- Stanley Roy Slow. For services to the community.
- Julia Twomey (Sister Mary Brenda). For services to the community.
- Flora Ruth Vickers. For services to the community.
- Laurel May Wallace. For services to music.
- William Walsh. For services to the community.
- Stanley Milton Wilson, ED. For services to ex-servicemen.
- Evelyn Percy Wright. For services to agriculture.

State of Victoria

- Lindsay George Caithness, of Williamstown. For services to the community.
- Douglas Campbell, of Elmore. For services to the community.
- Leonard Francis Cotter, of Herne Hill. For public service.
- Edna Mavis Duff, of Geelong. For services to the community.
- Ethel May Fleming, of Canterbury. For services to the community.
- Neville John Gibson, of Mont Albert. For services to the community.
- Herbert John Grigg, of Murtoa. For services to the community and country racing administration.
- John William Hall, of Cohuna. For services to the community.
- Austin Worland Hill, of Lara. For services to the community.
- Agnes Theresa Emily Hilton, of Hopetoun. For services to the community.
- William Walter Hughes, of Fairfield. For services to the community.
- Hannah Hutchinson, of Eaglehawk. For services to the community.
- Robert Crofton Lloyd, of Sandringham. For services to migrants.
- Arthur Edward Lowe, of Kangaroo Flat. For services to the community.
- Alexander Edward Neil, of Stawell. For services to sport.
- Robert Sydney Smith, of Fawkner. For services to the community.
- Evelyn Alice Thompson, of Werribee. For services to the community.
- Kenneth Broughton Watson, of North Carlton. For services to sport.
- Katherine Elizabeth Lillias Ross-Watt, of New Gisborne. For services to the community.
- Thomas Norman Webb, of North Williamstown. For services to youth.
- Michael Weinstein, of Kew. For services to sport.

State of Queensland

- Gladys Mary Bailey, of Oxley. For services to the community.
- Stanley Vincent Baker, of Dalby. For services to sport.
- James Edward Bedford, of Baralaba. For services to the community.
- Myra Joyce Cullen, of Gin Gin. For services to the community.
- William Robert Drevesen, of Manly. For services to the community.
- Margaret Agnes Dunlop, of Corinda. For services to the community.
- Ross Edward Garnett, of New Farm. For services to the community and church organisations.
- Camilo Joseph Giugni, of Ingham. For services to> the community.
- Thomas James Hogan, of North Rockhampton. For services to the community.
- Sydney Hunt Reed Jones, of Mansfield. For services to the community.
- Alice Elizabeth Kopittke, of Banyo. For services to the community.
- Councillor John Percy Martin, of via Forest Hill. For services to local government and the dairying industry.
- David Bruce Nimmo, of Gympie. For outstanding services to the community.
- Florence Elizabeth Sellers, of Bundaberg. For services to the community.
- Esther Sophia Tosh, of via Brigalow. For her services to the community.
- Edna Maud Webber. For services to Longreach Hospital.
- Thomas Raymond Wilbraham, of Gympie. For services to the community.

State of Western Australia

- Esme Edith Andrews, of Subiaco. For services to the community.
- Robert Oswald Bestman, of South Perth. For services to aquatic sports.
- Ena Isabel Burns, of South Perth. For services to the Mentally Incurable Children's Association.
- May Fair, of Pinjarra. For services to Mental Health.
- John Gilchrist Fraser, of Como. For services to the community.
- Thomas Hector Goudie, of Bedford. For services to water sports.
- Edna Patricia Marie Kent, of Subiaco. For services to the community.
- Robert Lee, of Wagin. For services to fire-fighting.
- Samuel Patrick Maher, of East Victoria Park. For services to music.
- Winifred Lydia Mallabone, of Applecross. For services to the community.

=== Royal Red Cross (RRC) ===
Royal Navy

- Sheila Rosemary Phyllis Barton, ARRC, Principal Matron, Queen Alexandra's Royal Naval Nursing Service.

Army

- Colonel Valerie Winifred Cavey, ARRC (388220), Queen Alexandra's Royal Army Nursing Corps.
- Lieutenant Colonel June Christine Hoskins (470229), Queen Alexandra's Royal Army Nursing Corps, Territorial & Army Volunteer Reserve.

Royal Air Force

- Wing Officer Margaret Phyllis Gostling (407279), Princess Mary's Royal Air Force Nursing Service.

==== Associate of the Royal Red Cross (ARRC) ====
Royal Navy

- Chief Medical Technician Anthony Alfred Wingett, M966717T.

Army

- Lieutenant Colonel Cicely Margaret Earp, TD (420513), Queen Alexandra's Royal Army Nursing Corps, Territorial & Army Volunteer Reserve.
- Lieutenant Colonel Jean Veronica Grieve (444021), Queen Alexandra's Royal Army Nursing Corps.
- Major Stella Lily Wilmott Attrill Partridge, TD (475988), Queen Alexandra's Royal Army Nursing Corps, Territorial & Army Volunteer Reserve.

=== Air Force Cross (AFC) ===
Royal Navy

- Lieutenant Commander Peter Richard Sheppard.

Royal Air Force

- Squadron Leader Peter John Gooding (608415).
- Squadron Leader Duncan Arthur Griffiths (608253).
- Squadron Leader Kenneth Raymond Jackson (577221).
- Squadron Leader Anthony John Martin McKeon (4231639).
- Squadron Leader Alan John Sheppard (607969).
- Flight Lieutenant Richard John Henry Fallis (4233406).
- Flight Lieutenant Russell Peart (4233078).
- Flight Lieutenant Gordon Arthur Woolley (4232683).

=== Air Force Medal (AFM) ===
- B3521881 Acting Flight Sergeant David John Jones, Royal Air Force.

=== Queen's Police Medal (QPM) ===
England and Wales

- John Duke, Chief Constable, Hampshire Constabulary.
- Charles Henry Kelly, LLB, Chief Constable, Staffordshire Police.
- James Hilton Brownlow, Deputy Chief Constable, Greater Manchester Police.
- John Barrie Florentine, Deputy Chief Constable, West Mercia Constabulary.
- Donald Smith, Deputy Chief Constable, Avon and Somerset Constabulary.
- Noel Baxter, Commander, Metropolitan Police.
- James Francis Nevill, Commander, Metropolitan Police.
- Philip Anthony Saunders, Commander, Metropolitan Police.
- Leslie Frederick John Walker, Commander, Metropolitan Police.
- Dennis William Fretwell, Chief Superintendent, Warwickshire Constabulary.
- Arthur Edwin Morris, Chief Superintendent, Cheshire Constabulary.
- Roy Avro William Readwin, Chief Superintendent, Nottinghamshire Constabulary.
- Cyril Shillito, Chief Superintendent, West Yorkshire Metropolitan Police.
- Evelyn Mary Unett, Superintendent, West Midlands Police.

Scotland

- Edward Frizzell, Chief Constable, Central Scotland Police.
- James Robertson Binnie, formerly Assistant Chief Constable, Strathclyde Police.

Northern Ireland

- William Godfrey Gordon Pyne, Inspector, Royal Ulster Constabulary.

Jersey

- Edward Cockerham, Chief Officer, States of Jersey Police.

Overseas Territories

- David Austin Chapman, CPM, Chief Superintendent of Police, Royal Hong Kong Police Force.
- Michael Wilton Cheney, CPM, Chief Superintendent of Police, Royal Hong Kong Police Force.
- Beretitara Neeti, Commissioner of Police, Gilbert Islands Police Force.

Australian States

State of New South Wales

- James Joseph Edward Black, Superintendent 3rd Class, New South Wales Police Force.
- George Webster Canacott, Superintendent 2nd Class, New South Wales Police Force.
- Geoffrey Harold Dunn, Superintendent 3rd Class, New South Wales Police Force.
- Harold John Ferris, Superintendent 3rd Class, New South Wales Police Force.
- Sydney Ray Goldsworthy, Superintendent 3rd Class, New South Wales Police Force.
- Neil Connors Hogan, Superintendent 2nd Class, New South Wales Police Force.
- Douglas William John Magee, Superintendent 3rd Class, New South Wales Police Force.
- Gus Marshall, Superintendent 1st Class, New South Wales Police Force.
- George Ernest Peacock, Superintendent 2nd Class, New South Wales Police Force.

State of Victoria

- Cyril George Ainley, Chief Inspector, Victoria Police Force.
- Derek Willoughby Bateman, Chief Inspector, Victoria Police Force.
- Bryan James Crimmins, Superintendent, Victoria Police Force.
- Kenneth Scott Robertson, Inspector, Victoria Police Force.
- Philip Robert Schmidt, Inspector, Victoria Police Force.
- David John Swanson, Assistant Commissioner, Victoria Police Force.
- Keith Pierce Thompson, Inspector, Victoria Police Force.

State of Queensland

- Robert Arnold Muir Freeman, Superintendent, Queensland Police Force.
- Robert Augustine Johnson, Superintendent, Queensland Police Force.

State of Western Australia

- Lionel Claude Hull, Superintendent, Western Australian Police Force.
- Leo Thomas Murphy, Superintendent, Western Australian Police Force.

=== Queen's Fire Services Medal (QFSM) ===
England and Wales

- Charles William Frederick Clisby, Deputy Assistant Chief Officer, London Fire Brigade.
- Reginald Arthur Haley, Chief Fire Officer, Bedfordshire Fire Brigade.
- Thomas Eric Edwards, Chief Fire Officer, Gwynedd Fire Brigade.
- Owen James Hooker, Assistant Chief Fire Officer, Cornwall Fire Brigade.
- Robert Prosser, Assistant Chief Fire Officer, Greater Manchester Fire Brigade.

Australian States

State of Western Australia

- Stanley Cecil Gibbons, Chief Fire Officer, Western Australian Fire Brigades Board.

=== Colonial Police Medal (CPM) ===
- Philip Davies, Superintendent of Police, Royal Hong Kong Police Force.
- Sang Fong, Principal Fireman, Hong Kong Fire Services.
- Windol Harewood, Sergeant, Royal St. Lucia Police Force.
- Yiu-lun Leung, lately Chief Inspector of Police, Royal Hong Kong Police Force.
- Kam-wing Li, Principal Fireman, Hong Kong Fire Services.
- Kwok-choi Li, Divisional Officer, Hong Kong Fire Services.
- Patrick McGowan, Acting Station Sergeant, Royal St. Lucia Police Force.
- Cheuk-yee Ng, lately Superintendent of Police, Royal Hong Kong Auxiliary Police Force.
- Joseph Norris Payne, Chief of Police, Anguilla.
- Hee Pong, Principal Fireman, Hong Kong Fire Services.
- Oliver Norris Philip, Commissioner of Police, Royal Dominica Police Force.
- George Arthur Derek Taylor, Chief Inspector of Police, Bermuda Police Force.
- Jack Trotman, Superintendent of Police, Royal Hong Kong Police Force.
- Bick Wong, Principal Fireman, Hong Kong Fire Services.

=== Queen's Commendation for Valuable Service in the Air ===
Royal Navy

- Lieutenant Rodney Vincent Frederiksen.
- Lieutenant Thomas John Ingram Hooton.

Royal Air Force

- Squadron Leader Cyril Bryan Adcock (608182).
- Squadron Leader Malcolm Noel Caygill (608560).
- Squadron Leader Kenneth Henry (3122318).
- Squadron Leader Cedric William George Hughes (3511632).
- Squadron Leader Peter Adrian Sedgwick (2617870).
- Squadron Leader John Winston Thorpe (4231782).
- Squadron Leader James Robert Wyld (4070093), (Retd).
- Flight Lieutenant Alan Armitage (3136361).
- Flight Lieutenant Martyn Drake Ashton (4231617).
- Flight Lieutenant John Victor Cresswell (685939).
- Flight Lieutenant Charles William Gray (2213653).
- Flight Lieutenant Alan Norman MacGregor (4232083).
- Flight Lieutenant Andrew Renshaw (1960684).
- Flight Lieutenant David Lewis Webley (2619191).
- R0685714 Flight Sergeant James Smeed.
- A8089081 Sergeant David Edward Bellis.

United Kingdom

- Terence Edwin Brand, Captain, Boeing 747 Line, British Airways.
- James Munro Hamilton, Senior Base Training Captain, Trident 1 and 2, British Airways.
- Percy Alec Mackenzie, DSO, DFC, Captain, Flight Operations Director, British Caledonian Airways Ltd.
- James Henry Summerlee, Captain, Deputy Manager, Penzance/Isles of Scilly, British Airways Helicopters Ltd.

== Australia ==
=== Knight Bachelor ===
- Alan Thomas Carmody, CBE, of Red Hill, Australian Capital Territory. For distinguished public service.
- John Patrick Cass, OBE, of Crowther, New South Wales. For distinguished service to the rural industry and as chairman of the Australian Wheat Board.
- Thomas John Noel Foley, CBE, of Blakehurst, New South Wales. For distinguished service to industry.
- Professor John Loewenthal, CMG, ED, of via Bowral, New South Wales. For distinguished service to health.
- Arvi Hillar Parbo, of Vermont South, Victoria. For service to Industry.
- Edward Fergus Sidney Roberts, CBE, of Hamilton, Queensland. For distinguished service to primary industry.

=== Order of Saint Michael and Saint George ===
==== Knight Commander of the Order of St Michael and St George (KCMG) ====
- Senator The Honourable Robert Carrington Cotton, of Oberon, New South Wales. For distinguished public and parliamentary service.
- The Right Honourable Billy Mackie Snedden, QC, MP, of Ringwood, Victoria. For distinguished public and parliamentary service.

==== Companion of the Order of St Michael and St George (CMG) ====
- The Honourable James Francis Cope, of Sans Souci, New South Wales. For parliamentary service.
- The Honourable Dr. Alexander James Forbes, MC, of Walkerville, South Australia. For parliamentary service.

=== Order of the British Empire ===
==== Dame Commander of the Order of the British Empire (DBE) ====
Civil Division

- Mary Durack, OBE, (Mrs. H. C. Miller), of Nedlands, Western Australia. For distinguished service to literature.
- Audrey Tattie Hinchliffe Reader, OBE, of Chadstone, Victoria. For distinguished service to women's affairs and to politics.

==== Knight Commander of the Order of the British Empire (KBE) ====
Military Division

- General Arthur Leslie MacDonald, CB, OBE, Chief of Defence Force Staff.

Civil Division

- Walter Russell Crocker, CBE, of Glen-Osmond, South Australia. For distinguished public service.
- His Excellency The Honourable Gordon Freeth, Australian High Commission, London. For distinguished public and parliamentary service.

==== Commander of the Order of the British Empire (CBE) ====
Civil Division

- Neil Smith Currie, OBE, of Forrest, A.C.T. For public service to industry and commerce.
- Robert Broughton Lansdown, of Red Hill, A.C.T. For public service to housing, the environment and community development.
- Douglas Henry McKay, OBE, of Campbell, A.C.T. For public service to overseas trade.
- Dr. Albert Lloyd George Rees, of North Balwyn, Victoria. For service to the science of chemical physics.
- Reginald de Quetteville Robin, of Canterbury, Victoria. For service to Australian shipping.
- Howard Austin Soloman, of Cottesloe, Western Australia. For community service.
- Dr. Haydn Stanley Williams, of Manning, Western Australia. For service to education.
- Dr. Howard Knox Worner, of North Balwyn, Victoria. For service to science and the technology of energy.

==== Officer of the Order of the British Empire (OBE) ====
Civil Division

- James Sydney Adams, of Tranmere, South Australia. For service to defence science.
- James Rupert Allen, of Mortlake, Victoria. For service to primary industry.
- The Reverend Frederick James Angus, of Geelong, Victoria. For service to marriage guidance and disabled people.
- Anthony Brown Armstrong, of North Kew, Victoria. For advisory service to defence work.
- Colin Arthur Keith Edward Austin, of Loganlea, Queensland. For public service to commonwealth construction.
- Frederick William Cecil Bennett, of Denistone, New South Wales. For service to cricket and baseball.
- Alfred Hamilton Dale Budd, of Yarralumla, A.C.T. For service as principal private secretary to the Prime Minister.
- John Douglas, of Kootingal, New South Wales. For service to egg marketing.
- Dr. Cyril Percival Victorious Evans, of Hawker, A.C.T. For public service to health.
- Persia Elspbeth, Lady Galleghan, of Cremorne, New South Wales. For service to the Red Cross and the community.
- Nancy Giese, MBE, of Darwin, Northern Territory. For service to education the arts and women.
- Jack Noel Goodwin, of West Beach, South Australia. For service to industry, philanthropy and sport.
- Edgar Clive Harcourt, of Vaucluse, New South Wales. For service to overseas telecommunications.
- Esther Lipman, Lady Jacobs, MBE, of Leabrook, South Australia. For service to local government and to the community.
- John Patrick Lonergan, of Deakin, A.C.T. For public service to science.
- Harold Thomas Loxton, of East Kew, Victoria. For public services to road engineering.
- Donald Martin, of Hobart, Tasmania. For scientific service to the apple industry.
- Dr. Spiro Moraitis, of East St. Kilda, Victoria. For service to migrants and their health.
- Bernard James O'Connor, of Sans Souci, New South Wales. For service to the stevedoring industry.
- Desmond James O'Connor, of Pearce, A.C.T. For public service to productivity.
- George Reynolds Rippon, of Poolayelo, Victoria. For service to local government, sport and to the media.
- Dick (Goobalathaldin) Roughsey, of Morriagton Island, Queensland. For service to Aboriginal art and culture.
- Neale Esmond Joseph Sainsbury, of Griffith, A.C.T. For public service to the law.
- Joyce Eileen Shewcroft, of Avalon Beach, New South Wales. For service to the ABC and law.
- Thomas Bevan Wallace, of Beauty Point, New South Wales. For advisory service in advertising.
- Donald Vivian Youngman, of Griffith, A.C.T. For public service in statistics.

==== Member of the Order of the British Empire (MBE) ====
Military Division

Royal Australian Navy

- Lieutenant Commander (Cadets) Alfred Cunneen.
- Lieutenant Algirdas Petros Diciunas (O.42167).
- Lieutenant Commander Peter William Horobin (O.1873).

Royal Australian Military Forces

- Captain Peter John Balzary (33668), Royal Australian Infantry.
- Major Alan Frank Batchelor (41017), Royal Australian Engineers.
- Chaplain 2nd Class Joseph Roy Bedford (290192), Royal Australian Army Chaplains' Department.
- Major Sidney Norman Penhaligon (24168), Royal Australian Artillery.
- Major Clement Francis Richards, ED (545825), Royal Australian Artillery (Australian Citizen Military Forces).
- Major Donald George Swiney (53711), Royal Australian Survey.

Royal Australian Air Force

- Flight Lieutenant Robert John Coopes (061815).
- Squadron Leader Brian John Marriott (0218391).
- Squadron Leader Raymond John Stevenson (014417).
- Flying Officer Ronald William Tyler (019026).

Civil Division

- Ronald William Beaver, of Red Hill, A.C.T. For public service to defence.
- Graeme Emerson Bell, of Waverley, New South Wales. For service to jazz music.
- Carlo Antonio Boscaini, of Darwin, Northern Territory. For service to migrants.
- John Patrick Brophy, of Floreat Park, Western Australia. For public service to science.
- David McKindlay Burgess, of Nunawading, Victoria. For service to youth and disabled people.
- David Burramarra Bukulatjpi, of Elcho Island. For service to Aboriginals on Elcho Island, Northern Territory.
- Andrew John Egan Campbell, of Elsternwick, Victoria.
- Joan Ruth Campbell, of Scarborough, Western Australia. For service to the art of pottery.
- Jean Athola Conochie, of East Melbourne, Victoria. For public service to science.
- John Burton Dearlove, of Northgate, Queensland. For service to life saving.
- Leo Demant, of St. Ives, New South Wales. For service to music.
- (Bonnie) Sarah Buchanan Dillon, of Darling Point, New South Wales. For service to health.
- Archibald Norman Durham, of Chapel Hill, Queensland. For public service to veterans and service to sport.
- William Keran Fraser, of Greenwich, New South Wales. For service with the ABC News.
- Alan Charles Hamlyn Frost, of Cooma North, New South Wales. For public service in the Snowy Mountains.
- James Douglas Gallagher, of Darwin, Northern Territory. For service to education.
- Douglas Carling Green, of Lenah Valley, Tasmania. For service to cricket and football and veterans' welfare.
- Millicent Kate Harry, of Launceston, Tasmania. For service to temperance and the church.
- Dr. Annie Doreen Hensley, (Mrs. Mune), of Mundulla, South Australia. For service to health.
- Robert Russell Hollick, of Mildura, Victoria. For service to the wine industry.
- Mary Lindsay Houghton, of Devonport, Tasmania. For service to the theatre.
- Albert William, Jennings, of Clayton, Victoria. For public service to posts and telecommunications.
- The Reverend Albert Richard Jones, of Royston Park, South Australia. For service to the church and social welfare.
- Paul David Kahl, of Wee Waa, New South Wales. For service to the cotton industry.
- Marjorie Patricia Lance, of Torrens, A.C.T. For public service.
- Thomas Crede Lovegrove, of Darwin Northern Territory. For public service to Aboriginals.
- Donald Wilson McEwan, of Richmond, New South Wales. For service to veterans' welfare and the citrus industry.
- Eric George McRae, of Sandy Bay, Tasmania. For service to sport and conservation.
- Rosario (Ross) Maniaci, of Chiswick, New South Wales. For service to migrants and to local government.
- Jean Maree Councillor Manuel, of Como, New South Wales. For service to local government and to the community.
- Benjamin Wongathauoo Mason, of Kalgoorlie, Western Australia. For service to Aboriginals.
- Jack Mead, of Wembley, Western Australia. For public service and service to youth.
- Kenneth Archibald Metcalfe, of Lockleys, South Australia. For public service to defence science and technology.
- Jacob George Mye. For service to Torres Strait Islanders.
- Brother John Anselm O'Neill, of Launceston, Tasmania. For service to education.
- William Jack Percival, of Lindfield, New South Wales. For service to journalism.
- Lewis Peter Potter, of Claremont, Western Australian. For service to disabled people.
- David Arthur Powell, of Christmas Island, Indian Ocean. For service to conservation.
- Marjorie Evelyn (Eve) Pownall, of Forestville, New South Wales. For service to literature.
- Frank James Roberts, of Griffith, A.C.T. For public service in printing.
- Lou Rose, of Middle Cove, New South Wales. For service to the Jewish community and to sport.
- William Charles Rowe, Australian Consulate, Honolulu, Hawaii.
- James Carlyle Smith, of Brookfield, Queensland. For service to the honey industry.
- Sister Mary Stephen (Miss Judith Mary Carney), of Gunnedah, New South Wales. For service to education.
- Richard John Treister, of Parramatta, New South Wales. For service to migrants.
- Telka Alathea Williams, of Alice Springs, Northern Territory. For service to youth, disabled people and the Red Cross.
- Donald Arthur Winch, of North Balwyn, Victoria. For public service to the airline industry.

=== Companion of the Imperial Service Order (ISO) ===
- Pauline Fanning, MBE, Chief Librarian, Australian Reference, National Library of Australia.
- Leo Thomas Fitzgerald, Deputy Commissioner of Taxation.
- Joseph Martin, Assistant Secretary, Department of Transport.

=== British Empire Medal (BEM) ===
Military Division

Royal Australian Navy

- Chief Petty Officer Neil Maxwell Churches (R52376).
- Chief Petty Officer Douglas Graham Sutherland (R55567).

Royal Australian Military Forces

- Corporal John Bruno (448443), Royal Australian Infantry.
- Staff Sergeant Luigi Finzi (37341), Royal Australian Army Ordnance Corps.
- Sergeant Mervyn Holland (17594), Royal Australian Infantry.
- Staff Sergeant George Ots (213030), Royal Australian Signals.
- Staff Sergeant Arthur Ernest Penfold (2128622), Royal Australian Infantry (Australian Citizen Military Forces).
- Staff Sergeant Raymond George Perks (216085), Royal Australian Army Ordnance Corps.

Royal Australian Air Force

- Flight Sergeant Colin Thomas Etherden (A110798).
- Sergeant Norman Sydney King (A11239).
- Sergeant Carl William Randall (A221423).
- Flight Sergeant Robert Edward Smith (A221878).

Civil Division

- Richard Algate, of Broken Hill, New South Wales. For service to charities.
- Keith Albert Axelby, of Lyons, A.C.T. For public service as a gardener.
- Albert Edward Bannear, of Saddleworth, South Australia. For public service and service in civil defence.
- Marjorie Winifred Bates, of Rivett, A.C.T. For public service.
- Ian Henry Berresford, of Howrah, Tasmania. For public service to the airline industry and for service to youth choristers.
- Elsie May Blacket, of Orange, New South Wales. For service to the Orange field day.
- Edward William Brill, of Harbord, New South Wales. For public service as a car driver.
- Ronald William Butler, of Ainslie, A.C.T. For public transport service.
- Margaret Elaine Caldow, of Doncaster, Victoria. For service to netball.
- William Rudge Capp, of Barton, A.C.T. For public service in statistics.
- Janet Ann Christie, of Chatswood, New South Wales. For service to youth.
- Lorna Evelyn Clarke, of Glenelg East, South Australia. For public service in the Passports Office.
- Francis Charles Geoffrey Coughlin, of Hampton, Victoria. For public service in technology.
- Sydney (Don) Featherstone, of Toowoomba, Queensland. For service to cinephotography.
- Peter Bernard Ferrall, of Mowbray, Tasmania. For service to the disadvantaged.
- Margaret Cecily Ferrett, of Old Koreelah, New South Wales. For service as non-official postmistress.
- Michael John Flanagan, of Wavell Heights, Queensland. For public service as a car driver.
- Patricia Flynn, of Mosman, New South Wales. For service to swimming education.
- Thomas Joseph Hardiman, of Bunbury, Western Australia. For public service in customs.
- Pearl Mary Hickey, of Putney, New South Wales. For community service.
- Harold Ernest Mervyn Hutchison, of Westmead, New South Wales. For service to veterans' welfare.
- Beryl Elizabeth Johnson, of Leura, New South Wales. For service to the Red Cross and Golf.
- Harold James J0Lliffe, of Alice Springs, Northern Territory. For public service in construction.
- The Reverend Father Patrick Peter Kelly, of Kingscote, South Australia. For service to the church.
- Ralph Haynes Lewis, of Braddon, A.C.T. For service to the church and youth.
- Ted Geoffrey Loban, of Thursday Island, Queensland. For service to the Torres Strait Islanders.
- Colin Whitmore Joseph Logan, of Ipswich, Queensland. For service to disabled people and to local government.
- Alfred Charles Sherman McGinty, of Mount Gravatt, Queensland. For public service in surveying.
- Lucy May McKay, of Oaklands, New South Wales. For service to education.
- Keith McKenzie, of Mudgee, New South Wales. For service to the Bush Fire Brigade and to the aged.
- Isabelle. Macleod, of Bomaderry, New South Wales. For service to Aboriginal culture.
- Richard Moore, of Netherby, South Australia. For service to children and disabled people.
- The Reverend Father Nicholaos Moutafis, of East Oakleigh, Victoria. For service to the church and migrants.
- John Francis Murphy, of Bellevue Hill, New South Wales. For public service in air traffic control.
- Marjorie Eileen Nelson, of Hawthorn, Victoria. For service to softball and hockey.
- May Lorna O'Brien, of Bassendean, Western Australia. For service to Aboriginal education.
- Mary Stewart Pain, of Rockhampton, Queensland. For service to health.
- Clement Riggs, of Montello, Tasmania. For public service.
- Frank Wilford Roberts, of Quorn, South Australia. For service to health and local governments.
- Eric William Alfred Sargeant, of Bathurst,-New South Wales. For service to health and to golf.
- Isobel May (Mysie) Schenk, of Esperance, Western Australia. For service to Aboriginals.
- Eric Stanley Smith, of Pascoe Vale South, Victoria. For public service in photography.
- Francis Stanley Terry, of Balcatta, Western Australia. For public service to veterans.
- Irvine John Thompson, of Bowral, New South Wales. For service to cricket and horticulture.
- Margaret Trickett, of Narara, New South Wales. For service to pipe bands.
- Maxwell Walter Turner, Lilli Pilli, New South Wales. For service to the community.
- Samuel Wallace Watson, of Mansfield, Queensland. For service to Aboriginals.
- Nancy Jean Young, of Port Augusta, South Australia. For service to health.

=== Royal Red Cross (RRC) ===
==== Associate of the Royal Red Cross (ARRC) ====
- Major Ruth Mary Page (F2S228), Royal Australian Army Nursing Corps.
- Lieutenant Colonel Janet Elizabeth Studholme (F25135), Royal Australian Army Nursing Corps.

=== Air Force Cross (AFC) ===
Royal Australian Air Force

- Squadron Leader Trevor Robert Etheridge (0221476).
- Squadron Leader Stafford Thomas James (0221373).

=== Queen's Police Medal (QPM) ===
- Raymond John McCabe, BEM, Superintendent, Commonwealth Police Force.
- Joseph Gerard Medwin, Superintendent, A.C.T. Police Force.
- John Daniel Reilly, Superintendent, Commonwealth Police Force.

=== Queen's Fire Services Medal (QFSM) ===
- Vivian Arthur Rigby, of Aspley, Queensland. Formerly Regional Fire Officer, Department of Transport.

== Mauritius ==
=== Knight Bachelor ===
- William Henry Garrioch, Chief Justice.

=== Order of the British Empire ===
==== Commander of the Order of the British Empire (CBE) ====
Civil Division

- Jugmohunsing Fulena, QPM, CPM, MPM, Commissioner of Police.
- Rameshwar Jaypal. For political and public service.

==== Officer of the Order of the British Empire (OBE) ====
Civil Division

- Baboo Kresoonpersadsingh Ramdour. For services to the co-operative movement and for voluntary social work.

==== Member of the Order of the British Empire (MBE) ====
Civil Division

- Louis Roland Patrick Angseesing, lately Senior Inspector of Schools.
- Hurreecharun Boodan. For services to local government and voluntary social work.
- Hurrydeo Choolun, lately General Manager, Tobacco Board.
- Nagamootoo Curthan, Member, Industrial Relations Commission.
- Jean Marie Arthur Maurice, lately Chief Health Inspector, Ministry of Health.
- Cassam Ramdin, recently Senior Auditor.

=== Queen's Police Medal (QPM) ===
- Atwaroosing Rajarai, MPM, Deputy Commissioner, Mauritius Police Force.

=== Mauritius Police Medal (MPM) ===
- Dhunpathlall Bhima, BEM, Assistant Superintendent, Mauritius Police Force.
- Bhardwoze Juggernauth, Assistant Commissioner, Mauritius Police Force.
- Abdool Raouf Sookia, Assistant Superintendent, Mauritius Police Force.
- Marcel Tadebois, Assistant Commissioner, Mauritius Police Force.
- Marie Serge Ivo Turenne, Assistant Superintendent, Mauritius Police Force.

== Fiji ==
=== Order of the British Empire ===
==== Officer of the Order of the British Empire (OBE) ====
Military Division

- Commander Stanley Branson Brown, MBE, VRD, Royal Fiji Military Forces Naval Squadron.

Civil Division

- Ganga Ram, JP, Medical Officer of Health, Suva.
- Meloma Tui Savai-Lu'u Sanerive, Government Printer.

==== Member of the Order of the British Empire (MBE) ====
Civil Division

- Wilfred Waring Bentley. For services to the community.
- Tulia Koroi. For services to education and the community.
- Sakeasi Koroinailovolovo Sovanivalu. For services to education and the community.

=== British Empire Medal (BEM) ===
Military Division

- Staff Sergeant/Temporary Warrant Officer Class 2, Isoa Bainimoli Makutu, 2nd Battalion, Fiji Infantry Regiment (Territorial Force).

== Bahamas ==
=== Order of Saint Michael and Saint George ===
==== Companion of the Order of St Michael and St George (CMG) ====
- Salathiel Harvey Thompson, MVO, QPM, CPM, Commissioner of Police.

=== British Empire Medal (BEM) ===
Civil Division

- Benjamin Cox. For services to the community.

== Grenada ==
=== Order of the British Empire ===
==== Commander of the Order of the British Empire (CBE) ====
Civil Division

- William Lennox Slinger. For philanthropy and services to the community.

==== Officer of the Order of the British Empire (OBE) ====
Civil Division

- Vivian Oswald Williams. For public service.

==== Member of the Order of the British Empire (MBE) ====
Civil Division

- Benjamin Solomon Coy. For public service.

=== Companion of the Imperial Service Order (ISO) ===
- Elma Louise Thorne, Chief Personnel Officer.

=== British Empire Medal (BEM) ===
Civil Division

- Donald Andrew Pierre. For services to sport.

=== Queen's Police Medal (QPM) ===
- Nellie Cecilia Veronica Munro, Assistant Superintendent, Grenada Police Force.

== Papua New Guinea ==
=== Order of the British Empire ===
==== Knight Commander of the Order of the British Empire (KBE) ====
Civil Division

- Colonel Jack Keith Murray, OBE, ED. For distinguished service to Papua New Guinea.

==== Commander of the Order of the British Empire (CBE) ====
Civil Division

- The Reverend Bernard Franke. For long and distinguished service to the church.
- The Honourable Mr. Justice James Boyd Keith Williams. For distinguished service to the law.

==== Officer of the Order of the British Empire (OBE) ====
Military Division

- Colonel Anthony Thomas Hall (335041), Papua New Guinea Defence Force.
- Lieutenant Colonel Gago Mapokai Mamae (82960), Papua New Guinea Defence Force.
- Lieutenant Colonel Rex Rowe (34812), Papua New Guinea Defence Force.

Civil Division

- James Jacobi. For services to sport and the community.
- John Maxwell Middleton. For political and community services.

==== Member of the Order of the British Empire (MBE) ====
Military Division

- Major (Provisional Lieutenant Colonel) Thomas Poang (83013), Papua New Guinea Defence Force.
- Warrant Officer Class 2 Geoffrey John Wildblood (120036), Papua New Guinea Defence Force.

Civil Division

- Harry Hans Jackman. For services to cooperatives and business development.
- Anna Nombri. For services to the community.
- Timothy Pohai. For services to the community.

=== Companion of the Imperial Service Order (ISO) ===
- John Desmond Fitzer. Deputy Provincial Commissioner, Central Province.

=== British Empire Medal (BEM) ===
Military Division

- Corporal Raphael Perry Wahanduo (85896), Papua New Guinea Defence Force.

Civil Division

- Ellen Dawn Birchley. For services to the National Court.
- Lasi Daku. For services to public health.
- Daun. Senior Sergeant, Royal Papua New Guinea Constabulary.
- Kelekele. Senior Sergeant, Royal Papua New Guinea Constabulary.
- Laiku Sii. For services to the National Court.
