= 1989 Birthday Honours =

British government recognitions

Queen's Birthday Honours are announced on or around the date of the Queen's Official Birthday in Australia, Canada, New Zealand and the United Kingdom. The dates vary, both from year to year and from country to country. All are published in supplements to the London Gazette and many are formally conferred by the monarch (or her representative) some time after the date of the announcement, particularly for those service people on active duty.

The 1989 Queen's Birthday honours lists were announced on 16 June 1989.

Recipients of honours are displayed here as they were styled before their new honours.

== United Kingdom ==
=== Life Peer ===
==== Baron ====
- Professor Ian McColl, Director of Surgical Unit, Guy's Hospital. Member, Council, Royal College of Surgeons.
- Sir Eric Sharp, C.B.E., Chairman and Chief Executive, Cable & Wireless plc
- Sir John (Nicholas) Walton, T.D., Member and former President, General Medical Council.

=== Privy Counsellor ===
- Christopher Francis Patten, M.P., Minister of State Foreign and Commonwealth Office; Member of Parliament, Bath.
- Nicholas Paul Scott, M.B.E., M.P., Minister of State, Department of Social Security; Member of Parliament, Chelsea.

=== Knight Bachelor ===
- Nigel Frederick Althaus, Government Broker.
- Bryan Askew, Chairman, Yorkshire Regional Health Authority.
- John Alexander Carter. For political and public service.
- Frederick Brian Corby, Chief Executive and Director, Prudential Corporation plc.
- Barry Albert Cross, C.B.E. For services to Animal Physiology and Genetics.
- Robert James Davidson, Managing Director, GEC Power Systems Ltd.
- John Ferguson (Ian) Denholm, C.B.E., Chairman, J & J Denholm Ltd; lately President, General Council of British Shipping.
- Victor William Michael Drury, O.B.E., Professor of General Practice, University of Birmingham. Lately President, Royal College of General Practitioners.
- Horace William Alexander Francis, C.B.E., lately President, Institution of Civil Engineers.
- Richard Kennedy Harvey Gaskell, President, The Law Society.
- Jayvantsinhji Kayaji Gohel, C.B.E. For political and public service.
- Simon Alexander Gourlay, President, National Farmers' Union.
- Rex (Reginald Carey) Harrison, Actor.
- Denys Hartley Henderson, Chairman, ICI plc.
- John Leonard Hunt, M.P. For political service.
- Horace Kadoorie, C.B.E. For services to British Gurkha interests in Nepal.
- Richard Marchant Knowles, Leader, Birmingham City Council.
- Peter Hugh Jefferd Lloyd-Jones, Professor of Greek, University of Oxford.
- Hugh Roderick Macleod, Chairman, Lloyd's Register of Shipping.
- John Manduell, C.B.E., Principal, Royal Northern College of Music.
- Patrick Michael Ernest David McNair-Wilson, M.P. For political service.
- Peter Colin Michael, C.B.E., Chairman, UEI plc.
- David Nicholas, C.B.E., Chairman, Independent Television News.
- Leonard Harry Peach, lately Chief Executive, National Health Service Management Board.
- John Tavare, C.B.E., Chairman, Mersey Basin Campaign.
- Cyril Julian Hebden Taylor. For services to Education.
- Michael Goodiff Taylor, C.B.E. For political and public service.
- Charles Henderson Tidbury, D.L., Chairman, William and Mary Tercentenary Trust.
- Aubrey Fiennes Trotman-Dickenson, Principal, University of Wales, College of Cardiff.
- Robert Wilson, C.B.E., Perren Professor of Astronomy and Head of Department of Physics and Astronomy, University College, London.
- John Woodcock, C.B.E., Q.P.M., H.M. Inspector of Constabulary, Wales and Midlands.
- Gerhard Jacob (Jack) Zunz, lately Joint Chairman, Ove Arup Partnership.

=== Order of the Bath ===
==== Knight Grand Cross of the Order of the Bath (GCB) ====
- Sir Antony Derek Maxwell Oulton, K.C.B., Q.C., Permanent Secretary, Lord Chancellor's Department.

==== Knight Commander of the Order of the Bath (KCB) ====
Military Division

Royal Navy

- Vice Admiral Brian Thomas Brown, C.B.E.
- Vice Admiral Michael Howard Livesay.

Army

- Lieutenant General John Hartley Learmont, C.B.E., Colonel Commandant Royal Regiment of Artillery, Colonel Commandant Army Air Corps.
- Lieutenant General Anthony Richard Guy Mullens, O.B.E., late 4th/7th Royal Dragoon Guards.

Royal Air Force

- Air Marshal Michael James Graydon, C.B.E., Royal Air Force.
- Air Marshal Roger Hewlett Palin, O.B.E., Royal Air Force
- Air Marshal Michael George Simmons, C.B., A.F.C., Royal Air Force.

Civil Division

- (Constant Hendrik) Henry de Waal, C.B., Q.C., First Parliamentary Counsellor, Office of the Parliamentary Counsel.
- Geoffrey Holland, C.B., Permanent Secretary, Department of Employment.

==== Companion of the Order of the Bath (CB) ====
Military Division

- Rear Admiral Peter Francis Grenier.
- Rear Admiral Robert Arthur Isaac.
- Major General Nicholas Francis Vaux, D.S.O.
- Major General John Alan Maurice Evans, late Corps of Royal Engineers.
- Major General George Malcolm Hutchinson, late Corps of Royal Electrical and Mechanical Engineers.
- Major General Peter Walter Ernest Istead, O.B.E., G.M., Colonel Commandant Royal Army Ordnance Corps.
- Major General Charles Alexander Ramsay, O.B.E., late The Royal Scots Dragoon Guards (Carabiniers and Greys).
- Major General James Robert Templer, O.B.E., late Royal Regiment of Artillery.
- Air Vice-Marshal Robert James Michael Alcock, Royal Air Force.
- Air Vice-Marshal Graham Neil Forman, Royal Air Force.
- Air Vice-Marshal Anthony Arthur George Woodford, Royal Air Force.

Civil Division

- Alan Henry Bishop, Grade 3, Scottish Office.
- Ann Elizabeth, Mrs Bowtell, Deputy Secretary, Department of Social Security.
- Cyril Duncan Burgess, E.R.D., Director, Hazardous Substances Division, Health and Safety Executive.
- Philip John Cooper, Comptroller-General, Patent Office.
- Michael John Fairey, Deputy Secretary, Department of Health.
- David Stewart Gandy, O.B.E., Deputy Director, Public Prosecutions, Crown Prosecution Service.
- John Bryan Jefferson, C.B.E., Director General, Design Services, Property Services Agency, Department of the Environment.
- Alastair John Peter Macdonald, Deputy Secretary, Department of Trade and Industry.
- Ronald Kinsman Miller, Solicitor, Board of Inland Revenue.
- David Alan Nicholls, C.M.G., Deputy Under Secretary of State, Ministry of Defence.
- John Allan Patterson, Director, Department for National Savings.
- Gerald Hayden Phillips, Deputy Secretary, H.M. Treasury.
- David William Saunders, Parliamentary Counsellor, Office of the Parliamentary Counsel.
- William Albert Watson, Grade 3, Ministry of Agriculture, Fisheries and Food.

=== Order of St Michael and St George ===
==== Knight Grand Cross of the Order of St Michael and St George (GCMG) ====
- Sir Patrick Wright, K.C.M.G., Permanent Under-Secretary of State, Foreign and Commonwealth Office, and Head of Her Majesty's Diplomatic Service.

==== Knight Commander of the Order of St Michael and St George (KCMG) ====
- Timothy Lewis Achilles Daunt, C.M.G., H.M. Ambassador, Ankara.
- Richard Trevor Langford Francis, Director-General, British Council.
- John Albert Leigh Morgan, C.M.G., H.M. Ambassador, Mexico City.

==== Companion of the Order of St Michael and St George (CMG) ====
- James Steven Bell, C.B.E., D.F.C., Q.P.M. For services to British interests in Bahrain.
- Gerald Edmondson Clark, United Kingdom Permanent Representative to the U.N., Vienna.
- John Coates Edwards, British High Commissioner, Maseru.
- William Hugh Fullerton, Governor of the Falkland Islands.
- James Ronald Gass, lately Director for Manpower, Social Affairs and Education, O.E.C.D., Paris.
- John Wilkings Hackett, lately Director for Financial, Fiscal and Enterprise Affairs, O.E.C.D., Paris.
- Michael Edward Howell, O.B.E., British High Commissioner, Port Moresby.
- Patrick Michael Nixon, O.B.E., H.M. Ambassador, Doha.
- Allan John Ramsay, H.M. Ambassador, Beirut.
- John Alan Shepherd, H.M. Ambassador, Bahrain.
- Duncan Stuart, lately Counsellor, H.M. Embassy, Washington.
- Jeremy Richard Levering Grosvenor Varcoe, lately H.M. Ambassador, Mogadishu.

=== Royal Victorian Order ===
==== Dame Commander of the Royal Victorian Order (DCVO) ====
- Elizabeth, Lady Basset, C.V.O.

==== Knight Commander of the Royal Victorian Order (KCVO) ====
- Edwin Hardy Amies, C.V.O.
- Major Shane Gabriel Basil Blewitt, C.V.O.
- Robert Fellowes, C.B., L.V.O.
- Charles Mortimer Tollemache Smith-Ryland.

==== Commander of the Royal Victorian Order (CVO) ====
- Professor Norman James Blacklock, L.V.O., O.B.E.
- Gordon Herbert Franklin, L.V.O.
- Group Captain Jeremy Frederick Billings Jones, A.D.C., Royal Air Force.
- Hartland Molson MacDougall, C.M.
- Dr John Duncan Matthews.
- Donald Ian Scleater, L.V.O.
- Commander Charles William Stuart Shears, O.B.E., R.N. (Ret'd.).
- The Honourable Geoffrey Hazlitt Wilson.

==== Lieutenant of the Royal Victorian Order (LVO) ====
- Lieutenant Colonel Peter Evan Wyldbore Gibbs.
- Edward Charles Joslin.
- Reverend John Herbert Williams.
- Major Eldred William O'Flaherty Wilson, D.S.O.

==== Member of the Royal Victorian Order (MVO) ====
- Brian Ames.
- Patricia Tempe, Mrs Behr, M.B.E.
- Valerie Moreton, Mrs Bennett-Levy.
- Sheila Loraine, Lady de Bellaigue.
- James Robert Holme.
- Miss Robin Isobel Rawson.
- Anthony Wilkie.

==== Bar to the Royal Victorian Medal (Silver) (RVM) ====
- Petty Officer Joseph James Croft, R.V.M., Royal Navy.

==== Royal Victorian Medal (Silver) (RVM) ====
- Chief Technician Brian John Beach, Royal Air Force.
- Ralph Burn.
- Charge Chief Marine Engineering Artificer (Propulsion) Edward Alfred Gilbert Coleman, Royal Navy.
- Charles Duncan Davidson.
- Thomas Edgar Deighton.
- Cyril John Eagle.
- Divisional Sergeant Major Frederick Hardy, B.E.M., The Queen's Body Guard of the Yeoman of the Guard.
- Richard Charles Hawkins.
- Douglas James Jones.
- Gwynne Jones.
- Chief Technician Malcolm Langford, Royal Air Force.
- William Edward Martin.
- Chief Petty Officer (Seaman) Malcolm Thomas Nisbet, Royal Navy.
- Denis John Nutley.
- Chief Communications Yeoman David James Pritchard, Royal Navy.
- Ashley John Sadler.
- Leonard James Shelton.
- Police Constable Thomas Spink, Metropolitan Police.

=== Order of the British Empire ===
==== Knight Grand Cross of the Order of the British Empire (GBE) ====
- Admiral Sir John Woodward, K.C.B.

==== Dame Commander of the Order of the British Empire (DBE) ====
- Elsie Rosemary, Mrs Rue, C.B.E., former Regional General Manager and Regional Medical Officer, Oxford Regional Health Authority.

==== Knight Commander of the Order of the British Empire (KBE) ====
- Vice Admiral Alan Grose.
- Rear Admiral (now Vice Admiral) James Lamb Weatherall.
- The Reverend Professor Henry Chadwick, Master of Peterhouse, Cambridge.
- Piers Jacobs, O.B.E., Financial Secretary, Hong Kong.
- Terence George Streeton, C.M.G., M.B.E., British High Commissioner, Dhaka.

==== Commander of the Order of the British Empire (CBE) ====
Military Division

Royal Navy

- Commodore Anthony Dennis Barrett, R.D.**, Royal Naval Reserve.
- The Right Reverend Monsignor William Ronald Brown, Royal Navy.
- Surgeon Commodore Raymond Radford
- Captain John Francis Scott Trinder, Royal Navy.
- Captain Brian Vincent Woodford, Royal Navy.

Army

- Brigadier Robert John Hayman-Joyce, O.B.E. (474714), late The Royal Hussars (Prince of Wales's Own)
- Colonel Norman Stephen Nash (468708), Army Catering Corps.
- Brigadier Shirley Patricia Nield, A.D.C. (450671), Women's Royal Army Corps.
- Brigadier Thomas Hugh Robinson (482348), Royal Army Chaplains' Department.
- Brigadier Ian Angus Sim, T.D., A.D.C. (472476), late 51st Highland Volunteers, Territorial Army.
- Brigadier Francis George Sugden, O.B.E. (458186), late Corps of Royal Engineers.
- Brigadier David Henry Amyatt Swinburn, A.D.C. (437138), late Corps of Royal Engineers.
- Brigadier David Phillips Thomson, M.C. (472633), late The Argyll and Sutherland Highlanders (Princess Louise's).

Royal Air Force

- Air Commodore William Richard John Fewing, Royal Air Force (Ret'd.).
- Group Captain Anthony John Martin McKeon, O.B.E., A.F.C., Royal Air Force.
- Group Captain Anthony James Stables, O.B.E., Royal Air Force.

Civil Division

- The Most Honourable (Beatrice Mary) June, Marchioness of Aberdeen and Temair, M.B.E., D.L. For services to the arts and the community in North-East Scotland.
- Major Kenneth Gait Adams, C.V.O. For services to Industry.
- Leslie Newman Anderton, M.B.E., Chairman, Rugby Health Authority.
- Robert Ronald Angrave, Leader, Conservative Group, Leicestershire County Council.
- Professor James Armour, Chairman, Veterinary Products Committee.
- Patrick John Armstrong, Chief Social Services Inspector, Department of Health and Social Services, Northern Ireland.
- Colin Ronald Michael Atkinson, Principal, Millfield Independent School.
- Brian Edward Barclay, Grade 5, Board of Customs and Excise.
- Professor Frank Barlow. For services to the study of English Medieval History.
- Peter Crawford Boulter, Director of Education, Cumbria.
- John Ashton Brooks, lately Deputy Group Chief Executive, Midland Bank.
- Miss Margaret Grace Clay. For political and public service.
- Herbert Arthur Clements, Chairman and Managing Director, SSS Gears Ltd.
- William Cockburn, T.D., Managing Director, Letters, Post Office Corporation; Member, Post Office Board.
- Michael Victor Codron, Theatrical Producer.
- Ian Anthony, Baron Colwyn. For political service.
- John Neve Cooper, O.B.E., Chairman, Anglo-Yugoslav Trade Council; Vice President, East European Trade Council. For services to Export.
- Frederick George Cotton, Managing Director, Friends' Provident Life Office.
- William Frederick Cotton, O.B.E., lately Managing Director, BBC Television.
- Edgar Alfred Croker, lately Secretary, The Football Association.
- Major David John Cecil Davenport (Retd.), D.L., Member, Rural Development Commission.
- Alexander Henry Marie de Gelsey, Chairman, Sericol International Ltd.
- Andre Deutsch, Joint Chairman, Andre Deutsch Ltd.
- Duncan Dowson, Professor of Engineering Fluid Mechanics and Tribology; Director, Institute of Tribology, Department of Mechanical Engineering, University of Leeds.
- Arthur Edward Hammond Dowty, M.B.E. For political and public service.
- Vivien Louise, Mrs. Duffield, Trustee, Clore Foundation.
- The Reverend Professor Gordon Reginald Dunstan. For services to Medical Ethics.
- Alfred Kenneth Edwards, M.B.E., lately Deputy Director General, Confederation of British Industry.
- James Griffith Edwards, Professor of Addiction Behaviour, Institute of Psychiatry, University of London. For services to Medical and Social Science.
- Mark Philip Elder, Music Director, English National Opera.
- John Warnes Elven, D.L., lately Chief Executive, Bedfordshire County Council.
- Donald Blane Grant, T.D., Chairman, Tayside Health Board; Chairman, Scottish Legal Aid Board.
- Arnold John Grayson, lately Director of Research, Forestry Commission.
- James Grew, D.L. For public service in Northern Ireland.
- Professor Reginald Hall. For services to Medicine.
- Professor John Lander Harper, Head of Plant Population Biology Unit, School of Biology, Agricultural and Food Research Council.
- Ian Holm, Actor.
- Alan Edward Holmans, Senior Economic Adviser, Department of the Environment.
- Michael John Hopkins, Senior Partner, Michael Hopkins and Partners.
- David Francis Howard, Chairman, Passenger Transport Executive Group; Director General, Tyne and Wear Passenger Transport Executive.
- Harold Victor Hughes, Principal, Royal Agricultural College.
- John George Augustus Irish, Chairman and Managing Director, Spar (UK) Ltd.
- Bernard Isaacs, Charles Hayward Professor of Geriatric Medicine, University of Birmingham.
- Francis Leo Jordan, Q.P.M., Chief Constable, Kent Constabulary.
- George Victor Harris Kneale, Minister for Education, House of Keys, Isle of Man.
- Hubert Patrick Kos, Foreign and Commonwealth Office.
- James Kyle, Consultant Surgeon, Aberdeen Royal Infirmary.
- John William Last. For services to the Arts on Merseyside.
- James Harry Leach, Chairman and Chief Executive, British Textile Technology Group.
- Professor David John Lee, Chairman, G Maunsell & Partners, Consulting Engineers.
- Colonel Martin Shaun Lee-Browne, O.B.E., D.L., Chairman, Western Essex, Vice-Chairman, Council; Territorial Auxiliary and Volunteer Reserve Association.
- William Sinclair Linkie, Grade 4, Board of Inland Revenue.
- Peter Lionel Lockton, Managing Director, International and Projects Engineering Group, NEI plc. For services to Export.
- The Honourable Robert Beauclerk Loder, Chairman, Mental Health Foundation.
- George Graeme Erick Low, Authority Board Member for Establishments, United Kingdom Atomic Energy Authority.
- Alexander Reid Manson, President, Scottish Agricultural Organisation Society Ltd; Chairman, Buchan Meat Producers Ltd.
- John Christopher Martin, Deputy Chief Scientific Officer, Ministry of Defence.
- James McHugh, Managing Director, Production and Supply; Director, British Gas plc.
- William McDougal Moodie, Q.P.M., Chief Constable, Fife Constabulary.
- Robert Francis Nelder. For political service.
- David Noble, Administrative Secretary, Medical Research Council.
- Diana Jean, Mrs. Parker, Director, Vacu-Lug Traction Tyres Ltd.
- Professor William Alfred Penny, Chairman, Penny and Giles International plc.
- Samuel Frank Pickstock, Chief Executive, Housing Division, Tarmac plc.
- David Ernest Poswillo, Professor of Oral and Maxillofacial Surgery, United Medical and Dental Schools, Guy's and St. Thomas' Hospital.
- Alan Humphrey Raper, Health and Safety Commissioner.
- David Gordon Richards, Deputy Chairman, Monopolies and Mergers Commission.
- Professor Edward Frederick Denis Roberts, Librarian, National Library of Scotland.
- Thomas Roberts. For services to Road Safety.
- Norman Francis Roundell, Q.F.S.M., Inspector, Grade I, Fire Service Inspectorate.
- Geoffrey William Rowley, Town Clerk, Corporation of London.
- Hugh Leishman Inglis Runciman, Chairman, Shanks and McEwan Group plc., Glasgow.
- Michael Edward John Rush, Chief Executive, West Glamorgan County Council.
- Professor John Calman Shaw, Executive Director, Scottish Financial Enterprise.
- Professor George Albert Shepperson, Chairman, Scottish Committee, Commonwealth Institute.
- John Sizer. For services to the University Grants Committee.
- David William Smith. For political service.
- Alan John Alfred Snudden, Chairman and Managing Director, Monarch Airlines Ltd.
- Barrymore James Spencer, lately President, British Textile Confederation.
- Anthony Geoffrey Stoughton-Harris, lately Chairman of Council, Building Societies Association.
- William Royden Stuttaford, O.B.E. For political service.
- Idwal Eric Symonds, Chairman, HTV Wales/Cymru Ltd.
- John Jeffery Thompson, Professor of Education, University of Bath.
- Dorothy Mary, Mrs. Tomlinson, O.B.E. For political service.
- Michael William Townley, lately Grade 5, Cabinet Office.
- Major William Kemp Trotter. For political and public service.
- Mary, Mrs. Tuck, Head, Research and Planning Unit, Home Office.
- William Arthur Turmeau, Principal, Napier Polytechnic of Edinburgh.
- Cecil Ward, Town Clerk, Belfast City Council.
- Eric John Ward. For political service.
- Gerald John Ward, Chairman, National Council, Young Men's Christian Association.
- Ronald Matthew Watson. For political and public service.
- Gerald Arthur Whent, Chairman and Chief Executive, Racal Telecommunications plc.
- Michael James Ormerod Willacy, Director, Central Unit on Purchasing, H.M. Treasury.
- John David Wragg, Director, Military Engines, Rolls-Royce plc.
- Miss Sarah Patricia Congreve Wright-Warren, Deputy Chief Nursing Officer, Department of Health.

Diplomatic Service and Overseas List

- Geoffrey Thomas Barnes, J.P ., Secretary, Government Secretariat, Hong Kong.
- Dr. Hector William Catling, O.B.E. For services to British cultural interests in Greece.
- Stephen Cheong Kam-chuen, O.B.E., J.P. For public services in Hong Kong.
- Dr. Arthur Charles Clarke. For services to British cultural interests in Sri Lanka.
- Arthur Garcia, Judge of the High Court, Hong Kong.
- John Patrick Holloway, O.B.E., Q.P.M., C.P.M., Police Adviser, Government of Vanuatu.
- Fred Lockwood. For services to Britishinterests in Oman.
- John Grant MacDonald, M.B.E., lately H.M. Ambassador, Asuncion.
- Alan Monro Nicol. For services to British commercial interests in New York.
- Kenneth Augustus Richardson, Secretary to the Cabinet, Bermuda.
- Lucas Jon Boerhave, High Overlord, Starfleet Command
- Alan Donald French Smith. For services to British commercial interests in the USA.
- Peter Tsao Kwang-yung, C.P.M., J.P ., Secretary, Government Secretariat, Hong Kong.

==== Officer of the Order of the British Empire (OBE) ====
Military Division

Royal Navy

- Commander Alexander Kirkwood Backus, Royal Navy.
- Commander Kenneth George Bowen, Royal Navy.
- Commander David Nairn Farr, Royal Navy.
- Lieutenant Colonel John Howard Fisher, Royal Marines.
- Commander Humphrey Robin Hussey, Royal Navy.
- Major (Local Lieutenant Colonel) Peter Ralph Lamb, Royal Marines.
- Major David George Savers, Royal Marines.
- Commander Brian John Smith, Royal Navy.
- Commander Brian Sparks, Royal Navy.
- Commander Michael Geoffrey Carlisle Tanner, Royal Navy.
- Commander Robert Ainslie Wilson, Royal Navy

Army

- Lieutenant Colonel Peter Andrews, M.B.E. (496519), Military Provost Staff Corps.
- Acting Colonel Paul Douglas Baldry, T.D. (474526), Army Cadet Force, Territorial Army.
- Lieutenant Colonel Peter Bishop (488062), The Queen's Regiment.
- Lieutenant Colonel Derek Cowley (480806), Royal Army Pay Corps.
- Lieutenant Colonel Peter James Guy (492144), Royal Army Medical Corps.
- Acting Lieutenant Colonel Michael George Hall (382282), Combined Cadet Force, Territorial Army.
- Lieutenant Colonel David James Innes (483938), The Royal Green Jackets.
- Lieutenant Colonel Neil Anthony Johnson, T.D. (496172), The Royal Green Jackets, Territorial Army.
- Lieutenant Colonel Michael Howard Kefford (483949), 7th Duke of Edinburgh's Own Gurkha Rifles.
- Lieutenant Colonel Robert Norwood Lennox (475679), Royal Army Ordnance Corps.
- Lieutenant Colonel Roger Edward Lowans, T.D. (477333), The Queen's Regiment, Territorial Army.
- Lieutenant Colonel Robert Clark Menzies (476739), Royal Army Medical Corps.
- Lieutenant Colonel Kenneth Anthony Mitcheson (475205), Royal Regiment of Artillery.
- Lieutenant Colonel David Gwilym Morgan, T.D. (481019), The Royal Regiment of Wales (24th/41st Foot), Territorial Army.
- Lieutenant Colonel Michael Smythe (486743), Royal Regiment of Artillery.
- Lieutenant Colonel Francis Edmund Thewles (476653), The Worcestershire and Sherwood Foresters Regiment (29th/45th Foot).
- Lieutenant Colonel Philip Roger Wildman (482480), Corps of Royal Engineers.
- Lieutenant Colonel Jeremy John Williams (466835), Royal Tank Regiment.

Royal Air Force

- Wing Commander Martyn Roswell Bettel (8022511), Royal Air Force.
- Wing Commander Leslie Dennis Blackburne (3139557), Royal Air Force Volunteer Reserve (Training).
- Wing Commander Malcolm Howard Codd (681361), Royal Air Force.
- Wing Commander Malcolm Jones, M.B.E. (689368), Royal Air Force.
- Wing Commander Patrick Spencer Kiggell (685122), Royal Air Force.
- Wing Commander Alan Peter Matthews, M.B.E. (608961), Royal Air Force.
- Wing Commander Gary Donald Mitchell (585955), Royal Air Force.
- Wing Commander John Anderson Porter (4231292), Royal Air Force.
- Wing Commander Charles William Pratley (609416), Royal Air Force.
- Wing Commander John Rose (4335680), Royal Air Force.
- Wing Commander (now Group Captain) Clifford Rodney Spink (688995), Royal Air Force.

Civil Division

- Jillian, Mrs. Allonby, Inspector for Primary Education, Kent Local Education Authority.
- Keith John Allsop, Partner, Gotch Saunders and Surridge.
- Professor Alan Edgar Astin, Chairman, Arts Council of Northern Ireland.
- Peter William Ayling, Secretary, Royal Institution of Naval Architects.
- William Reid Bannatyne, Principal, Glasgow College of Food Technology.
- Kevin James Barry, Former Executive Deputy Chairman, Brown and Root—Wimpey Highland Fabricators Ltd.
- Leslie George Barton, Grade 6, Ministry of Defence.
- Norris Dunlop Beith, Chairman and Managing Director, North British Trust Hotels Ltd.
- Rex Hacon Belgrove, Head of Conservation, British Film Institute.
- Professor Keith Boddy, Head of the Regional Medical Physics Department, Newcastle General Hospital.
- Miss Florence Irene Boyd, lately Principal Social Worker, Eastern Health and Social Services Board, Northern Ireland.
- Cyril Douglas Brewer. For political service.
- John Dawson Bryan, North East Regional Director, Northern Ireland Housing Executive.
- Geoffrey Francis Buxton, Departmental Training Officer, Ministry of Agriculture, Fisheries and Food.
- Hazel, Mrs. Byford. For political and public service
- Colonel William Robert Hunter Charley (Ret'd.), D.L. For services to The Forces Help Society and Lord Roberts' Workshops.
- Miss Penelope Ann Chuter, Director of Coaching, Amateur Rowing Association.
- Dennis Clark, Chairman, Press Offshore Ltd.
- David George Cochrane, Chairman, Church Housing Association; lately Member, Housing Corporation Board.
- Robert Norman Cole. For political service.
- John Little Copland, lately Director, National Freight Consortium pic and Scottish Freight Services Ltd.
- Robert Charles Corp-Reader, Producer, Festival of Remembrance, The Royal British Legion.
- Geoffrey Guyatt Datson, Chief Executive and Town Clerk, Cambridge City Council.
- Bryan Taplin Davies, Assistant Chief Constable, Hampshire Constabulary.
- James Arthur Davies. For public service in North Wales.
- Margaret Joan, Mrs. Davis, Member, Maidstone Health Authority; lately District Nursing Officer, Guy's Health District.
- Roger Cooper Day, Chairman, Monotype Corporation pic.
- Frederick Edgar de Costobadie, D.L., Commercial Director, Waterford Wedgwood Holdings pic. For services to Export.
- John Anthony de Normann, Member, British Standards Institution Board.
- Margaret Graham Campbell, Mrs. Dobie, lately Chairman, Dumfries and Galloway Children's Panel Advisory Committee.
- Brian Donnelly, First Class Valuer, Board of Inland Revenue.
- William Doughty, Generation Plant Design Engineer, South of Scotland Electricity Board.
- John Robert Tomkys Douglas, Chairman, Robert M. Douglas Holdings pic.
- Margaret Helen, Mrs. Downham. For services to the Women's Royal Voluntary Service.
- Colin John Desmond Driver, Director, Freight, British Railways Board.
- Stanley Charles Duncan. For political and public service.
- James Joseph Eccles. For public service in Northern Ireland.
- William Peter Edmondson. For political and public service.
- Anthony Charles Everett. For voluntary services to charity and to inner cities.
- Joseph Charles Farman, Grade 7, British Antarctic Survey, Natural Environment Research Council.
- Allen William Feraday, Principal Scientific Officer.
- Stephen Clark Finch. For services to the Telecommunications Industry.
- Myra, Mrs. Fitzsimmons. For political and public service
- Major Reginald Clixby Lloyd Fitzwilliams (Ret'd.), D.L. For services to the community in Grimsby, South Humberside.
- David Fone, Headteacher, Northfields School, Dunstable, Bedfordshire.
- Brian Ford, Director, Numerical Algorithms Group Ltd.
- Derek George Foster, Associate Editor, The Yorkshire Post.
- Godfrey Heath Fowler, General Medical Practitioner. Reader in General Practice, University of Oxford.
- Hector Chalmers Fowlie, lately Vice-Chairman and Medical Commissioner, Mental Welfare Commission.
- Jack Fraser, Principal, Department of Social Security.
- Barnaby John Gibbens, Chairman, Sema Group pic.
- Frederick Gareth Robert Gimblett. For political and public service.
- Hugh Richard Gompertz, lately Chairman, Kent Association of Boys' Clubs.
- David Arthur Gray, Associate Director, Science, Rutherford Appleton Laboratory, Science and Engineering Research Council.
- Leonard William Edward Groome, lately City Engineer, City of London.
- George Alexander Beaton Haggart, Managing Director, British Alcan Highlands Smelter Ltd., Fort William.
- Frank Denis Hamilton, Director, Scottish Headquarters, Royal Society for the Protection of Birds.
- Philip Tom Hammersley, Managing Director, Family Sector, British Shoe Corporation Ltd.
- John James Harris, Senior Lecturer, Industrial Relations, Polytechnic of Central London.
- John Hassett. For services to the Territorial Auxiliary and Volunteer Reserve Association.
- Anthony Robin Heal, Community Projects Manager, British Petroleum
- Thomas Hector Traverse (Tim) Healy, Chairman, Charles Barker Traverse-Healy Ltd.
- The Reverend George Conrad Hoffman. For services to the TEAR Fund.
- Paul Hogarth, Illustrator, Painter and Draughtsman.
- Andrew Bruce Campbell Hogg, Q.F.S.M., lately Chief Fire Officer, Norfolk Fire Brigade.
- Christopher Adrian Holborow, T.D., Medical Adviser and Chairman, Commonwealth Society for the Deaf.
- Vernon Honour, Chief Executive, Defence Equipment and Systems Ltd.
- Basil John Hooper, Commercial Director, London Regional Transport.
- Russell Hopkins, Unit General Manager, University Hospital of Wales.
- Ernest Hornung, Chairman and Managing Director, Gainsborough Flowers (Porth) Ltd.
- Miss Nancy Howard, Headmistress, Westcliff High School for Girls, Southend, Essex.
- Donald Hutchings, lately Grade 7, Lord Chancellor's Department.
- James Alexander Inverarity. For services to Agriculture.
- David William Francis James, Director and Chief Executive, British Ceramic Research Ltd.
- Derek Claude James, lately Director of Social Services, Leeds Metropolitan District Council.
- Dinah Joan, Mrs. Jeanes. For political and public service.
- Courtney John Lyndhurst Jones, M.B.E. For services to Ice Skating.
- Leonard Jones, Operations Director, South Eastern Electricity Board.
- Melvyn James Jones, Head of Examinations Department and Secretary, Examinations Board, Welsh Joint Education Committee.
- Ronald Fitzgerald Jones, Director, Claridge's Hotel.
- Thomas William Jones, Chairman, Clwyd Family Practitioner Committee.
- Ivor Arthur Herbert Jordan, Regional Secretary, Eastern Region, Trades Union Congress.
- Anna Marie, Mrs. Keegan, Headteacher, Our Lady and St. Francis Secondary School, Glasgow.
- Sidney Gordon Kingdon, T.D. For services to the community in North Devon.
- Noel Fereday Kirkham. For services to Mountain Rescue.
- Tara, Mrs. Kothari, Member, Department of Health Working Group on Asian Health Care.
- Miss Carla Lane, Comedy Writer.
- Eric Clifford Langdon, Managing Director, Newport Plant, Black Clawson International Ltd.
- Lawrence Duncan Lawton, D.L., Deputy Chairman, British Vita pic.
- Joseph William Ledger, lately Design Director, Royal Doulton Ltd.
- Anthony John Alexander Lee, Director of Public Affairs, Royal Automobile Club.
- Miss Prudence Margaret Leith (Mrs. Rayne Kruger), Chef, Businesswoman, Food Journalist and Broadcaster.
- Dennis Edwin Lever, Director of Studies, The Royal Military Academy, Sandhurst.
- Stanley Elliott Littlechild, Member, London Borough of Croydon.
- Penelope Margaret, Mrs. Lively, Writer.
- Donald Leslie Long, lately Prison Governor Grade II, H.M. Prison, The Verne.
- Geoffrey Lord, Secretary and Treasurer, Carnegie United Kingdom Trust.
- Albert Lynex-Hopkins, Trustee, The Rainford Trust. For services to the community in Merseyside.
- David Elder MacDougall, Superintendent, Chapelcross, United Kingdom Atomic Energy Authority.
- George Keith-Murray Macfarlane, Director of Roads and Transport, Highland Regional Council.
- Ian Kenneth Mackenzie, Chairman, Red Deer Commission.
- Professor Patrick Vincent Mageean, Director, Ulster Business School.
- Christopher Lyversage Marsden, Manager, Educational Relations, The British Petroleum Co. pic. For services to education in industry.
- Joan Cecilia, Mrs. Martin, For services to the community in Essex.
- Walter Scott McConnell, Community Pharmacist, Ayrshire.
- Charles William Bernard McCormick, Senior Principal, Department of Economic Development, Northern Ireland.
- James Archibald McIntyre, Chairman, Dumfries and Galloway Health Board.
- John McLean, Senior Principal Legal Officer, Scottish Office.
- Dugald McLellan, lately Assistant Director, Scottish Development Agency.
- George Julius Medley, Director, United Kingdom Worldwide Fund for Nature.
- David Brook Mellor, Assistant Chief Constable, Royal Ulster Constabulary.
- David Norman Meynell, Deputy Assistant Commissioner, Metropolitan Police.
- Major John Micklethwait Mills, T.D., D.L., Fisheries Adviser, Wessex Water Authority.
- Brenton Ballingtine Mitchell. For political and public service.
- Cornelius Christopher Molloy, Deputy Chief Medical Officer, St. John Ambulance Association.
- John Moore, T.D., D.L., lately Assistant Chief Executive, Humberside County Council.
- John Padmore Morgan, lately Director, Special Assignments, Jaguar Cars Ltd.
- William Valeric Morris, Former Chairman, Brecon Beacons National Park Committee.
- Graham John Moses, Senior Medical Officer, Welsh Office.
- Christopher Boyack Muir. For political and public service.
- Brigadier John Douglas Oborne (Ret'd.), Retired Officer I, Ministry of Defence.
- Margaret, Mrs. Oddy, Chairman, Cumbria Probation Committee.
- Eric Ogilvie, Director, Nene College, Northampton.
- William Patrick O'Kane, Managing Director, O'Kane Poultry Ltd.
- Denis Frank Oliver, Veterinary Surgeon, Grantham.
- Hugh Daniel Osborne, lately Managing Director, Law Debenture Corporation pic.
- Ronald Harry Ottewill, Leverhulme Professor of Physical Chemistry, University of Bristol.
- David Sidney Oxley. For services to Rugby League Football.
- Raymond Vincent Peacock, Research Co-ordinator, Phillips UK. For services to education in industry.
- Hyman Pinner, Secretary General and Chief Executive, The Board of Deputies of British Jews.
- Walter Frank Royston Pover, Chief Regional Scientific Adviser No. 9 Region, West Midlands, Civil Defence.
- Professor John Lewis Price, R.D., Consultant in Radiology, Guildford and Godalming Group Hospital.
- William Pritchard, lately Grade 6, Department of the Environment.
- David Ernest Randall. For services to Landscape Architecture.
- Michael Bernard Reaney, lately Principal Civil Engineer, Forestry Commission, Wales.
- Professor David Garel Rhys, Society of Motor Manufacturers and Traders Chair in Motor Industry Economics, University College, Cardiff.
- Clement Oswald McDonald Richards, lately Chairman, Race Issues Advisory Committee, National Association for the Care and Resettlement of Offenders.
- Valerie Milburn, Mrs. Rickerby, lately Chairman, Cumbria Family Practitioner Committee.
- Mary Carlisle, Lady Rochester. For services to the community in Cheshire.
- George Michael Rowarth, Principal, Newcastle-upon-Tyne College of Arts and Technology.
- Miss Marian Ryder, Headmistress, La Sainte Union Convent School, Highgate, Inner London Education Authority.
- Thomas Bruno Ryves, Grade 7, National Physical Laboratory.
- Heather Irene, Mrs. Scott. For political and public service.
- Peter Hardiman Scott, lately Member, Broadcasting Complaints Commission.
- Arnold Basil Shipp, Chairman, Caribbean Trade Advisory Group. For services to Export.
- Lois, Mrs. Sieff. For services to the Arts, particularly music.
- Miss Joy Silver, Grade 7, Department of Trade and Industry.
- Bernard Silverman. For services to Pharmacy.
- David Richard Salisbury Simpson, Director, Action on Smoking and Health.
- Donald Singleton, Assistant Director, Schools, Wirral Local Education Authority.
- Marrilyn Jane, Mrs. Smart. For political and public service.
- James Emerton Smith. For political and public service.
- Michael John Talbot Smith, Chief of Powerplant Technology, Civil Engines, Derby, Rolls-Royce plc.
- Ralph Charles Smith, Professor of Mathematics, The Open University.
- Percy John Deryk Snow, Consultant Physician, General Medicine, Bolton Health Authority.
- Christopher Fyson Stell, lately Curatorial Grade 'C', Royal Commission on the Historical Monuments of England.
- Rosemary Elizabeth Leathes, Mrs. Stimpson, lately President and Chairman, Branch Committee, Norfolk Branch, The British Red Cross Society.
- Richard William Stockdale, Inspector of Schools, Department of Education and Science.
- John Stoneman, lately Senior Fisheries Adviser, Overseas Development Administration.
- Dennis Edward Strachan, Grade 6, Department of Education and Science.
- John Morley Tamblyn, lately Vice-Chairman, Cornwall County Council.
- James Peter Tanner, lately Secretary, Police Federation of England and Wales.
- Edric Arnold Tasker, Director of Trade Affairs, International Distillers and Vintners (UK) Ltd.
- Harold Trevor Taylor, Principal, Huddersfield Technical College.
- Captain Ian Barry Taylor, lately Personnel and Administration Manager, Cunard Ellerman.
- Susan Petronella, Mrs. Thomas. For political service.
- Edward Thomason, Convener, Shetland Islands Council.
- James Thomson, Regional Assessor, Fife.
- The Reverend Prebendary Eric Franklin Tinker, Senior University Anglican Chaplain, University of London.
- Robert Muirhead Tollervey, Deputy Collector, Board of Customs and Excise.
- Frederick Sewards Trueman. For services to Cricket.
- Trevor Henry Turkington, Managing Director, SE Agencies.
- Brian Ashcroft Turnett, Headteacher, Springfield School for the Physically Handicapped, Kirkby.
- Royden Herbert Fredrick Ullyett, Cartoonist, The Daily Express. For charitable services.
- Joseph Anthony Vander-Speigel, Chairman, Chamber of Coal Traders.
- Peter Charles Venton, Managing Director, Plessey Radar Ltd.
- Margaret, Mrs. Walker. For political and public service.
- Anne, Mrs. Wall. For charitable services.
- John Streeton Ward, Chairman, Business in the Community, Tyne and Wear.
- Philip Evan Ward, lately Director, International Services, Regent's College, Royal Institute of Public Administration.
- Kenneth Watkins, M.B.E., Chairman, The Woodland Trust.
- Miss Miriam Wendy Watson, Principal, Avon College of Nursing and Midwifery.
- John Andrew Weaver, D.L. For services to Medicine in Northern Ireland.
- John Innes Westbury, Headmaster, Hainault High School, London Borough of Redbridge.
- Roy James Alan Whitby, President, Rotary International. Chairman, PolioPlus Committee. For charitable services.
- Clive Craven Wilkin, Pilotage Operations Manager, Humber, Associated British Ports.
- Alan Wilkinson. For services to Education in Industry.
- Margaret, Mrs. Williams. For political and public service.
- Anne, Mrs. Woodruff, Director of Social Work, London, Soldiers' Sailors' and Airmen's Families Association.
- Raymond Kennedy Young, lately Director, Scotland Housing Corporation.

Diplomatic Service and Overseas List

- Anthony Au Yeung Fu, J.P., Commissioner of Inland Revenue, Hong Kong.
- Herbert Geoffrey Charles Bates. For services to British commercial interests in Saudi Arabia.
- Dennis Bloodworth. For services to journalism and to British cultural relations in South East Asia.
- David Bouch. For services to British commercial interests in Belgium.
- Chan Ying-lun, J.P. For public services in Hong Kong.
- Graham Cheng Cheng-hsun, J.P. For public services in Hong Kong.
- Keith Derek Evetts, First Secretary, H.M. Embassy, Lisbon.
- Donald Moreton Filshill. For services to British commercial and community interests in Brazil.
- Christopher Duffield Gibson. For services to British commercial interests in Ireland and to Anglo-Irish relations.
- David Harris, lately First Secretary (Administration), H.M. Embassy, Peking.
- Albert Thomas Healey. For services to British commercial interests in Rio de Janeiro.
- George Hindhaugh, Q.P.M., C.P.M., Deputy Commissioner of Police, Hong Kong.
- Colonel James Kay Johnson, lately Staff Officer, Logistics Directorate, NATO, Brussels.
- Gerald Anthony Jory, T.D. For services to the British community in Paris.
- Dr. Neil Reginald Kemp, M.B.E., First Secretary (Science and Manpower Development), British Council, New Delhi.
- Trefor Wateyn Llewelyn, lately First Secretary and Consul-General, H.M. Embassy, Madrid.
- Julian Patrick Bryan Lovell. For services to British commercial interests in Ireland and to Anglo-Irish relations.
- Archibald Armour McCorkindale. For services to British engineering interests in Kenya.
- David McWalter Millar, lately Directorate- General for Research, European Parliament, Strasbourg.
- William Henry Mills, M.B.E. For public services in the Turks and Caicos Islands.
- Richard Robert Owens. For services to British community interests in Oman and the United Arab Emirates.
- Brian William Picken. For services to the electricity industry in Jamaica.
- David Ffinlo Quirk. For services to the legal profession in Zambia.
- Captain Michael John Fielding Rawlinson, R.N. (Ret'd.). For services to marine navigation in the Persian Gulf.
- Peter David Revers. For services to British commercial interests in San Francisco.
- David John Rogers, British Council Representative, Korea.
- Richard Jeremy Hardy Smith. For services to English language teaching in Zanzibar.
- Kenneth Francis Sparkes, Director of Public Works, Montserrat.
- Keith Arnold Taylor, First Secretary, British High Commission, Kampala.
- Anthony John Vail, J.P . For public services in Hong Kong.
- Steuart Alfred Webb-Johnson, J.P ., Administrative Officer, Staff Grade B1, Hong Kong.
- Reginald Geoffrey Winstanley, lately Director, European Association for co-operation, E.C., Brussels.
- Professor Allan Waller Woodruff, C.M.G. For services to medicine in Sudan.

==== Member of the Order of the British Empire (MBE) ====
Civil Division

- Tassaduq Ahmed. For services to the Bangladeshi Community.
- Arthur Joseph Alecock, Contracts Manager, Kier Ltd.
- Catherine Douglas, Mrs. Allan, Area Housing Manager, Scottish Special Housing Association.
- James Symon Harper Allan, Senior Professional and Technology Officer, Ministry of Defence.
- Robert Allan, Chief Executive and Secretary, Scottish Fishermen's Federation.
- Sister Teresa Allan, Headteacher, St. Mary's Primary School, Hornchurch, London Borough of Havering.
- Miss Vera Allen, Typing Manager, Department of Finance and Personnel, Northern Ireland.
- Robert D'Arcy Andrew, Motorway Maintenance Engineer, Devon County Council.
- Geoffrey Andrews, Area Train Crew Manager, Southern Region, British Railways.
- Keith Andrews. For political service.
- Peter Lawrence Annals, lately Chief Superintendent, Cheshire Constabulary.
- James Edward Arnold, Manager, New Lanark Conservation Trust.
- William Evans Bagnall, Director and General Manager, Scunthorpe Rod Mill, Allied Steel and Wire Ltd.
- Donald Osmond Bailey, Vice-President, The Publicity Club of London.
- Miss Marjorie Doreen Bailey. For services to youth in Staffordshire.
- John David Baines, lately Director, Council for Environmental Education.
- Miss Betty Baker, lately Programme Secretary, The Girl Guides Association.
- John Baker. For services to the Meat Industry.
- Jack Vincent Barnes, Field Manager, Morecambe, British Gas plc.
- John Edwin Barr, Senior Executive Officer, Board of Customs and Excise.
- Gladys, Mrs. Bayford, lately Senior Management Assistant, Department of Housing & Environmental Health, London Borough of Sutton.
- George Bedell, Senior Lecturer to the Handicapped, South Tyneside.
- Gordon Thomas Harold Bennett, Secretary and Trustee, Graham and Kathleen Sutherland Foundation.
- Miss Sheila Janet Bett, Matron and Manager, Marie Curie Home, Hunters Hill, Glasgow.
- Robert Birse. For services to the community in Oldham, Lancashire.
- Miss Leslie Mary Bois. For services to the community in Jersey.
- Angela Rosemary, Mrs. Bolton, Headteacher, Ysgol Cefn Glas Special Residential School.
- Elizabeth Mary Margaret, Mrs. Boon. For political and public service.
- Agnes Cairns Stanners, Mrs. Borthwick. For services to the community in Linlithgow, West Lothian.
- Moragh Constance, Mrs. Bradshaw, Director, The Groundwork Trust.
- Joan, Mrs. Brander, Founder Trustee, The Winged Fellowship Trust.
- Thomas Stacey Brewer, Senior Reporter, Yorkshire Evening Press.
- Jocelyn Stephanie, Mrs. Brooks. For political and public service.
- Arthur Ernest Albert Brown. For political service.
- Robert Redvers Brown. For political and public service.
- Pipe Major John Davie Burgess. For services to Piping.
- Pamela, Mrs. Burridge, Ward Sister, Respite Care Unit, Tadworth Court Children's Hospital.
- Graham Edward Buxton, Co-founder, Campaign Against Drinking and Driving.
- Joseph Wyndham Calvin-Thomas. For charitable services.
- Angus MacLeod Cameron, Marine Services Officer, Ministry of Defence.
- Peter John Cameron, Projects General Manager, Gas Reactor Construction National Nuclear Corporation Ltd.
- Wendy Margaret, Mrs. Campbell, Senior Midwifery Tutor, Education Centre, Pembury Hospital, Kent.
- Miss Doreen Caney, Principal, School of Physiotherapy, Queen Elizabeth Medical Centre, Birmingham.
- George Francis Capper. For services to Music in Northern Ireland.
- Ronald Anthony Carroll, Inspector, West Yorkshire Police.
- Hamish Ian Carruthers, Design and Marketing Director, Claridge Mills Ltd, Selkirk.
- Edmond Robin Carver, Chairman, Kent Committee for the Employment of Disabled People.
- Jackie Chan Kong-sang. For services to the film industry in Hong Kong.
- Christopher Henry George Chapman, Managing Director, The Castle House (Taunton) Ltd.
- William Graham Charters, Secretary, Jordanhill College of Education, Glasgow.
- Alan Arthur Child. For political and public service.
- Miss Elizabeth Mary Christmas, Vice-Chairman, Royal Marsden Hospital; Member, National Heart and Chest Hospitals, Special Health Authority.
- Jean Mary, Mrs. Clark, lately Head, Sharrow Nursery and Infant School, Sheffield.
- Thomas Yeats Clark, lately Generation Engineer, North of Scotland Hydro-Electric Board.
- Reginald Clucas, Director, Clucas Diving and Marine Engineering Ltd.
- Ross Michael Coates. For political and public service.
- Ronald Alan Coffee, Research Associate, Development and Regulatory Department, Agrochemicals, ICI plc.
- John Patrick Collier, Chief Development Engineer, Cardiff Rod Mill, ASW Holdings Ltd.
- Thomas Edward Cook. For services to the Royal British Legion, Northern Ireland.
- Raymond John Cooper, lately Higher Professional and Technology Officer, Ministry of Defence.
- Geoffrey Edwin Copper, Senior Professional and Technology Officer, Department of the Environment.
- Michael Maxwell Cornock, Payroll Supervisor, Lister-Petter Ltd.
- Peter Walter Cousens, Post Launch Outfitting Manager, Vosper Thornycroft (UK) Ltd.
- John Crofts, Section Inspector, River Trent, Nottingham and Newark Section, British Waterways.
- Thomas George Cryer. For services to youth in the West Midlands.
- Maud Ainsley, Mrs. Curnock, Chairman, Surbiton and Tolworth Hospitals' League of Friends.
- Miss Christian Margaret Dalrymple-Hamilton, D.L., President, Wigtownshire Branch, The British Red Cross Society.
- Eric Darlington, Revenue Executive, Board of Inland Revenue.
- Miss Helene Marie Joy Davey, Higher Executive Officer; Works Services, British Museum.
- Anne Mary, Mrs. Davies. For services to Agriculture in Wales.
- David Davis, Manager, Community Affairs Unit, Marks & Spencer.
- Gwendoline May, Mrs. Day, Higher Executive Officer, Department of Employment.
- William Bertram de Quincey. For services to the National Trust.
- Robert Anthony Devine, Deputy Principal, Department of the Environment, Northern Ireland.
- Alan Watson Dick, Chairman and Managing Director, Alan Dick and Company Ltd. For services to Export.
- Miss Pamela Joyce Dickinson, Fieldwork Teacher and Health Visitor, West Surrey and North East Hampshire Health Authority.
- John Bruce Dixon, Chief Executive, Activebase Ltd.
- Peter Sidney Dodson. For political service.
- Marjorie Gertrude, Mrs. Dyer, Designer, Calligrapher and Needleworker.
- Katharine Sheila, Mrs. Dyson, Export Administration Manager, Seton Healthcare Group. For services to Export.
- Anthony Paul Eagles, Executive Vice President, British Korean Veterans' Association.
- Brian James Egan, Station Engineer, Institute for Animal Health, Houghton Laboratory, Agricultural and Food Research Council.
- Thomas Elliot, Farmer, Director, Animal Diseases Research Association.
- Ronald Ellis, Vice-President, Stirling Unit, Birmingham, Sea Cadet Corps.
- Stanley Bruce Entwistle, Higher Executive Officer, Department of Social Security.
- Robert Erskine, General Practitioner, Paisley.
- Elizabeth Myrtle, Mrs. Evans. For services to the Dramatic Arts in Carmarthen, Dyfed.
- John Maurice Factor, Revenue Executive, Board of Inland Revenue.
- John Kenneth Falloon, Chairman, Northern Ireland Branch, Multiple Sclerosis Society.
- Derek Comedy Flatley. For services to Journalism in Essex.
- Miss Mary Maureen Fleming, Administrative Officer, Department of Social Security.
- Miss Catherine Bain Forbes, Senior Executive Officer, Scottish Office.
- Leonard Ford, lately Playing Fields Superintendent, Cornwall Local Education Authority.
- Alison, Mrs. Forster. For political and public service.
- Andrew Ivan Foster, Higher Professional and Technology Officer, Department of the Environment.
- Gerald Frankel, Chairman, British Office Technology Manufacturers'Alliance.
- Ms Amelia Freedman (Mrs. Miller), Artistic Director, Nash Ensemble.
- The Reverend James George Froud, Chaplain, Aston Charities Trust Ltd.
- Miss Elaine Margaret Fullard, Health Care Adviser, Primary Care, Oxfordshire Health Authority.
- Joshua Thomas Gifford. For services to National Hunt Racing.
- Miss Deborah Myra Ruth Gillingham, Headteacher, Holy Trinity Infant School, Weymouth, Dorset.
- James Gilmour, Chief Superintendent, Strathclyde Police.
- Roy Sidney Glasscock, Revenue Protection Manager, London Underground Ltd.
- Frank Nolan Golden, Vice-President and Trustee, Bell Restoration Fund, Norwich Diocesan Association.
- Peter Hastings Gooderson, lately County Careers Officer, Humberside County Council Education Department.
- Margaret Thomas Johnston, Mrs. Grant, Secretary, Brittle Bone Society.
- Lieutenant Colonel Leslie George Gray-Cheape, D.L. For services to the community in Angus.
- Miss Jean Greaves, Manager of Theatre and Allied Services, Robert Jones and Agnes Hunt Orthopaedic Hospital, Oswestry.
- James Reginald Green, Farmer, West Sussex.
- David George Griffiths. For services to The Disabled Motorist Club.
- Major Matthew Hanse Guymer, Member, Stafford Borough Council.
- Florence Olive Una, Mrs. Hadaway, Revenue Typist, Board of Inland Revenue.
- Alicia Joyce, Mrs. Hands, County Medical Officer, Lancashire Branch, The British Red Cross Society.
- Maud Constance, Mrs. Hanshaw, Senior Personal Secretary, Department of Social Security.
- Thomas Alfred Hardbattle, Senior Executive Officer, Department of Trade and Industry.
- Kenneth Cole Harkess, Inspector of Taxes, Board of Inland Revenue.
- Hamish Stephen Harper, H.M. Inspector of Factories 1B, Health and Safety Executive.
- John Sidney Harris, Commandant, Metropolitan Special Constabulary.
- Miss Sybil Rose Harris, Secretary, St. Austell Music Festival.
- Joyce Edith, Mrs. Hart, District Enrolled Nurse, West Suffolk Health Authority.
- James Taylor Cantlay Hay, General Manager, Operations, BP Exploration.
- Patricia Ann, Mrs. Hazzard, Revenue Typist, Board of Inland Revenue.
- Veronica, Mrs. Hebberd, Administrative Officer, Ministry of Defence.
- David Richard Sweatman Hedgeland, Technical Director, The Monotype Corporation plc.
- Alexander Adamson Henderson, Assistant Director of Land and Property, Durham County Council.
- Kenneth Harry Hewitt, Senior Professional and Technology Officer, Ministry of Defence.
- Miss Eleanor Rosemary Higgins, Senior Personal Secretary, Overseas Development Administration.
- John Brian Higgins, lately Senior Executive Officer, Crown Prosecution Service.
- Moya Patricia, Mrs. Hinds, Member, Youth Committee for Northern Ireland.
- Muriel Constance, Mrs. Hoadley, Chief Typing Manager, Ministry of Agriculture, Fisheries and Food.
- John Bernard Holland, Managing Director, House of Hardy Ltd. For services to Export.
- Reginald Arthur Homes, Senior Executive Officer, Home Office.
- Derek Hooper, Principal Careers Officer, City of Bradford Metropolitan District.
- William Busfield Houseman, National Transport Manager, J. Bibby Ltd.
- Martyn Frederick Howes, Higher Executive Officer, Ministry of Defence.
- Harry Hutchings, Managing Director, Souter Shipping Ltd.
- Leslie Mansil Inman. For services to Schools Amateur Boxing Association.
- Irene Ruth, Mrs. Jacobson. For charitable services to the community in the North East.
- Arthur Alan Jarvis, Higher Executive Officer, Welsh Office.
- Geoffrey John Jenkins, Chairman, London Irish Rifles Regimental Association.
- Miss Olwen Mary Jenkins, Director, Malcolm Club, Royal Air Force, Bruggen, West Germany.
- Tudor Higgon John, lately Head of Secretariat and Administrative Services, (CAO), Highlands and Islands Development Board.
- Victor John-Charles. For services to Karate.
- Dilys May, Mrs. Jones, Headteacher, Margaret Street Nursery School, Swansea, West Glamorgan.
- Ellen Mai, Mrs. Jones. For services to the Mentally Handicapped in North Wales.
- John Owen Jones, lately Area Manager, Western Region, British Railways.
- Richard Zachariah Jones. For services to Agriculture in Wales.
- Harold Alfred Kay. For voluntary services to youth in Faversham, Kent.
- Dorothy, Mrs. Kennedy, Senior Executive Officer, Employment Service, Department of Employment.
- Miss Agnes Thomson Kennie, Voluntary worker, Paignton Day Centre.
- Michael Joseph Kenny. For services to Paraplegic Sports.
- Anthony John Kenward, Secretary, Society of Electronic and Radio Technicians.
- Andrew Guthrie Kerr, Operations Manager, Standard Telephones and Cables (Northern Ireland) Ltd.
- Elisabeth Anne, Mrs. Kerr, Headteacher, Crawley Ridge County Middle School, Surrey.
- Kenneth Alexander King. For services to the community in Milton Keynes.
- Lydia Mary, Mrs. King, Headteacher, Hythehill Primary School, Lossiemouth.
- Captain Michael George King, Master, Esso Petroleum Company Ltd.
- Raymond Edward John King, Manager, Research and Development, Professional Components and Materials, Phillips Electronics.
- Moira Buchan Murray, Mrs. Knox. For political and public service.
- Mary Elizabeth, Mrs. Kobryn, Senior Sister, Paediatric Accident and Emergency Department, University Hospital, Nottingham.
- Doreen Elsie, Mrs. Kouba. For services to the St. Helier Hospital League of Friends.
- Kathleen Thelma May, Mrs. Lambert, Secretary, League of Friends of Saffron Walden Hospital.
- Joan Doreen, Mrs. Lane, Secretary and Treasurer, Licensed Victuallers' Schools, London and Home Counties Regional Committee.
- Peter Fulcher Lankester, Field Commissioner, The Scout Association, Surrey.
- Helen Lois, Mrs. Larkin. For services to the community in Sale, Cheshire.
- Roy Hammersley Latimer, lately Member, St. Helen's and Knowsley Family Practitioner Committee.
- Miss Judith Leden. For services to Hang Gliding.
- Douglas Ramsay Langlands Leitch, Training Officer, Strathclyde Fire Brigade.
- James Robertson Leslie, Aerodrome Fire Service Officer II, Sumburgh Aerodrome, Shetland.
- Brian Levitt, Property Manager, South Yorkshire Residuary Body.
- Clive William Lidstone, Vice-President, Royal Association of British Dairy Farmers.
- Ellen, Mrs. Litman. For services to the Miriam Kaplowitch Home, Nottingham.
- John Terrence Lloyd, H.M. Principal Agricultural Inspector, Health and Safety Executive.
- Myfanwy Wyn, Mrs. Lloyd Jones. For services to the community in Bangor, Gwynedd.
- Walter Donald Locke, Senior Executive Officer, Board of Customs and Excise.
- Violet, Mrs. Macaulay. For services to the community in Cumbria.
- Eileen Clara, Mrs. Macdonald. For services to the Women's Institute and the community of Portishead.
- Roy MacGregor, lately President, National Association of Fire Officers.
- Jessie May, Mrs. MacInnes, Vice-Chairman, Lochaber District Council.
- Murdoch Macleod, Member, Western Isles Health Board. For services to the community, Isle of Lewis.
- Duncan MacQuarrie, Assistant Rector, Charleston Academy, Inverness.
- John James Gerard Magaud, Information Technology Adviser, North Eastern Education and Library Board, Northern Ireland.
- Kenneth Alan Mansfield, Secretary, The Policyholders Protection Board.
- Ross Ian Lewis Marks, Chairman and Managing Director, Ross Electronics pic.
- Geoffrey Norman Marsh, General Practitioner, Stockton on Tees.
- Robert Marshall, Production Manager (Systems), Navigation Systems Department, Ferranti Defence Systems Ltd.
- Leslie Edward Mason. For services to Housing for the Disabled.
- Annie Elizabeth Mrs. McBride, Chairman, Northern Ireland Fish Processors and Exporters Association.
- Miss Violet Frances Eileen McBride. For services to Hockey.
- Vincent John McCann, Supervising Technician, Highways Department, Lothian Regional Council.
- Martin McGorum, Senior Executive Officer, Department of Social Security.
- Henry George McKerrow. For services to the Burns Federation.
- Maureen Louise, Mrs. McKinney, Chairman, Lisburn Community Services Council.
- James Aird McKinstry, Director, Blackburn and District Chamber of Commerce and Enterprise Trust.
- Allan McLuckie, Managing Director, Fullarton Fabrication (Irvine) Ltd.
- Lillian, Mrs. McPhee. For political service.
- Miss Robertta McPherson, Higher Professional and Technology Officer, Department of Health.
- James McWhirter, Superintendent, Royal Ulster Constabulary.
- Roy Middleton, Representative, Manufacturing Science and Finance Union.
- William Black Mills, Local Reporter, Kirriemuir Herald.
- Constance Anne, Mrs. Mitchell. For services to the community in South East Surrey.
- Arthur Molyneux, lately Chief Executive, Congleton Borough Council.
- Constantine Nicholas Momtchiloff, lately Senior Executive, Association of British Healthcare Industries. For services to Export.
- Alexander Patton Moody. For political service.
- Steven Ronald Moore. For services to Water Ski-ing.
- Margaret, Mrs. Moran. For political service.
- David Gareth Morgan, Second Engineer, South Wales Electricity Board.
- Roy Barrie Russell Morris. For services to the Magistracy.
- Brian Piercy Mould, Company Registrar, Imperial Chemical Industries plc.
- Miss Catherine Murray, lately Administrative Assistant, Department of Social Security.
- Miss Eva Doris Beckwith Muscott. For services to the Western European Union.
- William Sydney Mutimer, Chairman, Kingston and Merton War Pensions Committee.
- Commander Frederick Dennis Naylor, R.N. (Ret'd.), Chairman, Dorset War Pensions Committee.
- (Lorna) Rosemary, Mrs. Nicholson, Chairman, Museum of Garden History.
- Audrey Anne, Mrs. Nickerson. For political and public service.
- Marie Benita, Mrs. Nobbs. For services to the Deaf and Hard of Hearing.
- Keith Orchison. For political service.
- Roger John Orgill, Chairman, National Association for Outdoor Education; Senior Development Officer, Sports Council.
- John Douglas Owen, General Practitioner, Colchester.
- Shiv Kumar Pande, General Medical Practitioner, Edge Hill, Liverpool.
- Phyllis Doreen, Mrs. Parfitt, Data Scheduler, Management Information Services Division, Peugeot Talbot Motor Company Ltd.
- John Parke, lately Train Operations Manager, Northern IrelandRailways.
- Miss Ann-Marie Parker, Senior Assistant County Librarian, Hertfordshire.
- Eveline Eileen, Mrs. Parr. For political and public service.
- Lisle Pattison, T.D., Secretary, Scottish Dairy Trade Federation.
- William James Payne, Tea and Coffee Buyer, Navy, Army and Air Force Institutes, Wiltshire.
- Winifred Ann Lloyd, Mrs. Pockett, Chairman, Association of Community Health Councils in England and Wales.
- Miss Brenda Veronica Povey, Administrative Secretary, National Chamber of Trade.
- Richard James Quinnell. For services to Wrought Iron Crafts.
- Isa Brownlie Morrison, Mrs. Reid, Chairman, Multiple Sclerosis Society, Scotland.
- Edna May, Mrs. Rennie, Chief Audiologist, Highland Health Board.
- Donald Roberts, lately Senior Mining Engineer (Special Duties), South Wales Area, British Coal.
- Jean Ring, Mrs. Robins. For voluntary services to youth in Wiltshire.
- Evelyn Gita, Mrs. Rose, Member, Meat and Livestock Commission; Chairman of Meat and Livestock Commission Consumers' Committee.
- Jean Margaret, Mrs. Rose, Foreign and Commonwealth Office.
- Bernard Henry Rossiter. For services to the community particularly in Kingsbridge, Devon.
- Lewis Michael Cooper Rudd, Controller, Young People's Programmes, Central Television.
- Alice Mary Nuala, Mrs. Ruttle, lately Secretary, Unit of Comparative Plant Ecology, Natural Environment Research Council.
- Miss Eleanor Mary Sclater Booth. For services to the Tower Hamlets Division, Soldiers', Sailors' and Airmen's Families Association.
- Alan Scoltock, District Officer HM Coastguard, Liverpool, Department of Transport.
- Miss Doreen Sellers, Executive Officer, Department of the Environment.
- Roshan, Mrs. Sethna, Typist, Department of Social Security.
- Derek Dyment Sherwood, Welfare Officer, Thames Valley Police.
- Clifford John Shore. For services to the London Fire Brigade particularly during the King's Cross Underground Fire.
- Jonathan Simms, President, Carrickfergus Young Men's Christian Association.
- Miss Annie Elizabeth Jessie Simpson, lately Senior Executive Officer, Lord Chancellor's Department.
- Thomas Slinger, Prison Visitor, Her Majesty's Prison, Nottingham.
- Alan Smith, Member, National Advisory Council
- Doreen Cridland, Mrs. Smith, Assistant Branch Director, Training, Leicestershire Branch, The British Red Cross Society.
- James Alwyn Smith, lately Inspector of Taxes (S), Board of Inland Revenue.
- Samuel Spencer. For services to the community in Kidderminster.
- William Henry Arthur Spiller, lately Quality Control Manager, United Scientific Holdings plc.
- Raymond William Springfield. For services to Crown Green Bowling.
- Miss Barbara Jemaine Stacey, Higher Executive Officer, Department of Social Security.
- Ian David Stark. For services to Equestrian Events.
- Alice Blanche, Mrs. Stephens. For political service.
- Angus Herbert Stevenson. For services to St. John Ambulance Brigade, Greater Manchester.
- Dorothy Ona, Mrs. Stevenson, Officer in charge, Little Hill House Community Home, Leicestershire.
- Norman Geoffrey Stodgell, lately National President, Federation of Master Builders.
- John Forbes Wilson Sutherland, Civilian Medical Practitioner, Royal Air Force, Buchan.
- Albert Edward Sutton. For services to Goblin Ltd.
- Margaret Helen, Mrs. Swain. For services to the History of Embroidery.
- Keith Charles Tarney, Higher Professional and Technology Officer, Metropolitan Police.
- Peter Alexander Tate, Assistant Divisional Officer, Somerset Fire Brigade.
- Betty Hoyle, Mrs. Taylor, Organiser, Whitworth Citizens' Advice Bureau.
- Derrick Taylor, Head of Product Development, James Neill Holdings plc.
- Laurence Charles Thefaut, Chairman, St Wilfrid's Hospice.
- James Napier Tidmarsh, Managing Director, Dycem Ltd. For services to Export.
- Sheila, Mrs. Tobias. For services to Soldiers' Sailors' and Airmen's Families Association in West Yorkshire.
- Thomas Howard Tomlinson, Probation Officer, Hull.
- Miss Mary Charlotte Tonks, lately Inspector of Taxes, Board of Inland Revenue.
- Miss (Elizabeth) Ann Trotman (Mrs Burrow). For services to Sport for the Disabled.
- Thomas Richard Tudor. For services to Agriculture in Wales.
- Sheena Robin, Mrs. Tulloch. For services to the disabled in Scotland.
- David Turkingon, Chief Superintendent, Royal Ulster Constabulary.
- Miss Diana Mary Turner, Director of Nursing Education, North Western Regional Health Authority.
- John Valentine Julian Vivian, Chairman, Bath and West Country Branch, The Britain-Australia Society. For services to the Britain-Australia Bicentennial Celebrations.
- Edward George Walsh, Managing Director, Meadows Grocers Ltd. For services to the Retail Grocery Trade.
- Anita, Mrs. Walton, Local Officer II, Department of Social Security.
- Geoffrey Colin Warde, Chairman, Marinex Industries Ltd; lately President, British Marine Industries Federation.
- Hugh Grenville Waterfield. For political service.
- Paul Waters, Higher Telecommunications on Employment of Disabled People, Technical Officer Grade I, Ministry of Defence.
- Denys James Watkins-Pitchford, Author and Illustrator.
- Robin Beaumont Watts, Chairman, County Fermanagh Ulster Savings Committee.
- Gertrude Margaret, Mrs. Whamond, Representative, Junior Infantry Battalion, Shorncliffe, Women's Royal Voluntary Service.
- Brian Lineham Wheatley, lately Chief Superintendent, Metropolitan Police.
- Sydney George Wheeler, Hercules Engineering Manager, Marshall of Cambridge (Engineering) Ltd.
- Grace Irene, Mrs. White. For services to the community in Okehampton, Devon.
- Harry Herbert Whiting. For services to the community in Lydd, Kent.
- Sylvia, Mrs. Whitrod, Co-ordinator for Adult Basic Education, Leeds Local Education Authority.
- Douglas Wigglesworth, lately Headteacher, St. John's Primary School, Weymouth, Dorset.
- Miss Lily Wilcox. For political service.
- Pamela Barbara, Mrs. Wildgoose, Secretary, Matlock Hospital League of Friends.
- Sidney James Wilks, Vice-Chairman, District and Ancillary Staff Committee, Electrical Electronic Telecommunications and Plumbing Union.
- Alfred Passmore Williams, Member, Cornwall Sea Fisheries Committee.
- Alfred Victor Spartan Williams, Higher Executive Officer, Advisory, Conciliation and Arbitration Service.
- Dennis Leonard Wiliams, lately Chief Superintendent, Sussex Police.
- William James Williamson, Chief Executive and Town Clerk, Ballymoney Borough Council.
- Muriel, Mrs. Wilson, Community Nurse Manager, Portsmouth.
- Ralph Wilson, Chairman, Northumberland Sea Fisheries Committee. For services to the fishing industry.
- Ronald Wilson, Town Clerk and Chief Executive, Carlisle City Council.
- Alfred William Woodhouse, Director, Sandwell Enterprise Ltd.
- David William Woodhouse. For services to Tourism in Wales.
- Derrick George Worthington, President, British Pyrotechnists Association.
- James Kenneth Wright. For services to Laser Technology.
- Wilfred Wright, Station Manager, Fawley Power Station, Central Electricity Generating Board.
- Alexander Keay Youngson, lately Assistant Technical Director, (Quantity Surveyor), Glenrothes Development Corporation.

=== Order of the Companions of Honour (CH) ===
- Professor Stephen William Hawking, C.B.E. For services to Astronomical Research.

== Cook Islands ==
=== Order of the British Empire ===
==== Officer of the Order of the British Empire (OBE) ====
Civil Division

- Apenera Pera Short JP. For services to the community.

==== Member of the Order of the British Empire (MBE) ====
Civil Division

- Tikaka Henry JP. For services to the community.

=== British Empire Medal (BEM) ===
Civil Division

- Taira Rere. For services to education and the community.
- Terua Mana Strickland. For services to education and the community.
