= Brian Ford =

Brian Ford may refer to:

- Brian Ford (numerical analyst), numerical analyst and founder of the Numerical Algorithms Group
- Brian Ford (cricketer) (born 1970), New Zealand cricketer
- Brian Ford (police officer), Ottawa Police Service police chief, 1993–2000
- Brian Ford (ice hockey) (born 1961), former NHL player
- Brian J. Ford (born 1939), scientist, broadcaster and author
- Brian Ford (British radio broadcaster), works for Scottish radio station 1152 Clyde 2
- Brian Ford (rugby union, born 1951), New Zealand rugby union player
- Brian Ford (rugby union, born 1939), Australian rugby union player
