= St Elizabeth of Portugal Church =

- St Elizabeth of Portugal Church, Richmond, London
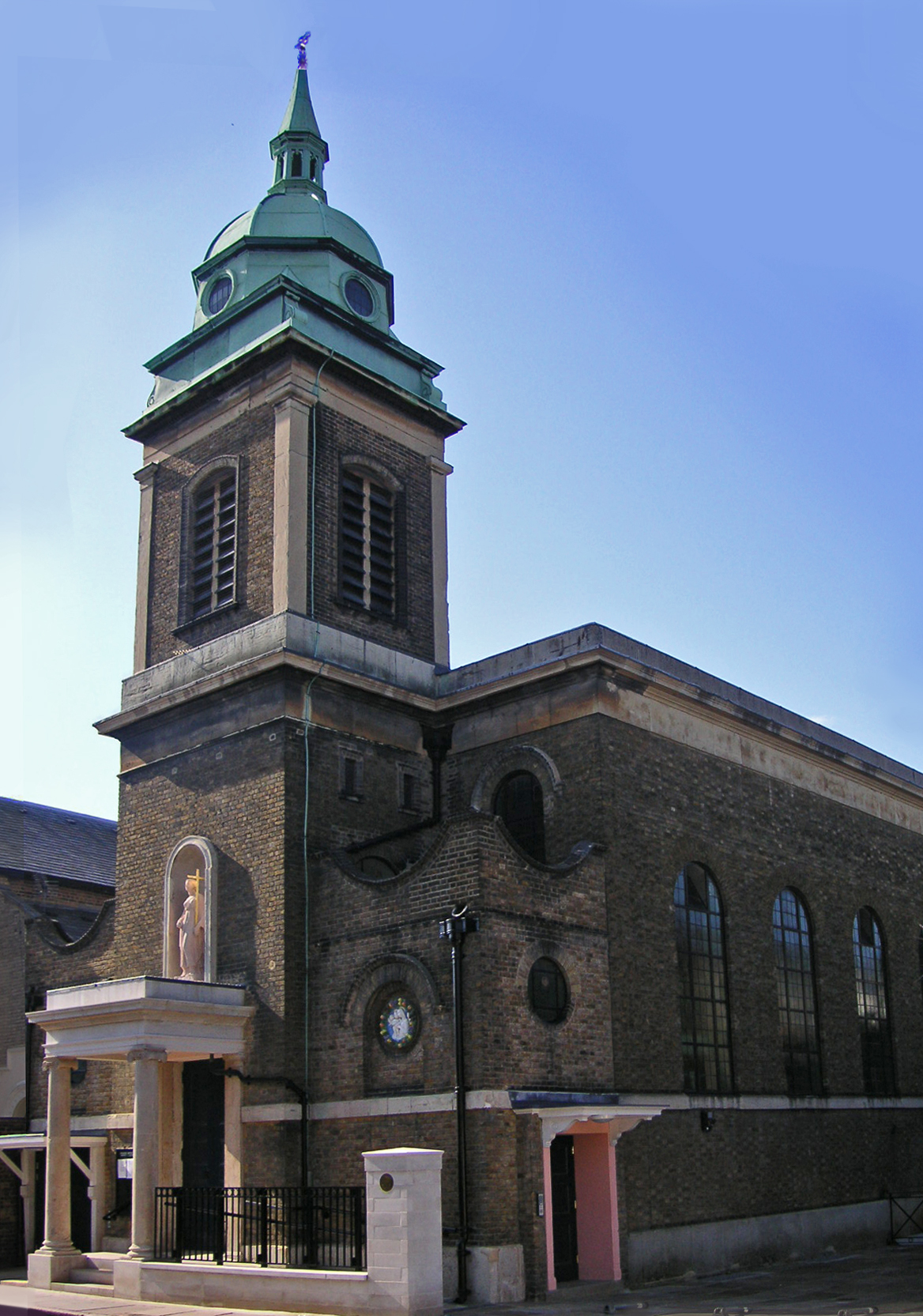
- St Elizabeth of Portugal Church
- 51.4576°N 0.3034°W
- OS grid reference: TQ 17967 74546
- Location: St Elizabeth of Portugal Church, The Vineyard, Richmond, London TW10 6AQ
- Country: England
- Denomination: Catholic Church
- Website: http://www.catholicrichmond.org

History
- Founded: c.1790
- Dedication: Elizabeth of Portugal
- Consecrated: circa. 1950's

Architecture
- Architect: Thomas Hardwick
- Years built: 1824–1903

Specifications
- Materials: yellow and red brick

Administration
- Province: Southwark
- Diocese: Archdiocese of Southwark
- Deanery: Mortlake
- Parish: Richmond

Clergy
- Priest: Father Stephen Langridge

Listed Building – Grade II
- Official name: Church of St Elizabeth of Portugal
- Designated: 24 December 1968
- Reference no.: 1261982

St Elizabeth of Portugal Church is a Grade II listed Roman Catholic parish church in The Vineyard, Richmond in the London Borough of Richmond upon Thames, south west London. It is adjacent to The Vineyard Life Church. Dedicated to a 14th-century queen consort of Portugal, it claims to be oldest standing Catholic Church in the Archdiocese of Southwark.

== History ==
The church dates from the 1790s. The present building in yellow and red brick, which is Grade II listed and dates from 1824, was the gift of Elizabeth Doughty. It was designed by Thomas Hardwick. A gallery was added in 1851. The chancel, presbytery and tower were rebuilt in 1903 according to plans drawn up by the architect Frederick Walters. The representations of the Stations of the Cross around the nave were designed by Don Pavey in the 1950s and painted by Jo Ledger.

Famous worshippers at the church include ex-King Manoel II of Portugal in the early 20th century.

== Events ==
=== Music ===
In the late 1960s and early 1970s, the crypt of the church was used as a gig venue and hosted artists such as John Martyn, Ralph McTell, and Elvis Costello.

=== Marriages ===
- Phil Lynott, rock musician, married Caroline Crowther, daughter of British comedian Leslie Crowther, on 14 February 1980
- Barbara Dickson, singer-songwriter and actress, married Oliver Cookson, TV producer, in August 1984

=== Funerals ===
- Phil Lynott, rock musician (1949–1986), on 9 January 1986

== Current activities ==
As of October 2026, the parish priest is Francis Murphy. Mass is held daily. Other activities are listed in the church's weekly newsletter.

== Gallery ==
Exterior of the church

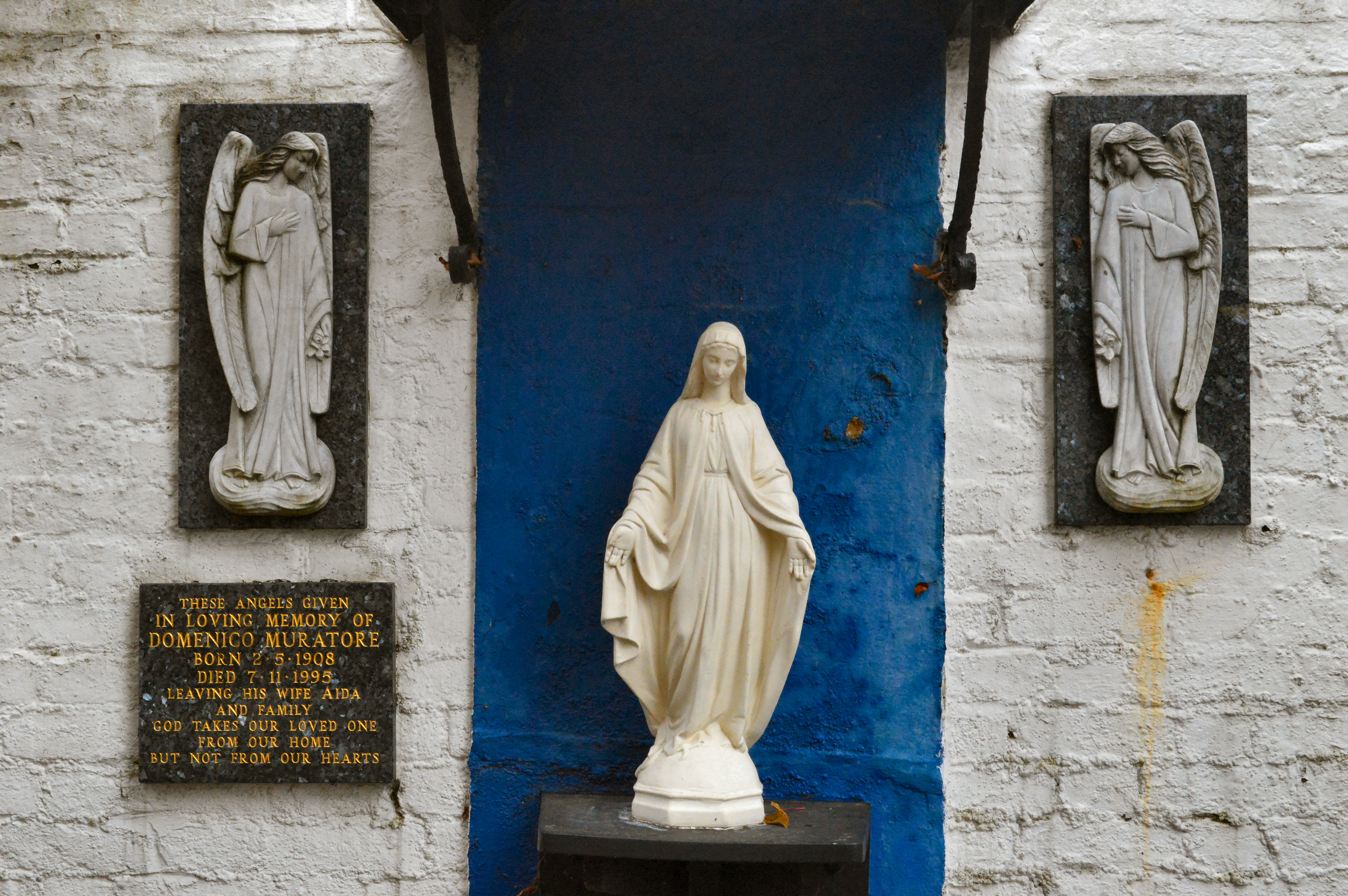

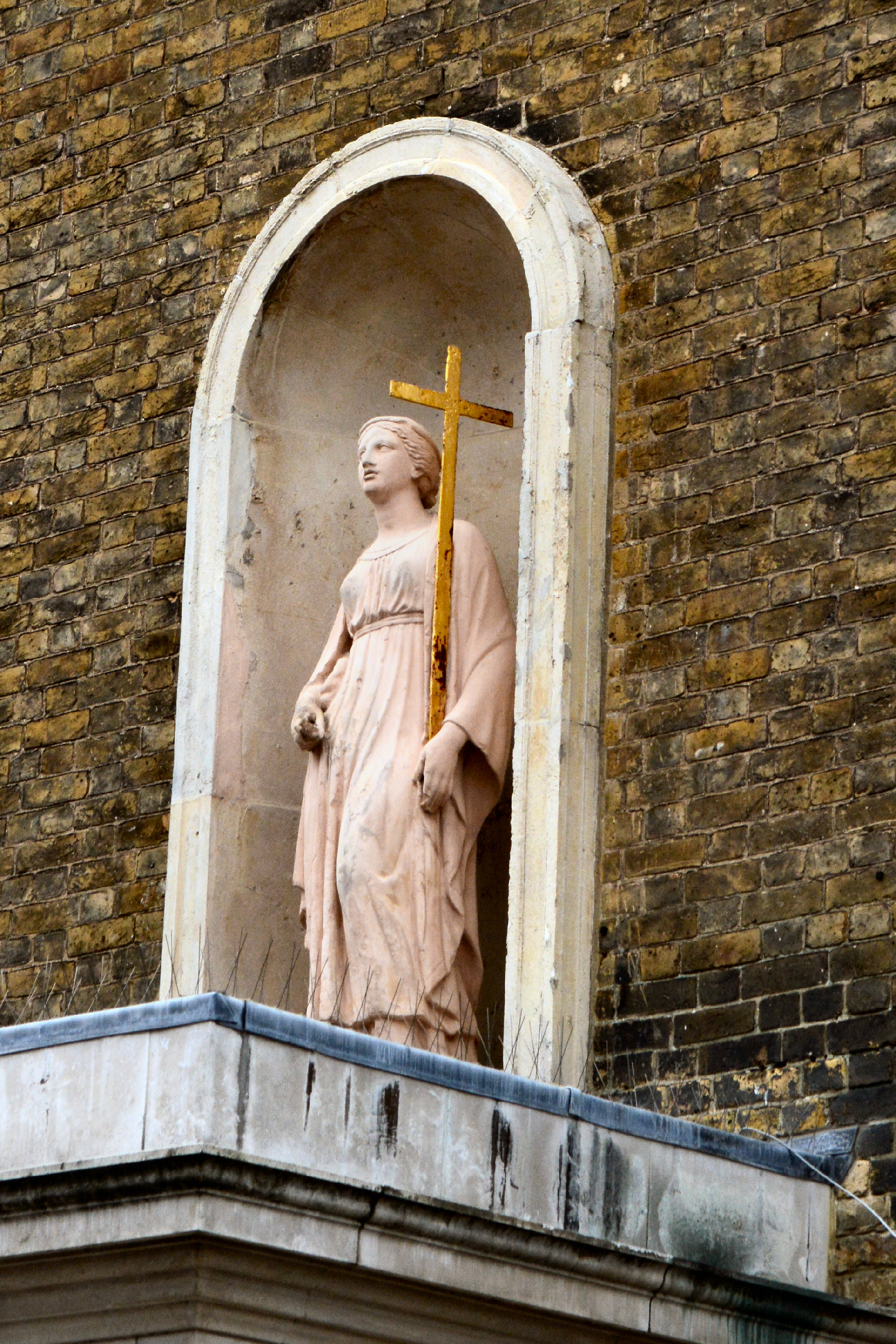
Interior of the church

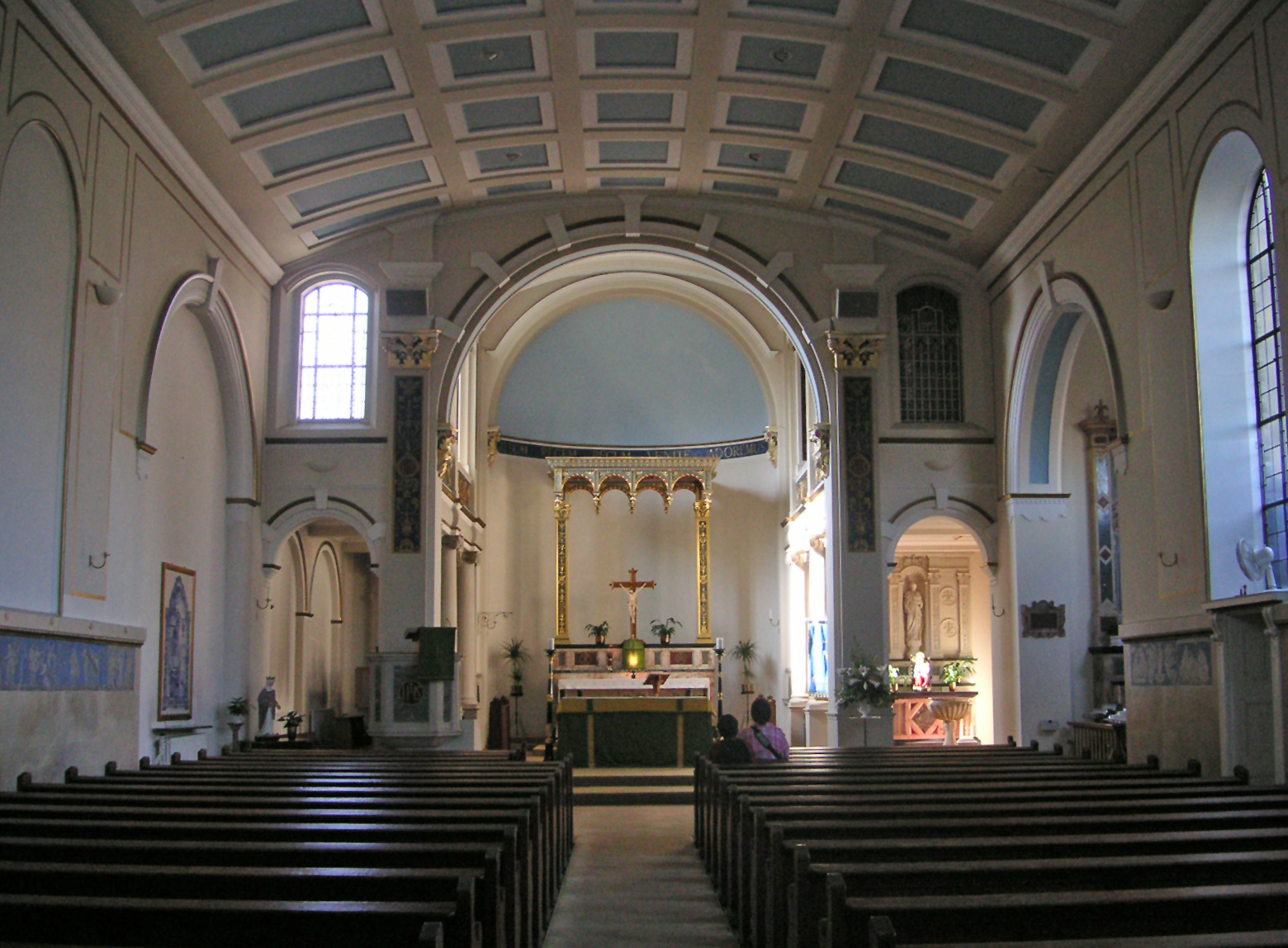

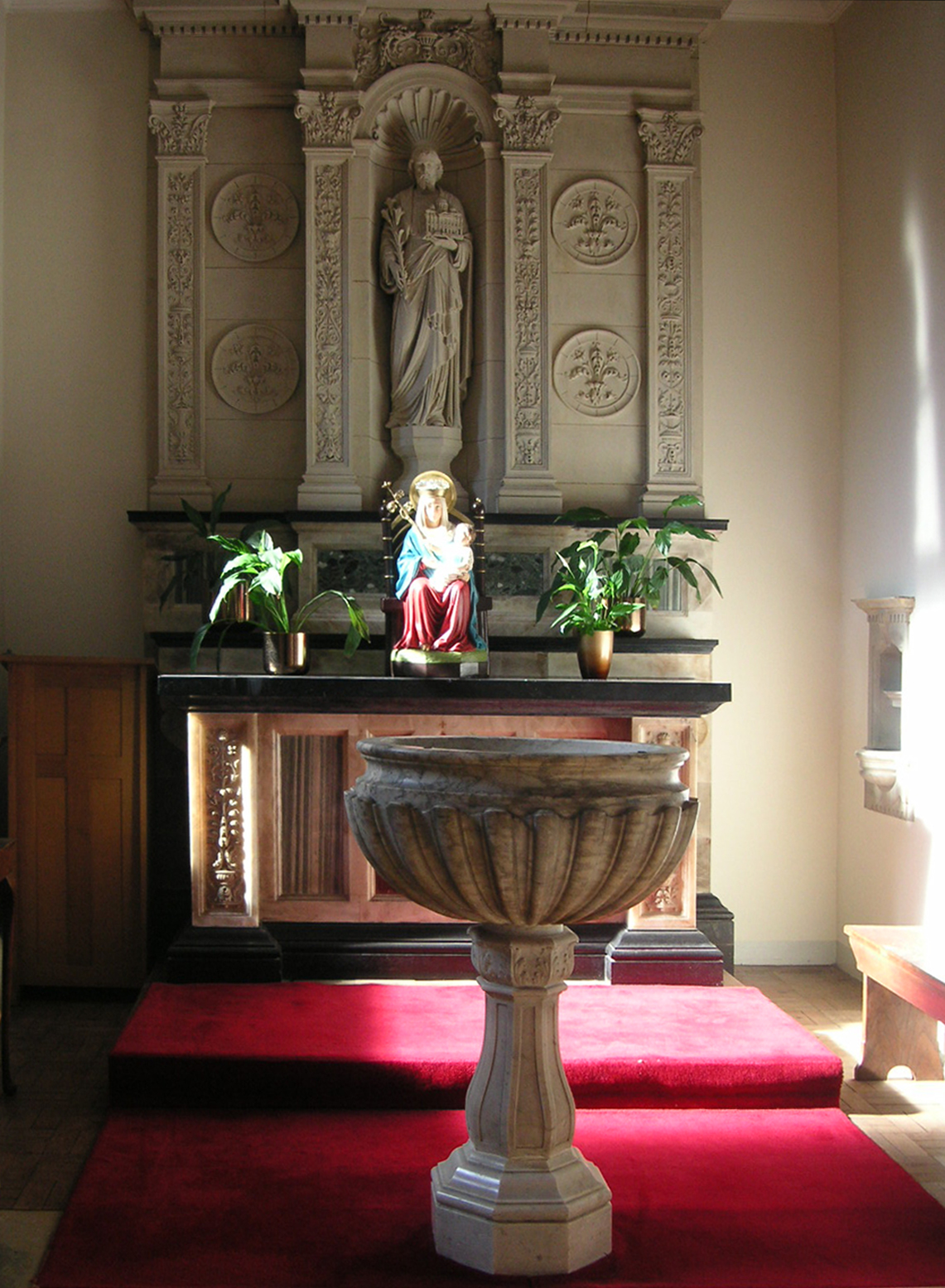

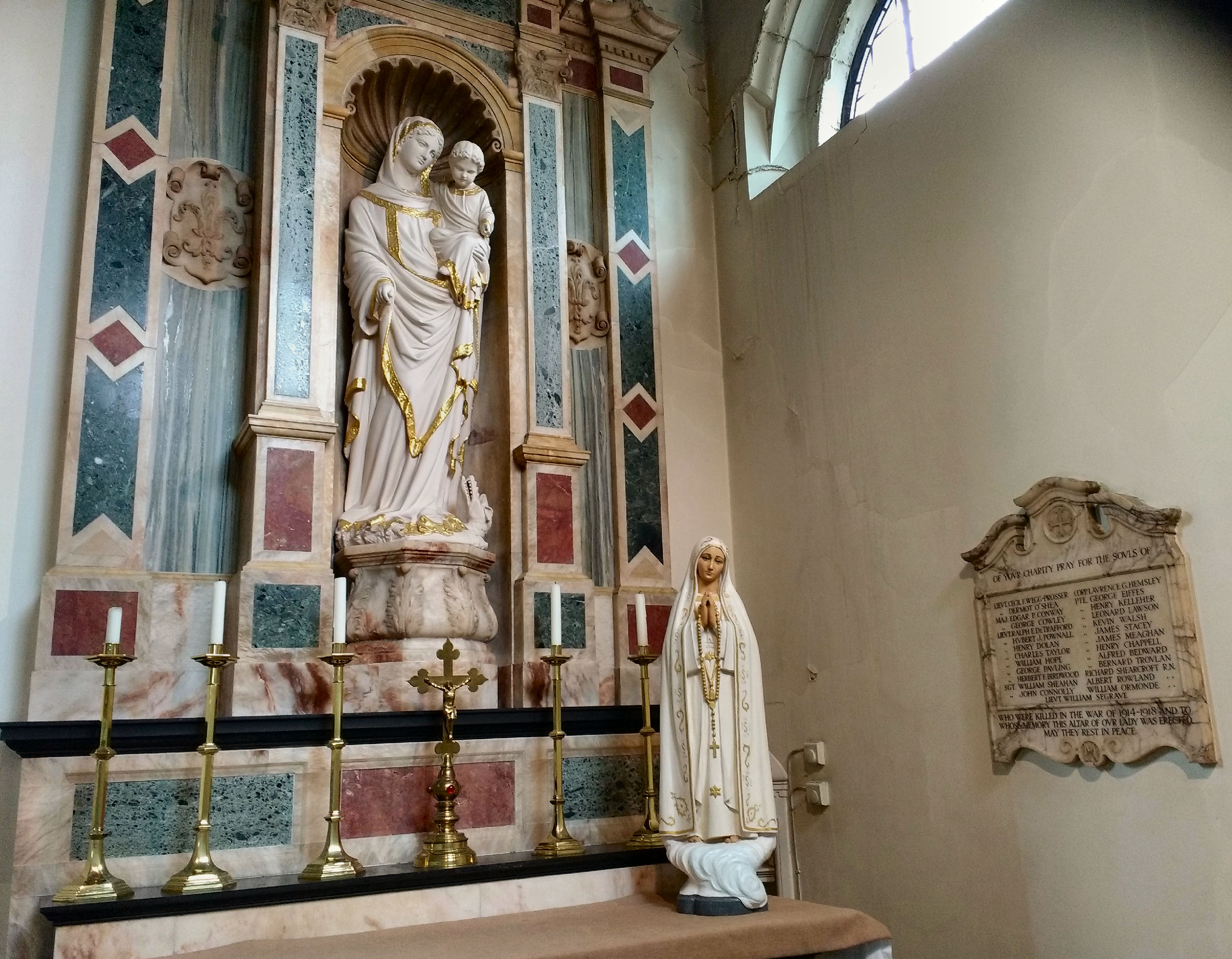
Lady chapel and war memorial

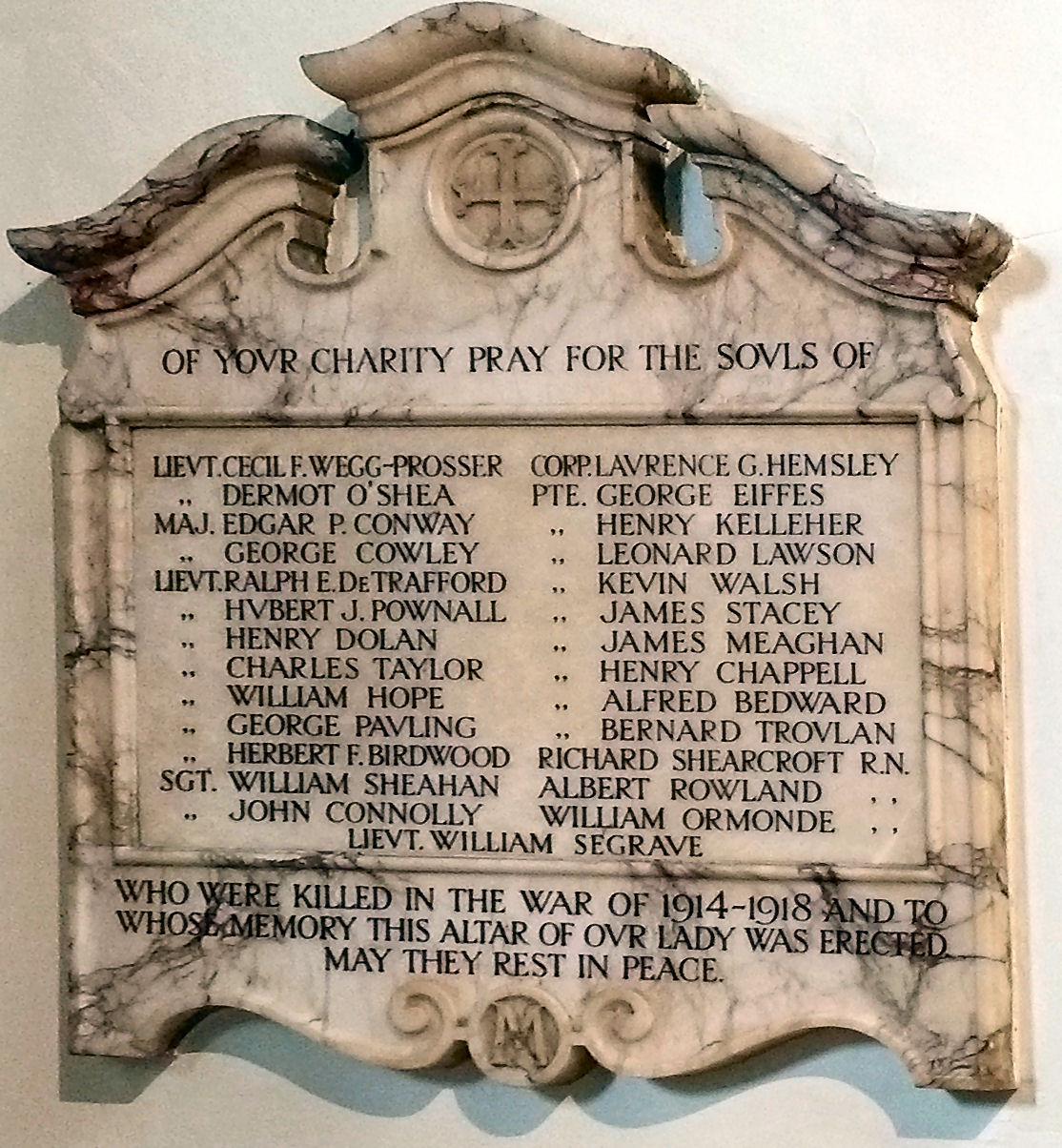
War memorial

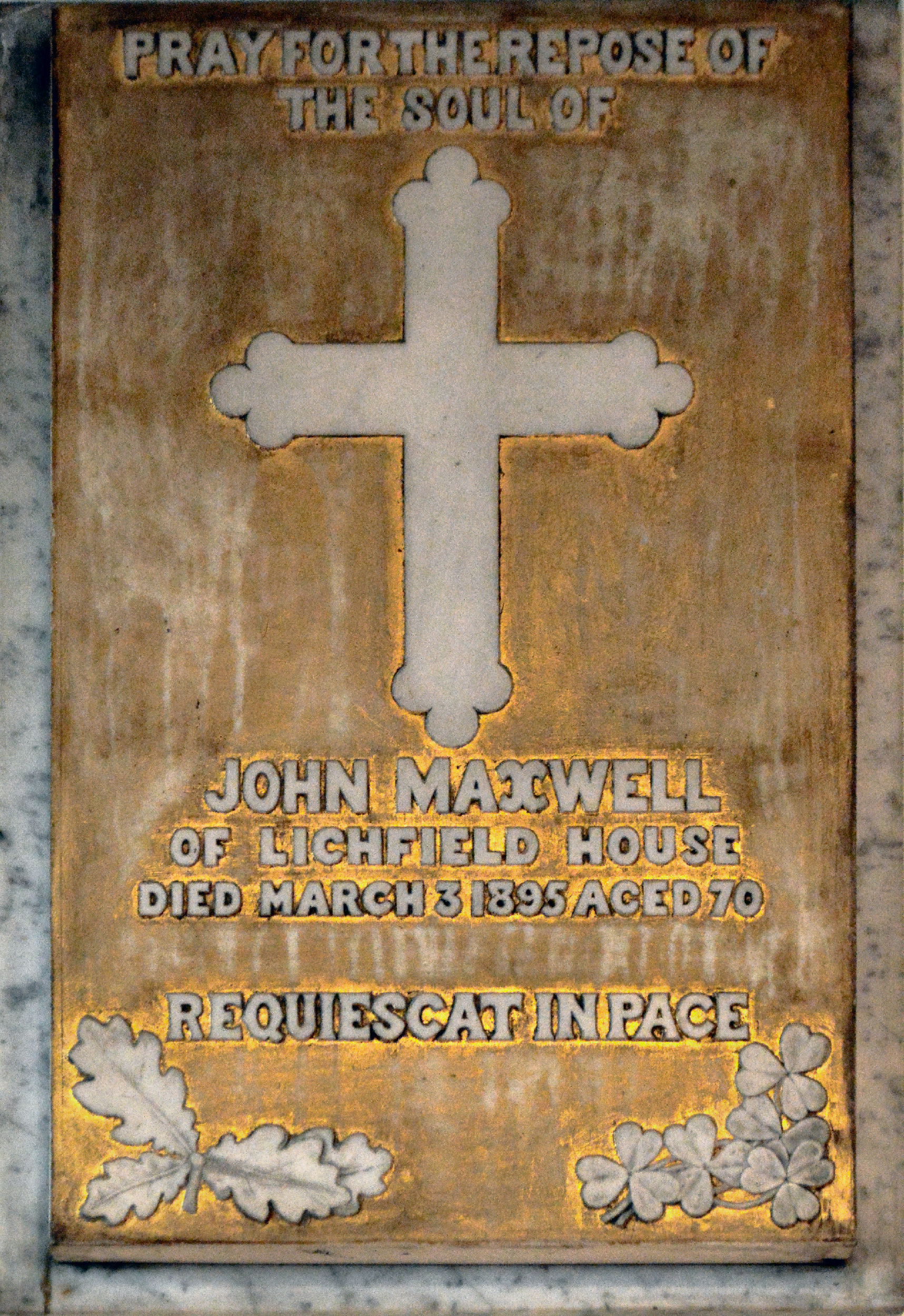
Memorial to John Maxwell (1824–1895) of Lichfield House
