= Godfrey Fowler =

British academic, general practitioner, and medical scientist (1931–2022)

Godfrey Heath Fowler (1931 – 29 March 2022) was a British academic, general practitioner, and medical scientist. He was Clinical Reader in General Practice in the University of Oxford from 1978 until 1996, when he was awarded the title of Professor of General Practice, as a recognition of distinction.

== Early life and education ==
Fowler was born in 1931, in Wolverley, Worcestershire, to Dorothy (née Bealey) and the businessman Donald Fowler. He was educated at Sebright School. He attended University College, Oxford (1950–1954), and was then at University College Hospital in London until 1956, when he graduated with his medical degree (BM BCh). He completed the Diploma of the Royal College of Obstetricians and Gynaecologists (DObst RCOG) in 1958 and the Diploma in Child Health (DCH) the next year.

== Career ==
Fowler entered general practice in 1959 and worked in Oxford from 1961. He was the college doctor to Balliol College (1974–1991) and to Queen's College, and promoted the foundation of counselling services for students. In 1972, he was appointed a World Health Organization Fellow and in 1978 became a professorial fellow at Balliol and a clinical reader in general practice at the University of Oxford. He was awarded the title of Professor of General Practice in 1996, and retired the following year, retaining an emeritus fellowship at Balliol.

His research was in the field of preventive medicine, including interventions to promote smoking cessation and healthy dietary habits. He studied whether a person's risk of developing cancer or cardiovascular disease could be reduced by advice or health checks from their GP. He also studied changes in primary care, including how care for chronic diseases is delivered.

He was appointed an Officer of the Order of the British Empire in the 1989 Birthday Honours. He was a fellow of the Royal College of Physicians (elected in 1996), the Royal College of General Practitioners (elected in 1978) and the Faculty of Public Health.

== Personal life ==
In 1961, Fowler married Sissel Vidnes; they had two sons, one of whom died in 1995.

Fowler died on 29 March 2022, aged 90.

== Publications ==
- (Editor, jointly with Muir Gray) Preventive Medicine in General Practice (Oxford University Press, 1982).
- (Editor, jointly with Muir Gray) Essentials of Preventive Medicine (Blackwell Scientific, 1984).
