= John Matthews (Scottish cricketer) =

Scottish cricketer and physician

Personal information
- Full name: John Duncan Matthews
- Born: 19 September 1921; Rainhill, Lancashire, England
- Died: 22 January 2009 (aged 87); Edinburgh, Midlothian, Scotland
- Batting: Left-handed

Domestic team information
- Years: Team
- 1951–1955: Scotland

Career statistics
Competition	First-class
Matches	5
Runs scored	81
Batting average	11.57
100s/50s	–/–
Top score	25
Catches/stumpings	–/–
- Source: Cricinfo, 22 June 2022

John Duncan Matthews CVO (19 September 1921 — 22 January 2009) was an English-born Scottish first-class cricketer and physician.

Matthews was born in September 1921 at Rainhill, Lancashire. He was educated at Shrewsbury School, before matriculating to Magdalene College, Cambridge to study medicine. His time at Cambridge coincided with the Second World War, and while Matthews played cricket for Cambridge University Cricket Club, their matches did not carry first-class status. From Cambridge he transferred to the University of Edinburgh to undertake his clinical studies, graduating with his MB ChB in 1945. Shortly after his graduation, he joined the Royal Army Medical Corps (RAMC) as a lieutenant in May 1946. He was attached to the King's Hussars in British-occupied Germany. He was later invited to join the staff of Professor Sir Derrick Dunlop at the Royal Infirmary of Edinburgh, where he also worked alongside Professor Sir Stanley Davidson and Dr. Andrew Rae Gilchrist.

In Edinburgh he joined the Grange Cricket Club and was selected to play for Scotland on their tour of England in 1951, making his debut in first-class cricket against Warwickshire at Edgbaston, before making a second first-class appearance in the same season against a touring Northamptonshire team at Edinburgh. Two further appearances followed in 1953, against Northamptonshire and Yorkshire, with a final appearance following against Worcestershire in 1955. In his five first-class matches for Scotland, Matthews scored 81 runs at an average of 11.57, with a highest score of 29.

Returning to civilian medicine, Matthews was appointed a consultant at the Royal Infirmary of Edinburgh, where he spent seven years in charge of the outpatient department, from which he proceeded to become a senior ward consultant. He also held the chairmanship of the physicians committee at the infirmary, a position he held for seven years. All the while, he retained his commission in the RAMC, being promoted to captain in June 1954, antedated to January 1953. He was granted the honorary rank of lieutenant colonel in December 1957, while part of the Territorial Army, before being granted the acting rank of colonel in August 1959. In March 1960, he was promoted to major, followed by promotion to the full rank of lieutenant colonel in September of the same year. In March 1961, he was promoted to the full rank of colonel. In 1958, he was elected a fellow of the Royal College of Physicians and served as a member of its council between 1983 and 1985, and was vice-president of the college from 1985 to 1987. In 1950 he was elected a member of the Harveian Society of Edinburgh and in 1969 he was elected a member of the Aesculapian Club. Matthews served the Royal Household, for which he was appointed to the Royal Victorian Order in the 1989 Birthday Honours. Matthews died at Edinburgh in January 2009; he was survived by his wife and their two sons.
