= Michael Drury (physician) =

British physician (1926–2014)

Sir Victor William Michael Drury OBE (5 August 1926 – 11 June 2014) was a British medical doctor who was professor of General Practice at the University of Birmingham, and in 1985 was elected president of the Royal College of General Practitioners.
