= Peter Wyldbore Gibbs =

Peter Wyldbore Gibbs KCVO
- Born: 1 January 1934; London
- Died: 2001
- Education: Eton College; Royal Military Academy, Sandhurst
- Military career
- Allegiance: United Kingdom
- Branch: British Army
- Rank: Lieutenant colonel
- Commands: Coldstream Guards

Lieutenant-Colonel Sir Peter Wyldebore Gibbs KCVO (1 January 1934, London – 2001) was Private Secretary to Anne, Princess Royal, from 1982 to 1997.

Educated at the Royal Military Academy, Sandhurst, Gibbs was commissioned into the Coldstream Guards on 25 July 1953, and promoted to Lieutenant-Colonel in 1974. He became Assistant Adjutant-General London District in 1977, and his last posting was as a staff officer (GSOI) in the Ministry of Defence. He retired from the British Army in 1982 and joined the Office of the Princess Royal. Colonel Gibbs was appointed LVO in 1989 and promoted to CVO, 1995, and KCVO, 1997.

The Household of the Princess Royal provides the administrative support to the only daughter of Queen Elizabeth II. It was based at Buckingham Palace, and is headed by the Private Secretary.
