= Terence Streeton =

British diplomat

Sir Terence George Streeton KBE CMG (12 January 1930 – 5 September 2017) was a British diplomat and the former high commissioner to Bangladesh.

He was appointed a Companion of the Order of St Michael and St George in the 1981 Birthday Honours.
