= Mary Tuck =

British social scientist and civil servant (1928–1996)

Mary Tuck, CBE (née McDermott: 5 May 1928 – 20 October 1996) was a British criminologist, psychologist and civil servant. She was appointed a CBE in 1989.

== Early life ==
Mary McDermott was born on 5 May 1928 in St. Helens, Lancashire. Hers was a devout Roman Catholic family and she attended the Convent School of Notre Dame, where her aunt was the headmistress and her mother a maths teacher. Mary studied at the University of Liverpool for a year and through an open scholarship at St Anne's College, Oxford (1946–49). Here she received a Fulbright scholarship and went on to study at the University of Pittsburgh. Apart from her studies there, she also taught Freshman composition.

== Career ==
McDermott was first appointed to the Government Communications Headquarters but in 1952 she became an assistant editor of Vogue. Later, she worked as a copywriter and marketing consultant independently and for organisations, including J. Walter Thompson. She received her second degree in social psychology from the London School of Economics and was influenced by the ideas of American psychologist Martin Fishbein.

In 1975, she was recruited as a direct entry principal for the Broadcasting Department at the Home Office. The next year, she was transferred to the Research and Planning Unit and was made its chief in 1985, a post she held till her retirement in 1989. She worked to improve the unit's role in research and policy-making. She was made CBE in 1989.

Tuck continued her prison-related work after retirement and was a member of Lord Woolf's inquiry to investigate the 1990 Strangeways Prison riot. She was a visiting professor at Cranfield School of Management.

She was an advocate of non-custodial penalties and suggested that instead of being sentenced to prison, young offenders should be re-educated. She was critical of the Police and Magistrates' Courts Bill, 1994 and pointed out, in an article for The Guardian, that it reduced the control of local authorities and if it passed then "standards of policing in this country will suffer very badly".

== Personal life ==
Mary McDermott married Robin Tuck in 1955. Together they had two sons and two daughters.

== Death and legacy ==
Tuck died on 20 October 1996, from heart failure. Gary L. McDowell and Jinney Smith dedicated their book Juvenile Delinquency in the United States and the United Kingdom (1999) to Tuck.

== Works ==
- Tuck, Mary (1976). How do we choose?: a study in consumer behaviour. F6. Methuen. ISBN 978-0-416-82000-3.
- Tuck, Mary; Southgate, Peter (1981). Ethnic minorities, crime and policing: a survey of the experiences of West Indians and whites. Her Majesty's Stationery Office. ISBN 978-0-11-340765-1.
- Tuck, Mary (1989). Drinking and disorder: a study of non-metropolitan violence. Her Majesty's Stationery Office. ISBN 978-0-11-340926-6.
- Tuck, Mary (1994). "Evidence, Ideas and Policy: Research and Public Policy". In Coote, Anna (ed.). Families, Children and Crime. Institute for Public Policy Research. pp. 65–71. ISBN 978-1-872452-91-3.
