= Jo Ledger =

Jo Ledger OBE (9 June 1926 – 27 June 2010) was an artist who was Art Director for Royal Doulton.

Joseph William Ledger was born in Beverley in 1926 and went on to study at the Royal College of Art, where he was awarded the Medal of Distinction, and Beaux Arts in Paris.

He taught art and design at Brighton and Kingston.

He received commissions for religious murals and stained glass before joining Royal Doulton at Burslem in 1954 as Art Director, where he remained until he retired in 1989. His contributions included innovative Royal Doulton Tableware, a range of ceramic Royal Crown Derby paperweights and figurines designed by Royal Academicians. He was appointed OBE for services to the British ceramic industry in the 1989 Birthday Honours.
