= Reginald Hall (endocrinologist) =

English endocrinologist

Reginald Hall CBE (1 October 1931 – 20 July 1994) was a British endocrinologist known for his expertise in thyroid disease.

== Biography ==
Hall was born in 1931 in Belmont, County Durham, to Reginald Peacock Hall, a postmaster, and Maggie Watson Wilson. He attended Alderman Wraith Grammar School, Berwick upon Tweed Grammar School, and King's College at the University of Durham. He graduated from Durham with a BSc in physiology in 1953, followed by an MBBS in 1956 and MD in 1963. He married Joan Scott Patterson, a teacher, in 1955, and they had a daughter in 1958. Joan died shortly afterwards, and Hall remarried to Molly Hill, a medical doctor, in 1960; they had four children together.

Hall spent the majority of his medical career at the Royal Victoria Infirmary in Newcastle. He had developed an interest in the thyroid gland as an undergraduate student, and he received a year-long Harkness Fellowship in 1960 to work with John B. Stanbury at his thyroid clinic at Massachusetts General Hospital. In 1967 Hall was appointed a consultant physician to the Royal Victoria Infirmary and a senior lecturer with the University of Newcastle upon Tyne. He was promoted to a professor of medicine in 1970. His research involved assays for measuring thyroid-stimulating hormone (TSH), regulation of TSH secretion, and the causes of autoimmune thyroid disease (particularly Graves' disease).

In 1980, Hall left Newcastle for Cardiff, where he was made the head of department and a professor of medicine at the University of Wales College of Medicine. Soon after his move to Cardiff, he was diagnosed with primary amyloidosis, and underwent a heart transplant in 1984, performed by Magdi Yacoub. Despite his illness, he continued a productive research career, overseeing studies of thyroid disease in pregnancy, production of thyroid autoantibodies, and TSH receptors. He retired in 1989.

Hall was appointed Commander of the Order of the British Empire (CBE) in 1989 for services to medicine, and later received an honorary MD from the University of Wales. He served as president of the Royal Society of Medicine's endocrine section and was an active member of the European Thyroid Association. He died in 1994 from complications of amyloidosis at the University Hospital of Wales.
