= E. F. D. Roberts =

British librarian and palaeolontologist

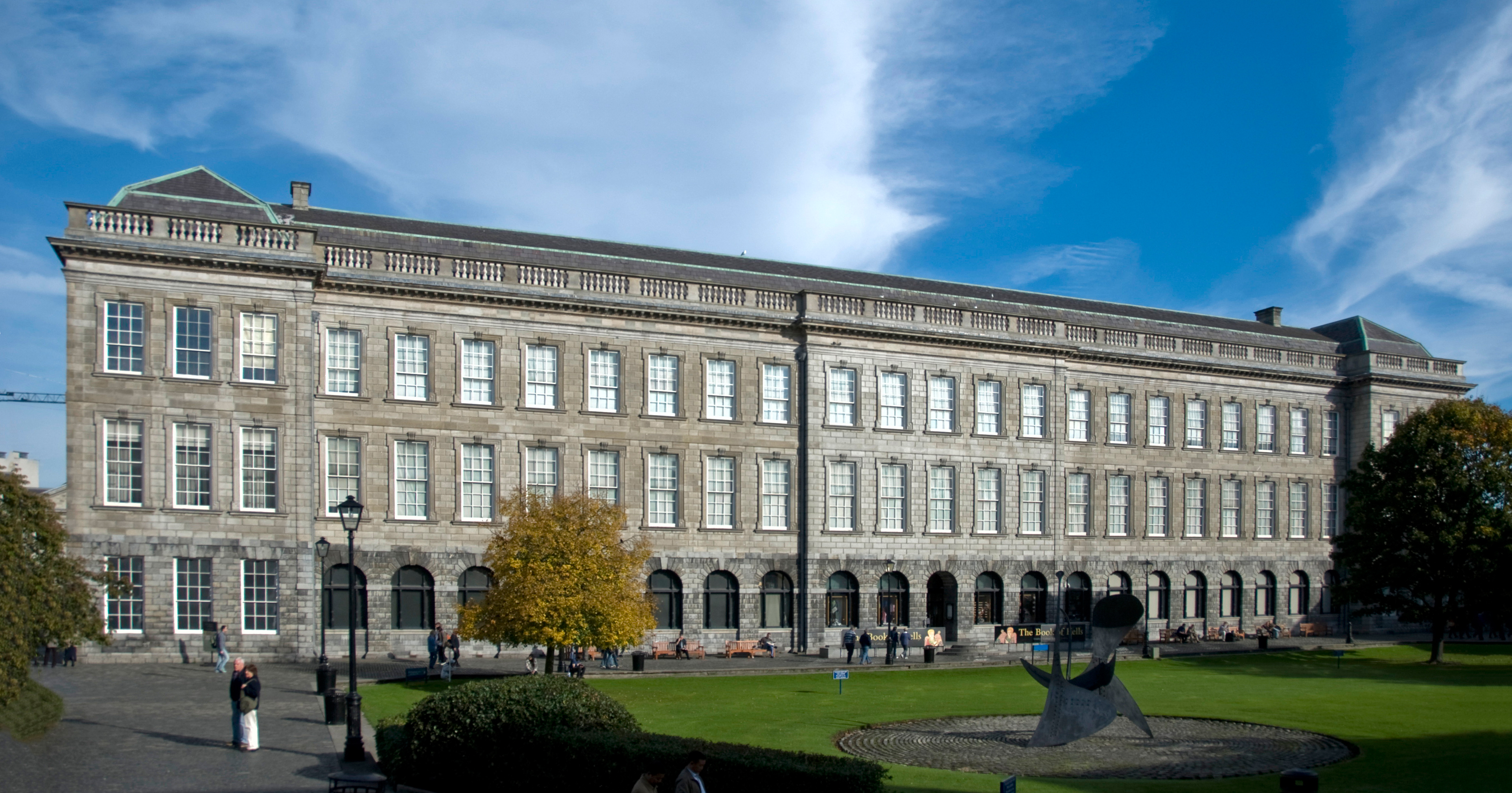
Trinity College Library, Dublin

Prof Edward Frederick Denis Roberts FRSE (1927–1990) was a 20th-century British librarian and palaeolontologist. He was Librarian of the National Library of Scotland. As an author he was known as E. F. D. Roberts.

== Life ==
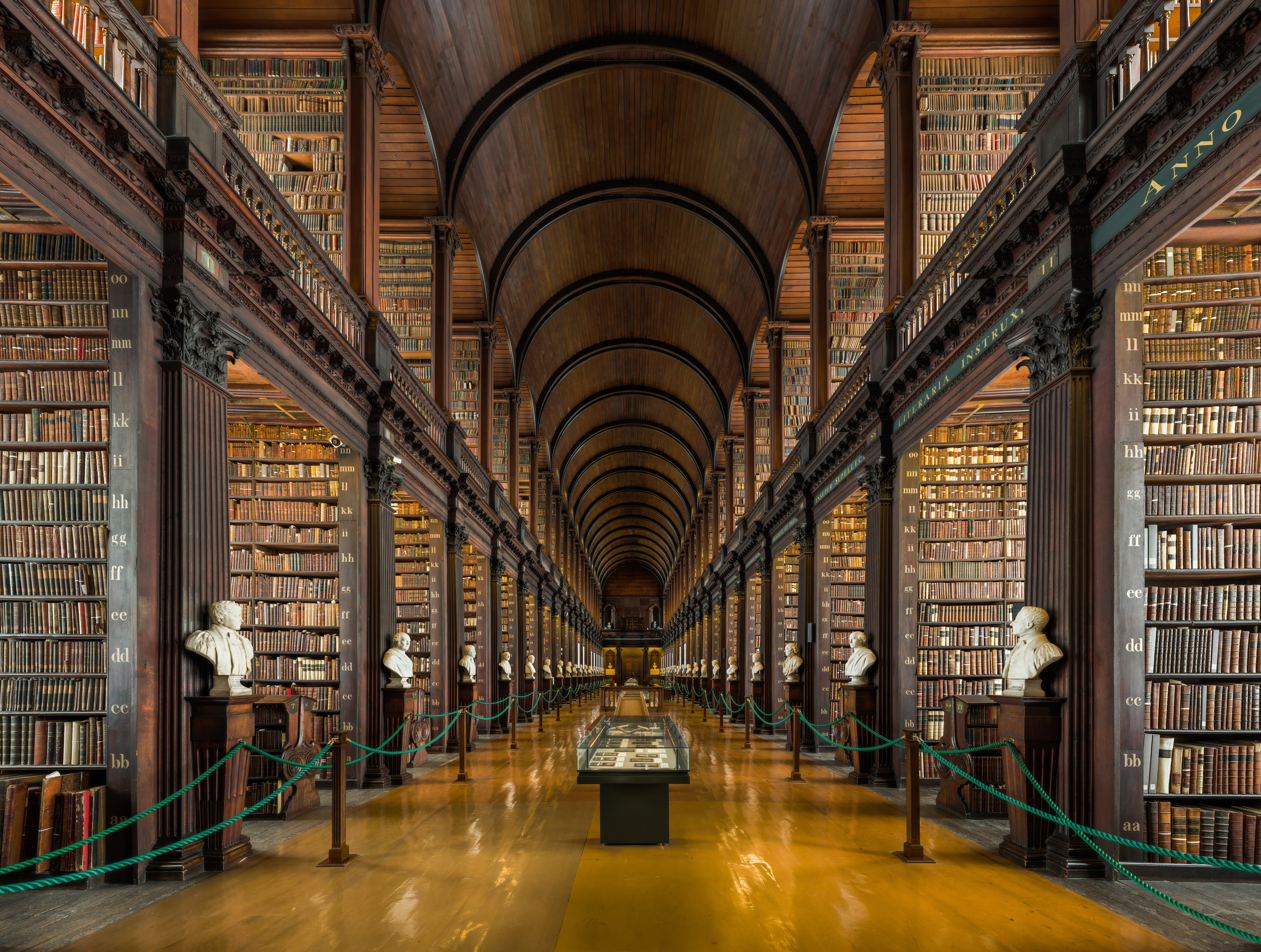
The interior of Trinity College Library in Dublin, Ireland

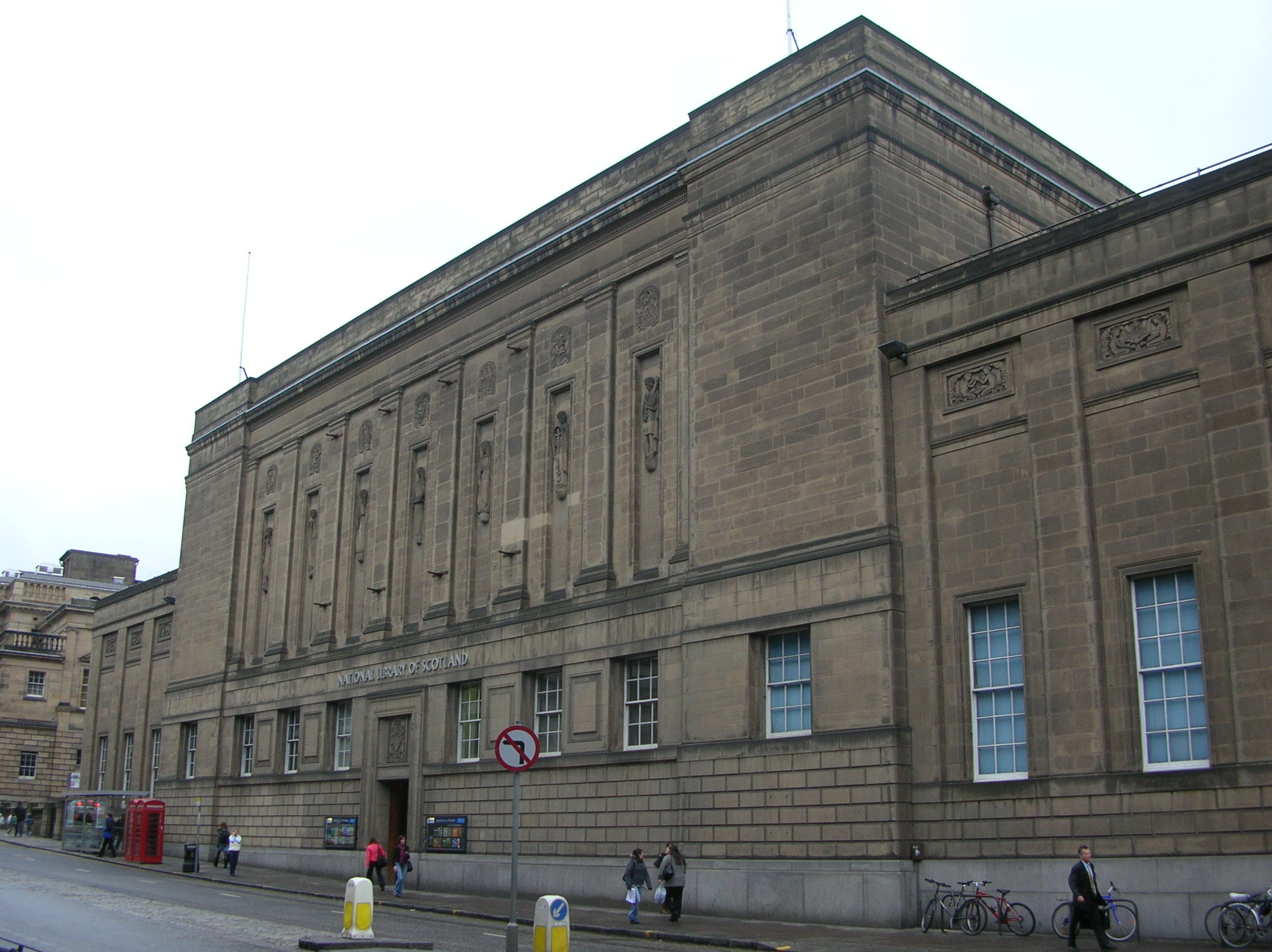
National Library of Scotland

Denis Roberts was born in Belfast on 16 June 1927. He was educated at the Royal Belfast Academical Institution. He then went to Queen's University, Belfast graduating BA in 1951 then going on to gain a doctorate (PhD). He then went to Edinburgh University gaining a Diploma in Palaeontology. In 1955 he became Assistant Keeper at the National Library of Scotland in Edinburgh. In 1966 he became Secretary, then in 1967 obtained the prestigious position as Librarian of Trinity College Library at Trinity College, Dublin. In 1970 he returned to Edinburgh as Librarian of the National Library.

In 1980 he was elected a Fellow of the Royal Society of Edinburgh. His proposers were Anthony Elliot Ritchie, John Cameron, Lord Cameron, Neil Campbell, and John McInytre.

He died in Edinburgh on 14 February 1990, aged 62.

== Family ==
In 1954 he married Irene Richardson.

== Publications ==
- The Register of John Mey, Archbishop of Armagh 1443-1456 (1972)
- Thomas Graham Brown 1882-1965 (1982)
- The Eye of the Mind: The Scot and his Books (1983)
