= Brian Ford (numerical analyst) =

British mathematician

Brian Ford (OBE, born 1940, Nottingham) is a British Mathematician who founded, and until his retirement in 2004, was director of the Numerical Algorithms Group (NAG). Ford gained a Ph.D. in Applied Mathematics from the University of Nottingham. The NAG (then Nottingham Algorithms Group) project began in 1970 as a collaborative venture, led by Ford, between the Universities of Birmingham, Leeds, Manchester, Nottingham and Oxford, and the Atlas Computer Laboratory. In 1973 the project moved to Oxford and was renamed. Ford was appointed a Officer of the Order of the British Empire in 1989 in "recognition of outstanding services to British industry and research" In 2005 he was awarded an Honorary Degree from the University of Bath.
